= Paragraph 183 =

Provision of the German Criminal Code regarding public indecency and cross-dressing

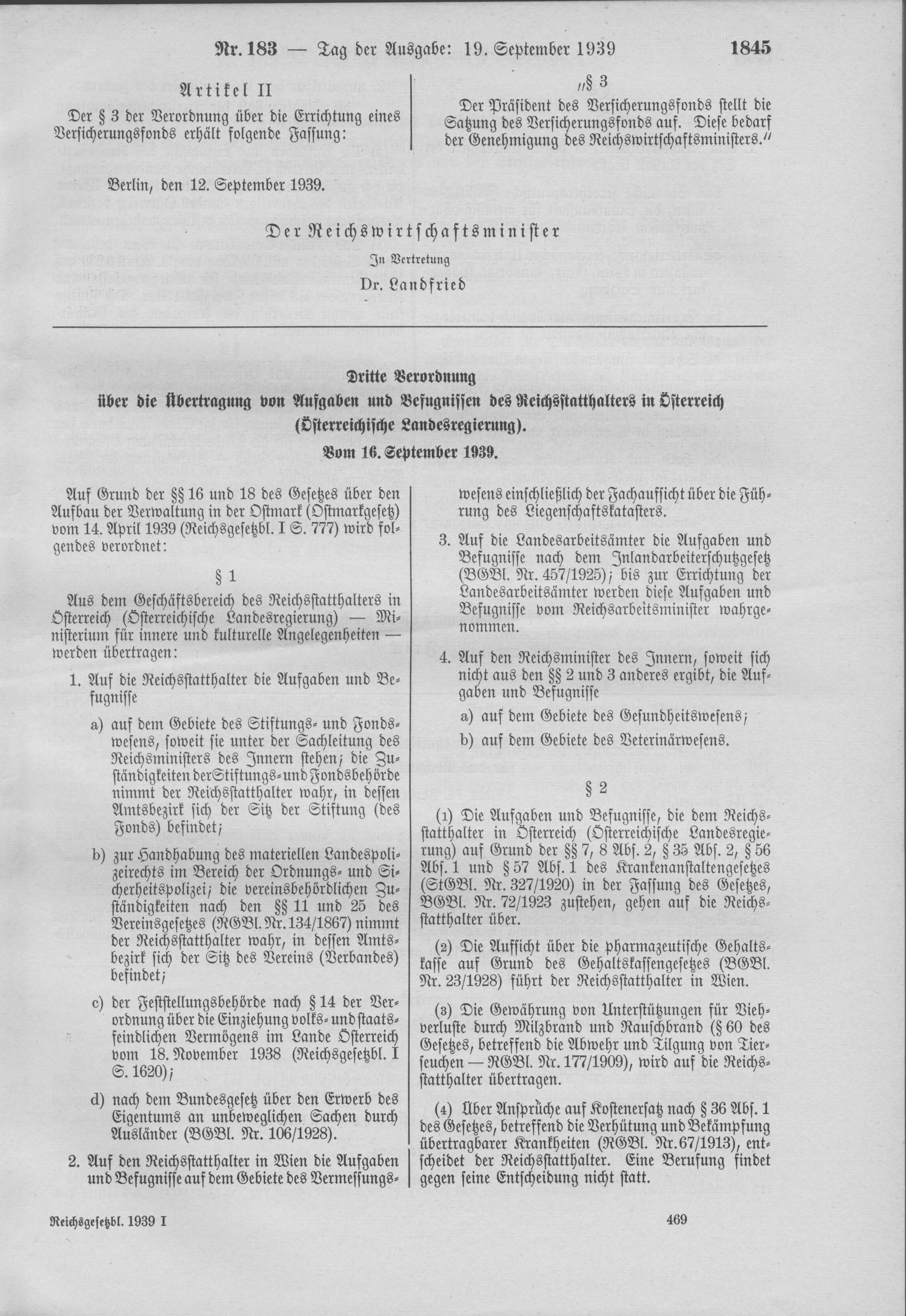
1939 Nazi Imperial Law publication of Section 183

Paragraph 183 (known formally as §183 StGB; also known as Section 183 in English) is a public indecency law of the German Criminal Code, which prohibits "sexual self-determination" and public exhibitionism. From its adoption in 1871, at an increasing rate during the rise of the Nazis, and until as late as the mid-20th century, the law was used to enforce penalties (including imprisonment, and, at times, loss of civil rights) for cross-dressing and homosexual acts. As of 2021, the law's scope is limited to indecent exposure.

== Historical overview ==
Paragraph 183 was first adopted in 1871. At the time of the law's adoption, it referred to penalties for "anyone who publicly causes a nuisance by a lewd act" with imprisonment of "up to two years." In the earliest versions of the law, the loss of civil rights was also a consequence of breaking the law.

The statute drew legal influence from previous measures, including those undertaken by the Holy Roman Empire and Prussian states. The Nazis expanded enforcement of the law in the 1930s as part of the most severe persecution of homosexual men in history.

Historians Laurie Marhoefer of the University of Washington and W. Jake Newsome have argued that transgender people were a target of Nazi persecution through enforcement of the law, citing instances of charges against cross-dressing.

According to Marheofer, one notable instance of Paragraph 183 enforcement during the 1940s involved a self-identified transvestite, who was later murdered in Buchenwald concentration camp after a series of Paragraph 183 and Paragraph 175 convictions.

=== Enforcement and revisions ===
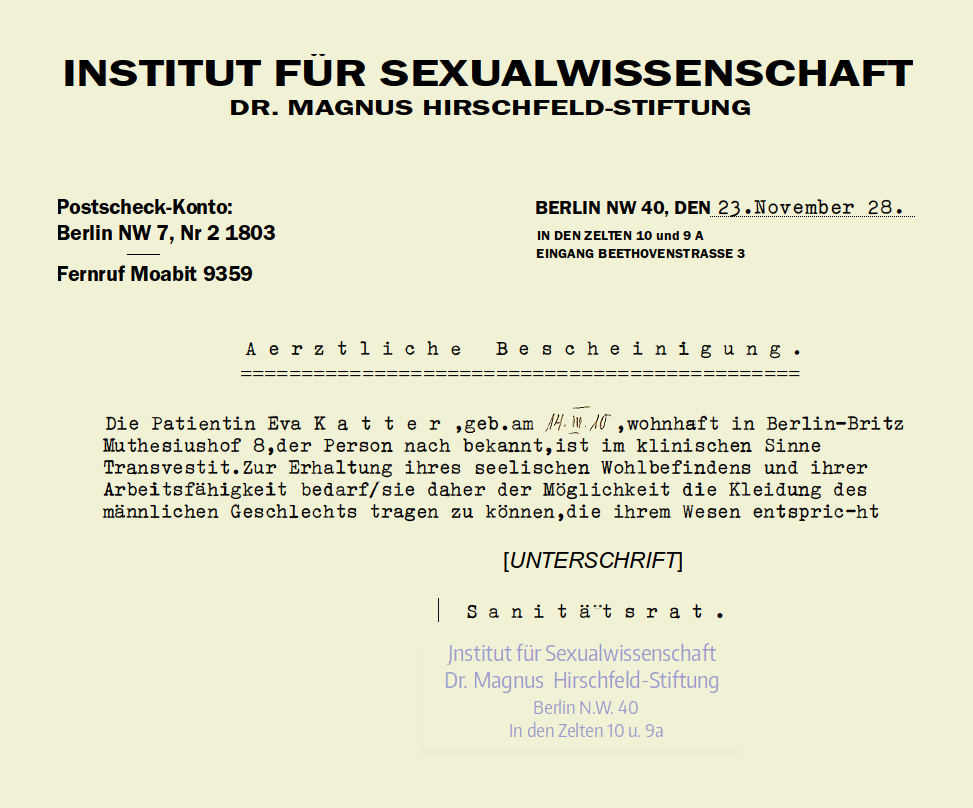
Transvestite certificate issued in 1928 to prevent arrest under Paragraph 183

Historically, the enforcement of Paragraph 183 has varied from locality to locality. In the more tolerant and progressive locality of Berlin, between 1919 and 1933, Magnus Hirschfeld's Institute for Sexual Science issued transvestite certificates in partnership with the Berlin Police Department, which served as a form of identification that could protect transgender individuals from arrest and prosecution under Paragraph 183.

Provisions of Paragraph 183 have remained in effect since its 1871 adoption, but it has been amended and modified several times to change the nature of the law and its scope (1876, 1939, 1969, 1973, 1998, 2008, 2015, 2021), now solely referring to indecent exposure. The most recent version of Paragraph 183 (adopted in 2021) stipulates that "A man who harasses another person by an exhibitionistic act shall be punished with imprisonment not exceeding one year or with a fine."

It's the only remaining criminal law in Germany that can only be broken by one gender. Due to this its constitutionality has been repeatedly called into question by law scholars. It has been especially called into questions since the only case that has been brought up to the constitutional court regarding this law has been dismissed by the court in 1999, citing an old ruling of the court from 1954 in which it upheld the exclusive criminalization of male homosexual acts. The repeal of the respective law (Paragraph 175) in 1994 and the rehabilitation of all affected in 2017 revitalized the discussions surrounding Paragraph 183.

In 2017 a commission of the federal department of justice recommended the removal of Paragraph 183 (8-4 Votes in the commission) or at least a gender neutral wording (9-3 Votes) as to combat the constitutional concerns regarding Article 3 of the basic law.

== See also ==
- LGBT rights in Germany
- Transgender rights in Germany
- LGBT history in Germany
- Transvestite pass
- Cross-dressing
- Transgender people in Nazi Germany
- Persecution of homosexuals in Nazi Germany
