= Persecution of transgender people in Nazi Germany =

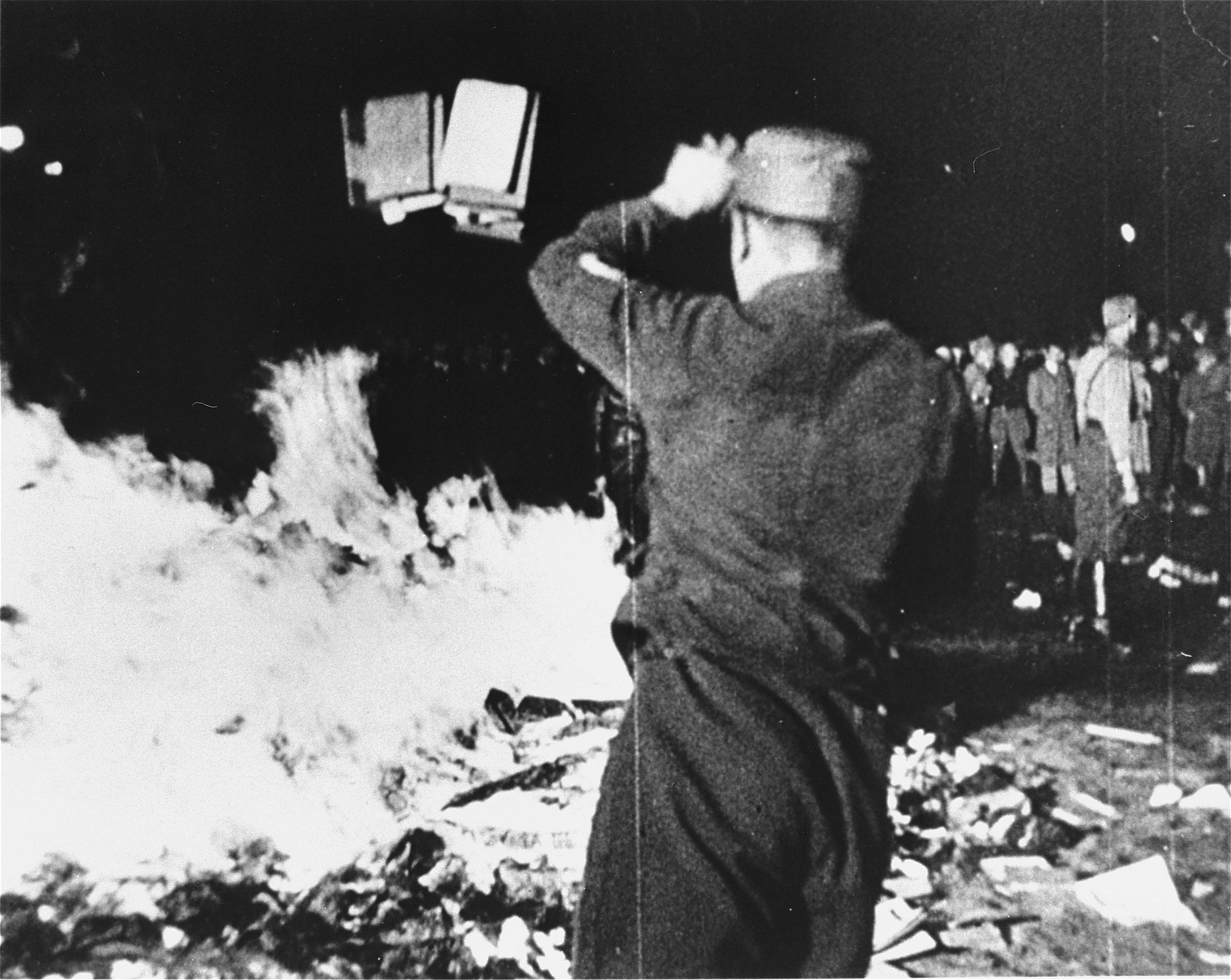
Tens of thousands of books, many of which were taken from the Institute for Sexual Science and concerned transgender topics, are burned in Opernplatz Square on 10 May 1933.

In Nazi Germany, transgender people were prosecuted, barred from public life, forcibly detransitioned, and imprisoned and killed in concentration camps. Though some factors, such as whether they were considered "Aryan", heterosexual with regard to their birth sex, or capable of useful work had the potential to mitigate their circumstances, transgender people were largely stripped of legal status by the Nazi state.

Under the German Empire (from 1871 to 1918) and Weimar Germany (from 1918 to 1933), laws such as Paragraph 183 existed which were used to prosecute transgender individuals. These laws were inconsistently enforced, often leaving transgender people vulnerable to the arbitrary decisions of individual police officers. In 1908, due to the advocacy of Magnus Hirschfeld, Germany instituted the ability for transgender people to obtain transvestite passes, which shielded them from legal consequences for being publicly transgender. From the end of World War I until 1933, transgender people enjoyed previously unprecedented freedoms and rights. Large leaps were made in transgender medicine through the Institute for Sexual Science, and transgender culture flourished in Berlin.

Following the 1932 Prussian coup d'état and the Nazi seizure of power in 1933, transgender movements, gathering places and institutions, such as the first homosexual movement, the Eldorado nightclubs, and the Institute for Sexual Science were dissolved, often by force. Trans women were targeted under renewed enforcement of Paragraphs 175 and 183. Trans men were persecuted under Paragraph 183, but did not face persecution under Paragraph 175, which applied only to those assigned male at birth. Transvestite passes were revoked or ignored. Books and texts relating to transgender experiences or medicine were destroyed as "un-German".

Transgender people were imprisoned and murdered in concentration camps, though the exact number killed is unknown. According to the Museum of Jewish Heritage, the German government "brutally targeted the trans community, deporting many trans people to concentration camps and wiping out vibrant community structures."

== Terminology ==
The term transgender, an English-German cognate, was not coined until 1965 and not widely accepted as a universal term until the 1990s. The German word transsexualismus (lit. 'transsexualism', adapted into English as the term transsexual) was first coined in 1923 by Magnus Hirschfeld, but would not enter widespread use until 30 years later with the work of Harry Benjamin. Before these terms, in German the term transvestit (lit. 'transvestite', masculine) was used to refer to transfeminine individuals, and the term transvestitin (lit. 'transvestite', feminine) was used to refer to transmasculine individuals. In part because no alternative term was widespread, most Western transgender people of this time period self-identified as "transvestites". Modern literature on the subject largely uses the term "transgender" to refer to these individuals as a more accurate description of their gender identity. According to Joanne Meyerowitz and other scholars of the topic, it is difficult if not outright impossible to know what pronouns transgender or transvestite people in these times would have preferred, and as such it is common practice to simply use the pronouns which align with what is known of their gender presentation (i.e., he/him for individuals who present masculine, and she/her for individuals who present feminine).

== Background ==
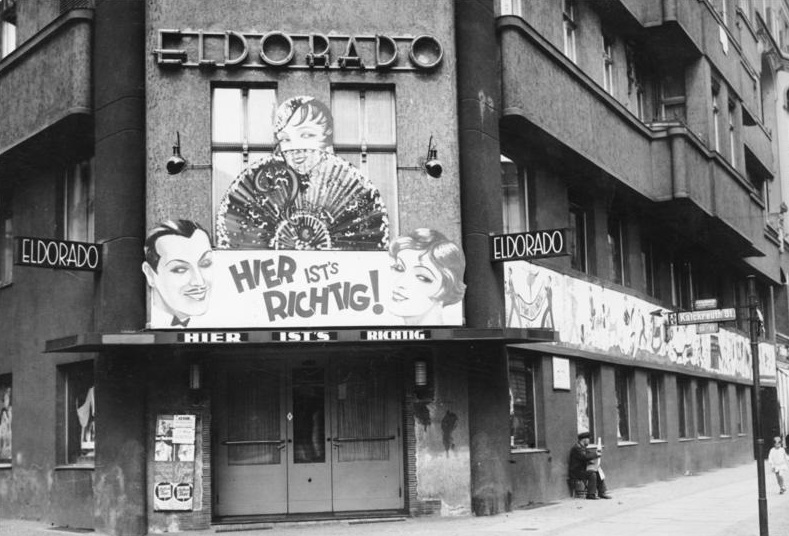
One of Berlin's famous Eldorado nightclubs, which often featured transgender performers and allowed crossdressing, displaying the slogan Hier ist's richtig! ("Here it's right!")

In the Weimar Republic, the government which ruled Germany from the end of World War I in 1918 until Adolf Hitler seized power in 1933, transgender people gained rights and freedoms unprecedented in Europe at the time, and much early progress was made in transgender medicine. The key figure in these advancements was Jewish-German physician and sexologist Magnus Hirschfeld, who founded both the Scientific-Humanitarian Committee in 1897—the main organisation devoted to the decriminalisation of homosexuality—and the Institut für Sexualwissenschaft (Institute for Sexual Science) in 1919. Other notable transgender rights activists of the period include Friedrich Radszuweit, a publisher and author who founded the Bund für Menschenrecht (Federation for Human Rights) to advocate for gay and transgender rights in 1920, and Max Spohr, a publisher among the first to print LGBT media.

=== Social situation ===
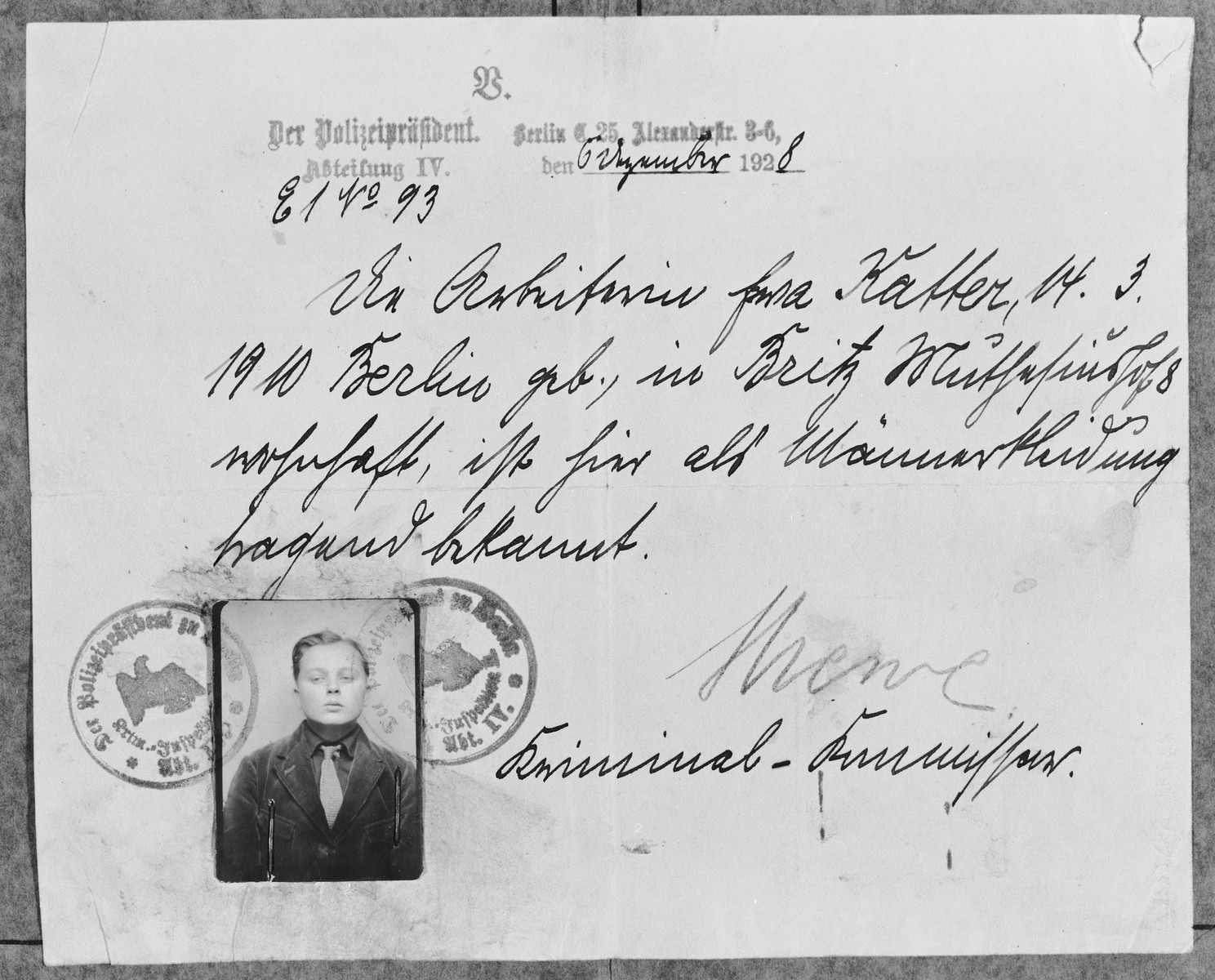
A transvestite pass issued to Gerd Katter by the Berlin Police in 1928

Under the German Empire before World War I, there was no law which explicitly outlawed being transgender, unlike how Paragraph 175 explicitly outlawed male-male homosexuality. Paragraph 183 outlawed public crossdressing, which along with Paragraph 360 (a public nuisance law) was sometimes used against transgender people; however, these laws could only be applied if a public nuisance was determined to have occurred. Additionally, in practice these laws could not be applied to transgender people who were able to pass as their preferred gender. These qualities often led to uneven enforcement of the laws, and openly transgender or gender-queer people in Germany lived under constant threat of legal charges at the whim of individual police officers. In 1908, Hirschfeld discussed the matter with the Berlin Police, and convinced them to allow transgender people to obtain transvestite passes to avoid legal consequences for cross-dressing, one of the earliest known examples of legal recognition for transgender people.

In large part due to the less restrictive laws and LGBT-friendly culture of 1920s Berlin, known as the 'Golden Years', transgender culture began to flourish in the city, and Berlin became known as the queer capital of the world. In 1930, the world's first transgender magazine, Das 3. Geschlecht (The Third Gender), was published by Friedrich Radszuweit's publishing company in Berlin, as was Die Freundin (The Girlfriend), a lesbian magazine which would often publish articles for transgender women. In response to the advocacy of Hirschfeld and others of the first homosexual movement, the Weimar Republic even went so far as to permit legal name changes for transgender people.

Berlin was also notable in this period for its queer nightlife and transvestite cabaret clubs, the most recognised of which were the Eldorado clubs, but less famous venues such as the Mikado were also popular places to watch transgender performers. Eldorado was the name of at least five known clubs in Berlin which featured transgender performers, and were a popular gathering spot for Berlin's LGBT community, though heterosexual patrons were also welcome and common. The first of these clubs was opened in March 1924 by Ludwig Konjetschni, who went on to own three locations under the Eldorado name, at least two of which are known to have catered to gay audiences specifically. The Eldorado clubs were noted worldwide and drew international tourism to the city. Though the clubs were heavily concentrated in Berlin, other similar clubs featuring transgender performers are known to have existed in most major German cities during this period:

- Hannover: An Eldorado club, the only club known to use the Eldorado name outside Berlin, existed in Hannover in the early 1930s, however it closed after just six months of operation.
- Cologne: The Dornröschen (Note: German, lit. "Thorn Rose", meaning "Sleeping Beauty".) club featured transgender performers by the names of Tilla and Resi.
- Hamburg: Known to have some number of transgender-friendly entertainment venues.

=== Medical advancement ===
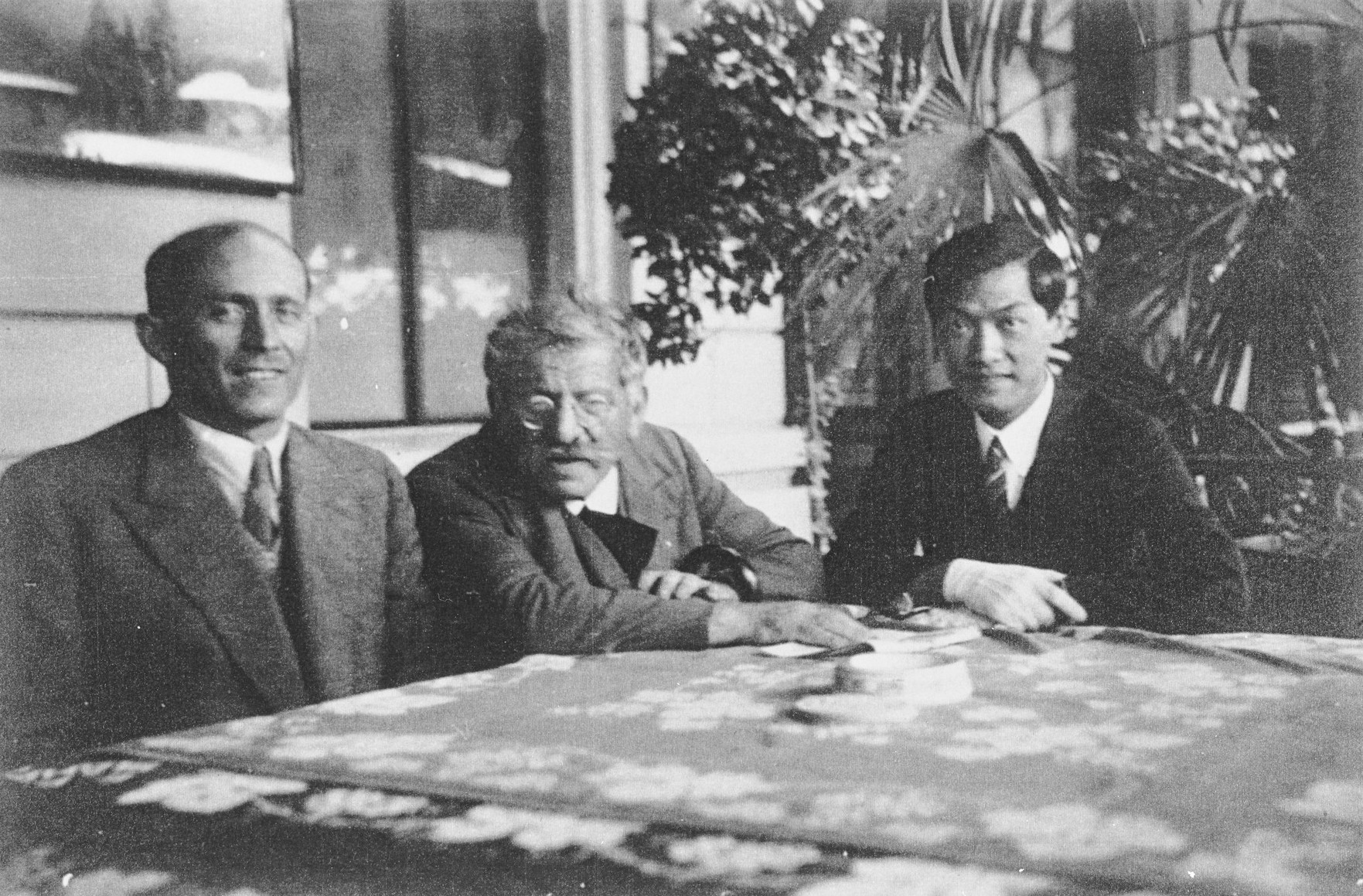
Bernhard Schapiro, Magnus Hirschfeld, and Li Shiu Tong in Berlin (early 1930s)

In addition to more widespread cultural acceptance, Berlin also became a hotbed for research into transgender medicine. The Institute for Sexual Science, located in Berlin, performed some of the first academic studies of transgender medicine, and is credited with performing some of the first gender affirming care, including hormone replacement therapy. Ludwig Levy-Lenz, Erwin Gohrbandt and other surgeons associated with the Institute performed gender affirming surgery, including early versions of facial feminisation surgery and sex reassignment surgery on trans women, as well as facial masculinisation surgery, chest masculinisation surgery, and hysterectomy and oophorectomy on trans men. Dora Richter, the first transgender woman known to have received sex reassignment surgery, received it through the Institute, as did Lili Elbe, Toni Ebel, Gerd Katter and many other notable transgender people of this period. Levy-Lenz is quoted as saying of his time at the Institute, "Never have I operated upon more grateful patients."

The Institute collected extensive data on the transgender condition through interviews, surveys and clinical studies, and its research was some of the first to differentiate gender identity from sexual orientation. In his research for the Institute, Hirschfeld referred to transgender people as "total transvestites" or "extreme transvestites" as early as the 1920s, notably differentiating them from crossdressers, as well as stating his belief that there naturally existed people who had "characteristics that did not fit into heterosexual or binary categories". The institute also hosted the D'Eon Organisation, which was founded in 1930 to advocate trans rights, and was also one of the only employers who would hire openly transgender people, and would often hire transgender people in need of work as receptionists or maids; both Toni Ebel and Dora Richter found employment with the Institute in this way.

=== Early pushback ===
The homosexual movement and Institute for Sexual Science were frequent targets of conservatives such as the Nazi Party and both Catholic and Protestant churches, which accused the movements of "degeneracy", going against family values and promoting "un-German" ideas. A particular target of conservative ire were LGBT publications and magazines, which were grouped with pornographic magazines as "filth literature". Laws such as the 1926 Harmful Publications Act were pushed through by conservative movements to attempt to limit or regulate the contents of these publications.

Hirschfeld himself was also targeted both politically and in the press. After being physically attacked and beaten in Munich in 1921, a nationalist newspaper article celebrated, threatening that "the next time his skull might be crushed." In 1929, Der Stürmer depicted him in a cartoon by Philipp Rupprecht and attacked him for his ideas on sex, as well as his sexuality and Jewish background.

== Ransacking of the Institut für Sexualwissenschaft ==
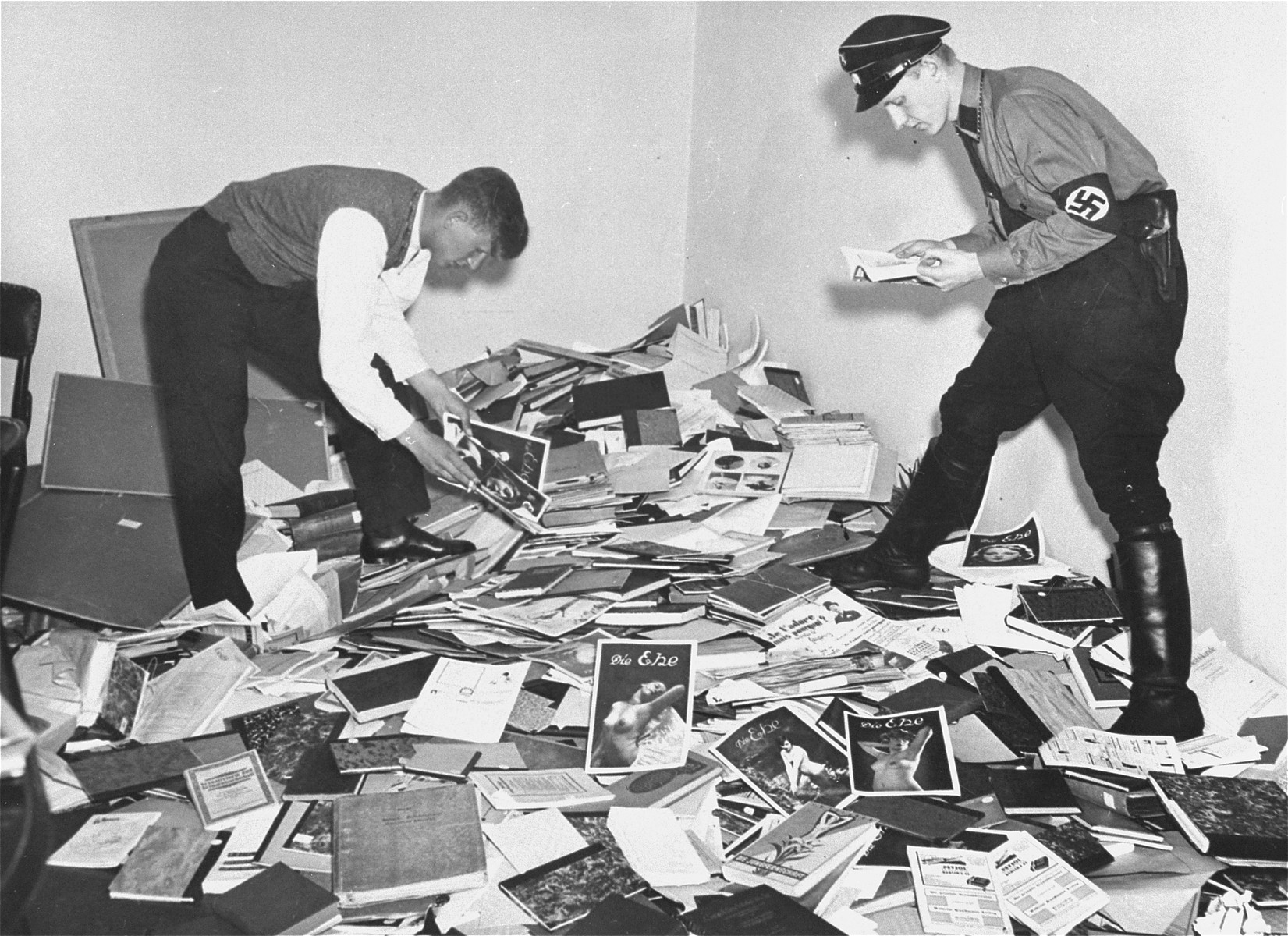
A member of the Sturmabteilung and a student examine materials taken from the personal library of Magnus Hirschfeld, director of the Institute for Sexual Science, on 6 May 1933, the day the Institute was raided and destroyed.

The beginning of the end for the Golden Years of Berlin occurred on 20 July 1932, when Franz von Papen orchestrated the 1932 Prussian coup d'état and took control of the Free State of Prussia as Reich Commissioner. Berlin was located in Prussia, and Papen, a conservative Catholic, began more strictly enforcing Paragraph 175 and other anti-homosexuality and anti-transvestitism laws in the region. Papen's government attempted to shut down presses printing "filth literature" altogether, though the courts were unwilling to cooperate with any attempted convictions, and the effort to shut down the publications was temporarily halted.

On 30 January 1933, Adolf Hitler, the leader of the Nazi Party, came to power as Chancellor of Germany. His government cracked down on gay and trans movements within Germany. On 6 May 1933, a group of students belonging to the National Socialist German Students' League, accompanied by a brass band, marched to the Institut für Sexualwissenschaft. After failing to find Hirschfeld, who was abroad, the students proceeded to shout "Brenne Hirschfeld!" ("Burn Hirschfeld!") while ransacking and vandalising the Institute, tearing pictures from the walls, pouring inkwells onto carpets, and destroying exhibitions while the band played outside. Some students posed for propaganda photos amidst the destruction. That afternoon, the Sturmabteilung (SA) arrived and systematically confiscated the Institute's materials, including thousands of books and documents from its library and archive. The only documents spared were the thousands of medical questionnaires collected by Hirschfeld, either because the Institute's staff managed to convince the SA that the documents were simple medical profiles, or because there were physically too many to carry out of the Institute. Dora Richter was long believed to have been murdered in the attack until a paper trail of her life after 1933 was unearthed.

The Institute was closed, and would never reopen. Four days later, on 10 May 1933, as many as 25,000 of the Institute's books, many of which contained unique insights into transgender history and medicine, were burned in nearby Opernplatz Square. Hirschfeld remained in exile in France until his death in 1935 rather than return to face persecution as a gay, Jewish man. His image would be subsequently widely reproduced for use in Nazi propaganda, citing him as a prototypical Jew. Following the closure of the Institute, some of its staff, such as Ludwig Levy-Lenz (who was also Jewish), fled Germany. However, a few of the Institute's former personnel, including Erwin Gohrbandt, collaborated with the Nazi regime. Joining the Luftwaffe as a medical advisor, he later contributed to human experimentation in the Dachau concentration camp, where transgender people like the ones he once treated are known to have been imprisoned and murdered.

== Nazi views on transgender people ==
Generally, Nazi ideology considered transgender, non-binary or other gender-non conforming identities as mental illnesses which could (and should) be cured. One goal of the Nazi government was to restore and enforce traditional conservative gender roles within German society compared to the more open Weimar Germany, which meant suppressing transgender identities as well as gender non-conforming ones such as butch lesbians and effeminate gay men. Within the legal system, transvestism or having a transgender identity was often considered an aggravating factor in a homosexuality case, causing transgender women to face even harsher sentences than if they had been considered homosexual men, though transgender people could face persecution even if Nazi authorities did not consider them to be homosexual.

Though transgender women in Nazi Germany were treated as crossdressing men under the law and by law enforcement, and were often arrested and tried under the same Paragraph 175 as homosexual men, Laurie Marhoefer argues that "Nazi officials did not simply think trans women were gay men", while Matt Fuller and Leah Owen point to the varied justifications provided by the Nazis for their targeting of queer people broadly as showing a conflation of trans issues with homosexuality. Bodie Ashton, a professor of German and LGBT history at the University of Erfurt, has called the Nazi government's understanding of transgender people "broadly inconsistent", and says that the Nazi government generally did not make attempts to understand transgender individuals beyond base assumptions about them. In a document outlining the division of labour in the Reich office for the Combatting of Homosexuality and Abortion, "transvestites" were listed as a responsibility of the organisation, separately from "all manifestations of homosexuality" and "combating of all enemies of positive population growth", suggesting trans identity was conceived of as a distinct issue and threat by the Nazis.

Fuller and Owen further argued that transmasculine and transfeminine individuals faced inconsistent treatment. Masculine presentations from those assigned female at birth were stigmatised: the National Socialist Women's League published a book in 1934 which warned gender ambiguity represented "signs of degeneration emanating from an alien race ... inimical to reproduction and for this reason damaging to the Volk. Healthy races do not artificially blur sexual differences" and Himmler complained in 1937 about the "nauseat[ing] catastrophe that was masculinising ['young girls and women'] so that, over time, the difference between the sexes, the polarity, is blurred. From there, the path to homosexuality is not too far off." There is an inconsistency in individual accounts of transmasculine people. One was forcibly detransitioned, another was detained in Lichtenburg concentration and released 10 months later with a permit from the Gestapo to wear men's clothing, and another was allowed to dress as a man without a permit following a medical examination and a promise that they had never engaged in homosexual relations.

== Transgender life under Nazi rule ==
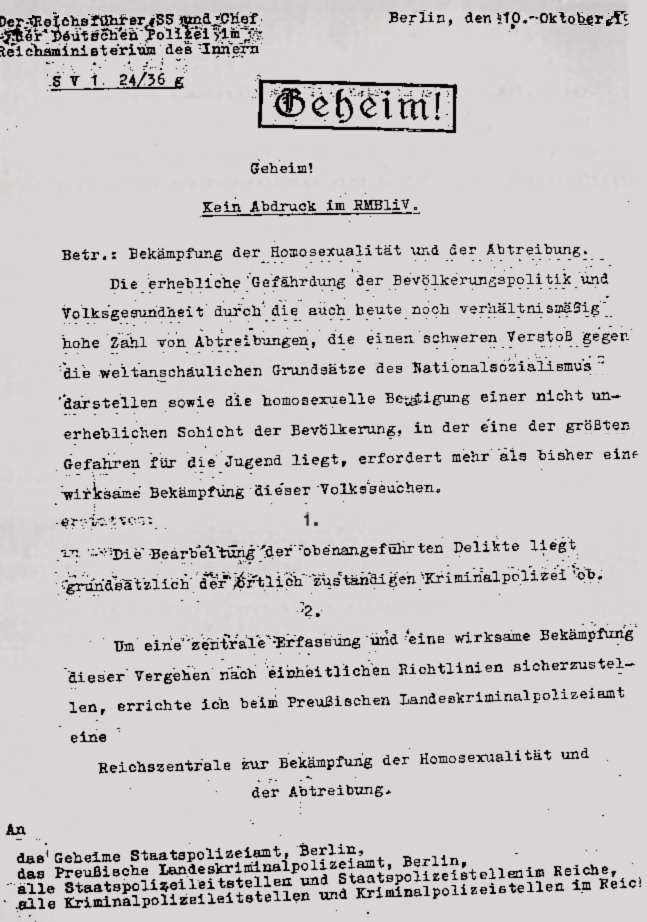
The 1936 order by Heinrich Himmler establishing the Reich Central Office for the Combating of Homosexuality and Abortion

=== Persecution ===
On 10 October 1936, the Reichszentrale zur Bekämpfung der Homosexualität und der Abtreibung (Reich Central Office for the Combating of Homosexuality and Abortion) was created by decree of Heinrich Himmler to establish guidelines on prosecuting homosexuality, and coordinating the prosecution of transgender people was generally also considered within its jurisdiction. Specifically, the Reich Central Office for the Combating of Homosexuality and Abortion was designated responsible by the Nazi government for "collaborating in the design of the security police's treatment of sexual degenerates", such as "transvestites, fetishists, and others." However, the Gestapo's homosexuality department retained some authority on the area of transgender people as well.

According to the Museum of Jewish Heritage, the Nazi government "brutally targeted the trans community, deporting many trans people to concentration camps and wiping out vibrant community structures." Transgender people (in particular male-to-female individuals) were often persecuted under the same Paragraph 175 widely used to target homosexuals, although there exist known instances of individuals being charged under Paragraph 183 alone, a public indecency law which was used as prohibition of cross-dressing. The Nazi government shut down several magazines published by transgender people, though some such as Das 3. Geschlecht had already ceased by 1933 following Friedrich Radszuweit's death in March 1932. Under von Papen's orders, in the summer of 1932, a series of raids had been carried out against gay, lesbian and transgender bars, and it was announced that these places would no longer be able to acquire dance permits. By early 1933, the Eldorado nightclubs are believed to have all shut down. Under Nazi rule, the vast majority of "Transvestitenscheine" (transvestite passes) given to transgender people under Weimar rule were revoked, or in many cases simply ignored by the police. In his 1938 book, Ein Beitrag zum Problem des Transvestitismus, anatomist Hermann Voss espoused the benefits of Nazi persecution of transgender people.

Race played a role in how transgender people were treated under the Nazi regime. According to historian Zavier Nunn, trans people could be spared the worst of the Nazis' violence if they were considered Aryan and not considered homosexual (i.e., they were exclusively attracted to the opposite of the sex assigned to them at birth). Furthermore, their circumstances could be mitigated if they were capable of useful work. Nunn provides a particular case study of a transgender lesbian known as R., who the Nazis considered to be Aryan, non-homosexual and a good worker, who was arrested in 1938 but released after two years in prison on the assumption that she would detransition. R. reneged, continuing her non-conformist behaviors, and in 1941 re-arrested. On 10 November 1941, R. was transferred to the Berlin-Wittenau Medical Center to undergo conversion therapy so she could "become a functioning member of the Volksgemeinschaft". She remained in Wittenau until her death by suspected suicide on 12 March 1943.

=== Identification ===
Due in part to the inherent difficulty in identifying transgender people who can pass as their preferred gender, as well as identifying gender non-conforming people who may conform when in public, the Nazi government relied heavily on reporting by private citizens (often neighbors) to persecute transgender people. A widespread belief in Germany at this time held that transgender people were inherently deceitful, as they lived their lives "in disguise", which motivated some Germans to denounce them to the Nazi government. During the First World War, this belief was so ubiquitous that transgender organisations urged members to wear clothes associated with their birth sex for the sake of their personal safety. However, many Germans were simply motivated to denounce queer and transgender people due to their personal belief in Nazi ideology and desire to make the idealised Nazi state a reality. Heather Panter, writing in the book Genocide and Victimology, noted that the number of transgender people targeted by the Nazis was likely lower than the number of gay people targeted.

=== Imprisonment in concentration camps ===
Many transgender people were imprisoned and murdered in Nazi concentration camps, though it is unknown exactly how many were killed or died as a result of their mistreatment. As straight transgender women were viewed by the Nazis as a subset or variation of homosexual men—a sexuality whose manifestations in Germany the Nazis aimed to completely suppress—they were particularly targeted. Even in cases where transgender individuals were not killed or imprisoned in concentration camps, they were, with few exceptions, barred from being transgender in public life, and there is at least one recorded case of a transgender German being driven to suicide due to their forced detransition. Individual precincts and districts are also known to have taken specific action against transgender people. For example, as part of the 1933 mass incarceration of gay men in Fuhlsbüttel concentration camp, on 11 November 1933, the city of Hamburg ordered its police department to "observe the transvestites in particular, and as required to send them to concentration camps".

According to historian Laurie Marhoefer "the Nazi state reserved its worst violence for trans women." A gay prisoner and survivor of the Lichtenburg concentration camp named Kurt von Ruffin recalled that camp officials often treated trans people with particular contempt. Incoming transgender women to the camp would be "stripped out of their women's clothes and then humiliated, insulted and beaten." Ruffin recalled hearing of one occasion where a transgender woman was forced to undress, then had her head forcibly shoved into a dirty latrine until she drowned.

Lucy Salani was the only known Italian transgender person known to have survived imprisonment in the concentration camps, including the Dachau concentration camp. She died in 2023. At least one Austrian trans woman, referred to as Bella P., is known to have been imprisoned in a concentration camp after a sentence under a law targeting "unnatural fornication". Another trans woman, known only as "H. Bode" is known to have been killed in the Buchenwald Concentration Camp.

In one notable example, German transgender woman and sex worker Liddy Bacroff submitted a request for a 'voluntary' castration on 4 April 1938, following an arrest for crossdressing and being on a date at a restaurant with a man. A repeat violator of German anti-homosexuality and anti-prostitution laws, including Paragraph 175, Bacroff requested "to be cured of my sick passion which has led me onto the path of prostitution". She was examined by Wilhelm Reuss, a medical examiner from the Hamburg Health Department, who concluded that "H. (Note: In reference to Heinrich Habitz, Bacroff's birth name.) is a transvestite to his [sic] core. Accordingly his [sic] entire habitus is feminine and infantile, the voice eunuchoid". He further speculated that castration would only embolden Barcroff, as she was never the penetrating partner in her sex work. Reuss's report was effectively a death sentence. Bacroff was subsequently remanded to prison, and in late 1942, transferred to the Mauthausen concentration camp, where she was killed on 6 January 1943.

Transgender men are also known to have been targeted in Nazi Germany, though their treatment differed in some regards from transgender women, and some were even able to continue their lives publicly. One trans man, known by the masculine nicknames "Kleener" (Note: German, meaning "Tiny".) and "Dicker", (Note: German, meaning "Tubby".) was arrested for crossdressing in August 1940, but was released after promising to wear women's clothing in public. A postal worker known as Gerd W., who was a transgender man, petitioned in 1940 to have his transvestite pass restored after unhappily attempting to live as a woman. Although his pass was not restored, he was given permission to dress as a man so long as he did not have sexual relations with women. Another transgender man, Gerd Kubbe, had his transvestite pass revoked in 1933. He was arrested in January 1938 for crossdressing into "protective custody" on the orders of Reinhard Heydrich and imprisoned at the Lichtenburg concentration camp. However, in October 1938, he too was released, his transvestite pass restored, even granted special permission from the Gestapo to continue wearing men's clothes and use a masculine name, though he was barred from using public restrooms or baths while wearing men's clothing.

There exist many open questions about the imprisonment of transgender people in Nazi concentration camps. It is unknown, for example, exactly how many transgender people were killed in the concentration camps. Some records pertaining to the transgender people sent to the concentration camps are vague and open ended. In the case of German trans woman and club proprietor Toni Simon, her file's final document calls her a "danger to youth" and recommends sending her to a concentration camp as "absolutely necessary", without any further information on her fate. Fritz Kitzing, an individual who was assigned male at birth but presented as both female and male at different points in their life, was denounced by one of their neighbors in 1935 as transgender and was imprisoned without trial in Lichtenburg and later Sachsenhausen after being labeled "a transvestite of the worst kind" by the Gestapo. They were briefly released in 1938, but were rearrested on a charge of "atrocity propaganda" for sending a letter detailing their experiences in the concentration camps to a friend in London, after which no further records of them are known to exist.

== Recognition and remembrance ==
=== Recognition ===
"Transgender" became widely recognised as an identity beginning only in the late 20th century, and the fight for legal recognition and rights for transgender people is an ongoing movement. In 2023, historian Laurie Marhoefer noted, "Up until the past few years, there had been little research on trans people under the Nazi regime." It was not until the 2010s and 2020s that transgender people began to be recognised as victims of the Nazis and the Holocaust.

On 23 June 2017, the Bundestag voted to compensate victims of Paragraph 175. Those affected by the law had their convictions rescinded, and were given reparations of €3,000 ($3,350 in USD) plus an additional €1,500 ($1,675 in USD) for each year spent in prison.

On 27 January 2023, the German government dedicated its annual Holocaust memorial commemoration to lesbian, bisexual, gay and transgender victims of the Holocaust. This marked the first time the German government had granted official recognition to transgender people as victims of the Holocaust. In a speech given at the commemoration, German Bundestag President Bärbel Bas stated "For our remembrance culture, it's important that we tell the stories of all victims of persecution, that we make their injustice visible, that we recognize their suffering." Transgender people have also been recognised or commemorated as victims of the Holocaust by the Human Rights Campaign, Amnesty International, the European Parliament, the Museum of Jewish Heritage, and the United Nations.

Sociologist Matthew Waites has argued that those targeted by the Nazis because of their non-conforming gender identities should be recognized as a genocide unique from the Holocaust.

=== Denialism ===
Matt Fuller and Leah Owen argued that while Nazi anti-queer ideology was "incoherent and erratic", they targeted transgender people with extermination and memoricide, citing the looting and burning of the books at the Institute for Sexual Science as an example of this memoricide. Fuller and Owen point out research conducted by Heike Bauer into the work of Magnus Hirschfeld at the Institute for Sexual Science, to explain a psychological element to this, stating "the mere presence of the bodies and desires of trans people was a challenge, threat, and source of anxiety to many Nazis, meaning they – or the physical archive that reflected their identity – had to be destroyed."

In 2022, the Regional Court of Cologne ruled that denying that transgender people were victims of the Nazis qualifies as "a denial of Nazi crimes". The ruling was an outcome of the civil libel suit of German biologist Marie-Luise Vollbrecht, who alleged libel against the German Society for Trans Identity and Intersexuality over their response to comments she made calling transgender people not "true victims" of Nazi crimes. The court ultimately ruled that she had to accept the response made to her comments labelling her as a denialist. Laurie Marhoefer gave an expert statement on the case that was not ultimately presented to the court, writing "though there is a bit of variation and disorganization, and race matters, we see a pattern of state violence and oppression here, motivated by a hostility specific to transgender people."

On 13 March 2024, author J.K. Rowling tweeted a series of responses to an anonymous critic, who argued that Rowling was upholding Nazi ideals for her viewpoints of transgender rights, in which Rowling contended that transgender people were not targeted in the Holocaust. These tweets caused some, including civil rights attorney Alejandra Caraballo, to accuse her of Holocaust denial. On 14 March 2024, Rowling responded to the accusations in a post on her personal website, calling them "baseless and disgusting" and stating that she had "always been a staunch supporter of the Jewish community".

== See also ==
- First homosexual movement
- Persecution of homosexuals in Nazi Germany
- Lesbians in Nazi Germany
- Transgender history § Germany
- Institut für Sexualwissenschaft
- Transgender genocide

== Works cited ==
=== Books ===
- Bartrop, Paul R.; Dickerman, Michael (2017). The Holocaust: An Encyclopedia and Document Collection [4 volumes]. ABC-CLIO. pp. 457–458. ISBN 978-1-4408-4084-5.
- Beachy, Robert (2014). Gay Berlin: birthplace of a modern identity. New York: Alfred A. Knopf. ISBN 978-0307272102.
- Dose, Ralf (2014). Magnus Hirschfeld: The Origins of the Gay Liberation Movement. Monthly Review Press. ISBN 9781583674390.
- Hirschfeld, Magnus (1923). "Die Intersexuelle Konstitution" [The Intersexual Constitution]. Jahrbuch für sexuelle Zwischenstufen [Yearbook for Intermediate Sexual Types] (in German).
- Marhoefer, Laurie (2015). Sex and the Weimar Republic: German Homosexual Emancipation and the Rise of the Nazis. University of Toronto Press.
- Meyerowitz, Joanne (2009). How Sex Changed: A History of Transsexuality in the United States. Harvard University Press. ISBN 9780674040960.
- Newsome, William Jake (2022). Pink Triangle Legacies: Coming Out in the Shadow of the Holocaust. Cornell University Press. doi:10.1515/9781501765506. ISBN 9781501765506.
- Panter, Heather (2020). "LGBT+ Genocide: Understanding hetero-nationalism and the politics of psychological silence". In Eski, Yarin (ed.). Genocide and Victimology. Routledge. ISBN 978-0-429-85844-4.
- Whisnant, Clayton J. (2012). Queer Identities and Politics in Germany: A History, 1880–1945. Springer. ISBN 9781939594099.
- Wolff, Charlotte (1986). Magnus Hirschfeld: A Portrait of a Pioneer in Sexology. Quartet Books. ISBN 0-7043-2569-1.

=== Articles ===
- Alessandrin, Arnaud (22 June 2020). "Transidentities: the History of a Category". Encyclopédie d'histoire numérique de l'Europe. ISSN 2677-6588.
- Ashton, Bodie A (21 December 2023). "The Parallel Lives of Liddy Bacroff: Transgender (Pre)History and the Tyranny of the Archive in Twentieth-Century Germany". German History. 42 (1): 79–100. doi:10.1093/gerhis/ghad071.
- Bauer, Heike (2017). The Hirschfeld Archives: Violence, Death, and Modern Queer Culture. Philadelphia: Temple University Press. doi:10.17613/M6M20D. ISBN 978-1439914335.
- Bhinder, Jasmine; Upadhyaya, Prashant (2021). "Brief History of Gender Affirmation Medicine and Surgery". Urological Care for the Transgender Patient. pp. 249–254. doi:10.1007/978-3-030-18533-6_19. ISBN 978-3-030-18532-9.
- Caplan, Jane (1 October 2011). "The Administration of Gender Identity in Nazi Germany". History Workshop Journal. 72 (1): 173–174. doi:10.1093/hwj/dbr021. PMID 22206119.
- Crocq, Marc-Antoine (6 December 2021). "How gender dysphoria and incongruence became medical diagnoses – a historical review". Dialogues in Clinical Neuroscience. 23 (1): 44–51. doi:10.1080/19585969.2022.2042166. ISSN 1958-5969. PMC 9286744. PMID 35860172.
- Fisher, Kate; Funke, Jana (February 2016). "Sexual science beyond the medical". The Lancet. 387 (10021): 840–841. doi:10.1016/S0140-6736(16)00517-1. PMID 26977480.
- Fuller, Matt; Owen, Leah (2 October 2022). "Nazi Gender Ideology, Memoricide, and the Attack on the Berlin Institute for Sexual Research". Peace Review. 34 (4): 529–540. doi:10.1080/10402659.2022.2131383. ISSN 1040-2659. S2CID 252791832.
- "Magnus Hirschfeld". Holocaust Encyclopedia. United States Holocaust Memorial Museum. 17 December 2021.
- Li, Alison (11 December 2023). "Harry Benjamin and the birth of transgender medicine". Canadian Medical Association Journal. 195 (48): E1665–E1667. doi:10.1503/cmaj.231436. PMC 10718274. PMID 38081632.
- Marhoefer, Laurie (2016). "Lesbianism, Transvestitism, and the Nazi State: A Microhistory of a Gestapo Investigation, 1939–1943". The American Historical Review. 121 (4): 1167–1195. doi:10.1093/ahr/121.4.1167.
- Marhoefer, Laurie (3–6 January 2020). Paper: Trans Identities and 'Cross Dressing' in Nazi Germany: Trans People as a Discrete Target of State Violence. 134th Annual Meeting American Historical Association. Archived from the original on 3 January 2023.
- Marhoefer, Laurie (December 2023). "Transgender Life and Persecution under the Nazi State: Gutachten on the Vollbrecht Case". Central European History. 56 (4): 595–601. doi:10.1017/S0008938923000468.
- Micheler, Stephen (2008). "Zeitschriften, Verbände und Lokale" (PDF). Archived from the original (PDF) on 14 January 2024.
- Polly, Nicole J (2011). "Understanding the transsexual patient: culturally sensitive care in emergency nursing practice". Advanced Emergency Nursing Journal. 33 (1): 55–64. doi:10.1097/TME.0b013e3182080ef4. PMID 21317698. S2CID 2481961.
- Nunn, Zavier (2022). "Trans Liminality and the Nazi State". Past and Present (260): 123–157. doi:10.1093/pastj/gtac018.
- Nunn, Zavier (August 2023). "Against anticipation, or, camp reading as reparative to the trans feminine past: A microhistory in Nazi-Era Vienna". Gender & History. 36 (1): 191–207. doi:10.1111/1468-0424.12721.
- Reiter-Zatloukal, Ilse (January 2015). "Geschlechtswechsel unter der NS-Herrschaft "Transvestitismus", Namensänderung und Personenstandskorrektur in der "Ostmark" am Beispiel der Fälle Mathilde/Mathias Robert S. und Emma/Emil Rudolf K." [Gender change under Nazi rule "transvestism", name change and civil status correction in the "Ostmark" using the example of the cases Mathilde/Mathias Robert S. and Emma/Emil Rudolf K.]. Beiträge zur Rechtsgeschichte Österreichs [Papers on the Legal History of Austria] (in German). 1. University of Vienna: 172–209. doi:10.1553/BRGOE2014-1s172.
- Sutton, Katie (2012). ""We Too Deserve a Place in the Sun": The Politics of Transvestite Identity in Weimar Germany". German Studies Review. 35 (2): 348. doi:10.1353/gsr.2012.a478043. JSTOR 23269669. Archived from the original on 29 March 2023.
- Vicente, Marta V (23 September 2021). "The Medicalization of the Transsexual: Patient-Physician Narratives in the First Half of the Twentieth Century". Journal of the History of Medicine and Allied Sciences. 76 (4): 392–416. doi:10.1093/jhmas/jrab037. ISSN 0022-5045. PMID 34553224. Archived from the original on 2 July 2023.
- Waites, Matthew (2018). "Genocide and Global Queer Politics". Journal of Genocide Research. 20 (1): 44–67. doi:10.1080/14623528.2017.1358920. S2CID 148737818.

=== Press ===
- Anarte, Enrique (27 January 2023). "German parliament remembers LGBTQ+ victims of the Nazis". Reuters. Berlin, Germany. Archived from the original on 17 March 2024.
- Connelly, Irene Katz (7 June 2023). "It was a pioneering trans library — until the Nazis burned it". The Forward. Archived from the original on 26 October 2023.
- Caraballo, Alejandra; Delaware, Mary (21 June 2023). "To protect gender-affirming care, we must learn from trans history". harvardpublichealth.org. Harvard Public Health. Archived from the original on 31 January 2024.
- Carlo, Andrea (7 April 2022). "How LGBTQ Victims Were Erased From Holocaust History". Time. Archived from the original on 8 June 2023.
- Fox, Mira (13 March 2024). "It wasn't just the goblins — is J.K. Rowling doing Holocaust denial now?". The Forward. Archived from the original on 13 March 2024.
- "German parliament spotlights Nazis' LGBTQ victims for first time". France 24. 27 January 2023. Archived from the original on 14 March 2024.
- Hayes, Britt (13 March 2024). "J.K. Rowling's Transphobia Hits a New Low With Holocaust Denial". The Mary Sue. Archived from the original on 14 March 2024.
- "Holocaust Memorial Day Trust | 6 May 1933: Looting of the Institute of Sexology". Holocaust Memorial Day Trust. 13 March 2024. Archived from the original on 13 March 2024.
- Hutton, Alice (25 December 2018). "Gay Life in Berlin Is Starting to Echo a Darker Era". The Atlantic. Archived from the original on 14 March 2024.
- Kuhrt, Aro (1 June 2015). "Das Eldorado" [The Eldorado]. Berlin Street (in German). Archived from the original on 29 July 2015.
- Lim, Megan; Yu, Mallory; Chang, Ailsa (1 March 2023). "A pioneering gender-affirming health institute opened in 1919 in Berlin". NPR. Archived from the original on 21 September 2023.
- Marhoefer, Laurie (6 June 2023). "Historians are learning more about how the Nazis targeted trans people". The Conversation. Archived from the original on 8 June 2023.
- "Morta Lucy Fasani, l'unica transessuale sopravvissuta ai campi di concentramento nazisti: aveva quasi 99 anni" [Lucy Fasani, the only transgender survivor of the Nazi concentration camps, has died at the age of 99.]. Il Messaggero (in Italian). 22 March 2023. Archived from the original on 14 March 2024.
- "Transgender Experiences in Weimar and Nazi Germany". Museum of Jewish Heritage. 3 June 2022. Archived from the original on 28 June 2023.
- Romano, Aja (14 March 2024). "Is J.K. Rowling transphobic? Let's let her speak for herself". Vox. Archived from the original on 16 March 2024.
- Rosenkranz, Bernhard; Bollmann, Ulf; White, Joanna. "Liddy Bacroff (Heinrich Habitz)". raumdernamen.mauthausen-memorial.org. Mauthausen Concentration Camp Memorial. Archived from the original on 14 March 2024.
- Ross, Alex (19 January 2015). "Berlin Story". The New Yorker. Archived from the original on 1 July 2024.
- Rowling, Joanne (14 March 2024). "Statement from J.K. Rowling, 14th March 2024". jkrowling.com. Archived from the original on 6 April 2024.
- Schillace, Brandy (10 May 2021). "The Forgotten History of the World's First Trans Clinic". Scientific American. Archived from the original on 13 March 2024.
- Sosin, Kate (31 October 2025). "Holocaust Researcher Says Up to 1/3 of Imprisoned LGBTQ+ People Reported by Friends and Family". Them.us. Archived from the original on 11 November 2025.
- Steinkopf-Frank, Hannah (7 June 2023). "Publishing Queer Berlin". JSTOR Daily. Archived from the original on 31 March 2024.
- Strochlic, Nina (29 June 2022). "The great hunt for the world's first LGBTQ archive". National Geographic. Archived from the original on 15 March 2024.
- "Was wurde aus Dora?" [What became of Dora?]. Tagesschau (in German). 29 May 2023. Archived from the original on 5 June 2023.
- "Prozess um Tweet zu NS-Verbrechen: Umstrittene Biologin der Berliner Humboldt-Uni unterliegt vor Gericht" [Trial over tweet about Nazi crimes: Controversial biologist from Berlin's Humboldt University loses in court]. Der Tagesspiegel (in German). 11 November 2022. Archived from the original on 27 March 2023.
- Thomasy, Hannah (28 March 2022). "A Rose for Dora Richter". Proto Magazine. Massachusetts General Hospital. Archived from the original on 24 March 2024.
- "Paragraph 175 and the Nazi Campaign against Homosexuality". The United States Holocaust Memorial Museum. Archived from the original on 12 January 2023.
- Wiggins, Christopher (27 January 2023). "LGBTQ+ Holocaust Victims Remembered for the First Time by German Parliament". The Advocate. Archived from the original on 17 March 2024.
