= Liddy Bacroff =

German transgender woman and victim of Nazi Germany (1908–1943)

- Police photo, 1933
- Born: 19 August 1908; Ludwigshafen, Kingdom of Bavaria, German Empire
- Died: 6 January 1943 (aged 34); Mauthausen concentration camp, Nazi Germany
- Occupations: Writer; sex worker
- Known for: Trans sex work in Berlin and Hamburg. Murdered by the Nazis

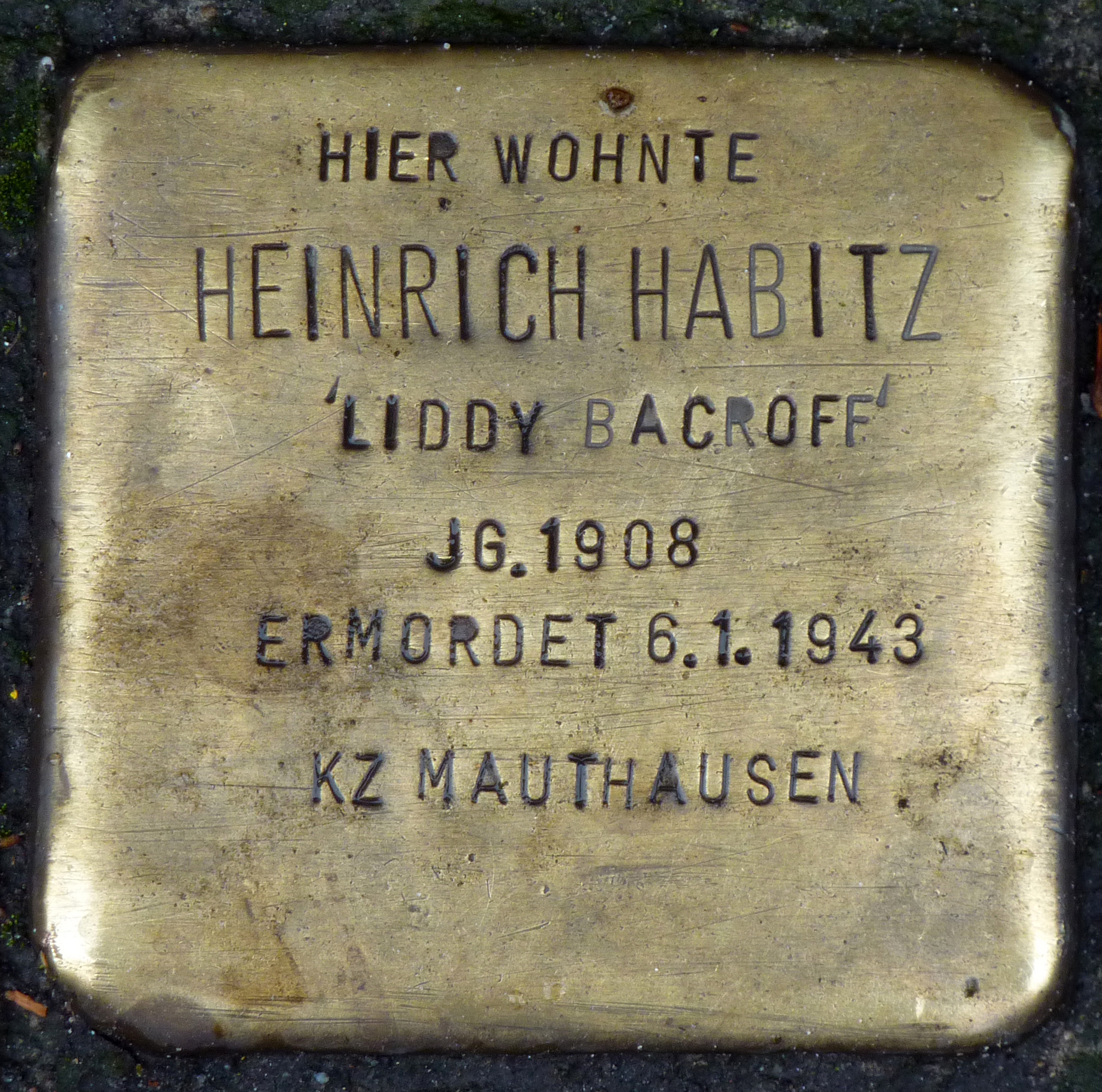
Stolperstein for Liddy Bacroff, introduced under her legal name

Liddy Bacroff (19 August 1908 – 6 January 1943) was a German performer and sex worker of the Weimar Republic era, persecuted and murdered by the Nazi regime during World War II. Bacroff rejected her male sex assigned at birth and self-identified as a "transvestite". Bacroff was imprisoned several times for "homosexual acts" under Paragraph 175 of the German Criminal Code and ultimately was murdered in the Mauthausen concentration camp.

== Life ==
Liddy Bacroff was first raised by her grandparents, and then adopted by Joseph Habitz, the later husband of her mother. Upon adoption she was given the legal name Heinrich Habitz, which later would not be changed. Bacroff was considered "difficult to raise" and was sent to reformatory for a year. After abandoning a mercantile internship, she worked several office and messenger jobs, and then became a circus "dance lady". In 1924, at the age of 16, Bacroff was first sentenced to six weeks in prison by the District Court of Ludwigshafen for an offense under Section 176 (3) of the Reich Criminal Code, which criminalized sexual offenses involving minors; later the penalty was waived. In 1929, she was sentenced by the District Court of Mannheim for a two-month prison sentence for "unnatural fornication" under Paragraph 175. In November 1929 Bacroff finally left Ludwigshafen and moved first to Berlin, and then to Hamburg, to be active in prostitution and transvesting/female impersonation shows under the name Liddy Bacroff.

In 1930, Bacroff was arrested for theft again and sentenced to two months in prison. Shortly after release from that sentence, Bacroff had to serve another month's imprisonment for trespassing. Almost a year later, in May 1931, Bacroff was sentenced again, this time to four months in prison for homosexual acts under Paragraph 175. In 1933 and 1934 Bacroff was sentenced to six and ten months in prison, respectively.

In prisons, Liddy Bacroff wrote two texts about her life: Freiheit! (Die Tragödie einer homosexuellen Liebe) (Freedom! The tragedy of a homosexual love) and Ein Erlebnis als Transvestit. Das Abenteuer einer Nacht in der Transvestitenbar Adlon! (An experience as a transvestite. The adventure of one night in the transvestite bar Adlon!).

In 1936, Liddy Bacroff was prosecuted for the first time under Section 4 of Paragraph 175 a of the German Criminal Code, which was newly introduced by the Nazis and made "commercial indecency" a punishable offense, and was sentenced by the Hamburg Regional Court to two years in the Bremen-Oslebshausen penitentiary with 3 years of "forfeiture of honor" (loss of civil rights).

After the prison release in January 1938, Liddy Bacroff tried to evade constant police surveillance by using forged registration papers – whereupon a wanted warrant was initiated. Two months later, on 25 March 1938, Liddy Bacroff was denounced when someone told the police that "a man in women's clothes" was sitting at a table with another man in the "Komet" restaurant. Both people were arrested. Bacroff's table partner said he thought he had met a woman. Bacroff told police that she was given permission to wear women's clothing by the police and that her "passion for men" was what led her to prostitution.

On 4 April 1938, Liddy Bacroff applied for "voluntary" castration. She was then examined by medical councillor Wilhelm Reuss from the Hamburg Health Department. The doctor classified Bacroff as "incurable transvestite" (who would continue to sell sexual services to men), which was tantamount to a death sentence.

On 22 August 1938, Liddy Bacroff was sentenced by the Hamburg Regional Court to three years in Zuchthaus with subsequent preventive detention for "commercial unnatural indecency" as a "dangerous habitual criminal".

After being held in custody by the Gestapo and on remand, Liddy Bacroff was transferred to the Bremen-Oslebshausen penitentiary in October 1938 and, after serving her sentence, was sent to the detention center in Rendsburg in October 1941. In November 1942 Liddy was transferred to the Hamburg police authorities and then taken to the Mauthausen concentration camp, where she was murdered on 6 January 1943.

== Legacy ==
At Bacroff's last place of residence in Hamburg (Simon-von-Utrecht-Straße 79), a Stolperstein was set. The life story of Liddy Bacroff can be heard as an audio recording on the website www.stolpersteine-hamburg.de. It quotes Bacroff's notes from her stay in prison.

In May 2016, Mannheim Theater Oliv staged the play named Will flirten, toben, schmeicheln! Lasst mich – ich bin Liddy (Want to flirt, romp, flatter! Let me - I'm Liddy), in which Bacroff's story was presented on stage on the basis of personal writings and other documents.

== See also ==
- List of people killed for being transgender
- Persecution of transgender people in Nazi Germany
