= Carl-Heinz Rodenberg =

German neurologist and psychiatrist

- Born: 19 November 1904; Heide, German Empire
- Died: 1995 (aged 90–91)
- Occupation: German Action T4 perpetrator

Carl-Heinz Rodenberg, sometimes known as Karl-Heinz Rodenberg (19 November 1904 in Heide – 1995) was a German neurologist and psychiatrist. Rodenberg was proficient in the murder of mental patients by the Nazis, the Action T4 "euthanasia" program, and from 1943 was scientific director of the Reich Central Office for the Combating of Homosexuality and Abortion (Reichszentrale zur Bekämpfung der Homosexualität und der Abtreibung).

== Life ==
The son of a physician, Rodenberg studied medicine and received his doctorate in 1930 from the University of Marburg with the thesis Über echte Kombinationen epileptischer und schizophrener Symptomkomplexe ("Concerning the real combinations of symptomatic epileptic and schizophrenic complexes"). As a practitioner of medicine, he worked in the university psychiatric clinic, later as a scientific assistant at the Max Planck Institute of Psychiatry in Munich and until 1934 as a doctor in the medical centre of Branitz, near Oppeln, in Upper Silesia.

Rodenberg joined the Nazi Party (NSDAP) and the Sturmabteilung (SA) on 20 April 1932. After the Nazi Machtergreifung (seizure of power) in 1933, Rodenberg became an employee of the NSDAP Office of Racial Policy. From 1934 he headed the department of hereditary health for the Oberpräsident of the Provincial Association of Upper Silesia. From 1936 he worked as a medical specialist in psychiatry and neurology, moving to Berlin in 1937. There he led the department for the care of race and heredity in the Reichsausschuß für den Volksgesundheitsdienst (Reich Committee for the Service of Public Health), was director of the Staatsmedizinischen Akademie (State Medical Academy), and also judge of the Hereditary Health Court on matters of compulsory sterilization. Starting on 1 March 1939, Rodenberg worked as a criminal biologist in the department for the care of race and heredity in the Reichsgesundheitsamt (Reich Office for Health).

From 28 February 1940 to 14 October 1940, Rodenberg was listed as an expert of the Action T4 euthanasia program. In this capacity he decided on the basis of questionnaires with the data of the sick and disabled who would live and who would die in the Action T4 euthanasia centers.

In 1940 Rodenberg tried to join the Schutzstaffel (SS). Being at that time an SA-Sturmbannführer health worker, a report confirmed that Rodenberg had been a long-time informant for the Sicherheitsdienst (SD). The report shows that Rodenberg had "provided the SD with valuable material on many occasions" and "in his work for the SD he has great interest. His placement in the SS [...] is therefore important." In the SS, Rodenberg was promoted on 30 January 1944 to SS-Obersturmbannführer. For the promotion, his "excellent attitude towards life, his spirit of camaraderie and his resolute presence" were noted.

In August 1942, Rodenberg was transferred to the Reich Security Main Office (RSHA), to Office group III B 3 (Race and Public Health). On 27 October 1942, he took part in a conference chaired by Adolf Eichmann of RSHA Referat IV B4 (RSHA Sub-Department IV-B4), which was a successor to the Wannsee Conference. The theme of the conference was the compulsory sterilisation of the "half Jews" (see also: Nuremberg Laws), which was to be offered as a "voluntary alternative" to deportation. The plan was never carried out.

On 1 July 1943, Rodenberg was transferred to RSHA Amt V, Kriminalpolizei (Kripo), as a speaker on issues of sexual psychology and also took the position of scientific director of the Reich Central Office for the Combating of Homosexuality and Abortion (Reichszentrale zur Bekämpfung der Homosexualität und der Abtreibung). The main job of Reichszentrale was recording and collecting data about homosexuals. Friedrich Panzinger described Rodenberg's other functions on 6 November 1944: evaluate "materials to continue the study of the problem of castration" in relation to "sex offenders, such as homosexuals, other moral criminals, pyromaniacs, and habitual offenders", to create the basis for implementing legislative and administrative measures.

Since 1941, Rodenberg had written of the castration of homosexuals in medical journals, which even earned him the recognition of SS chief Heinrich Himmler on 30 December 1942 for his "compelling articles". In 1941 Rodenberg stated in the journal Der öffentliche Gesundheitsdienst (Public Health Service) that a "desired pacification of the sexual life, but also in homosexuals, can often be achieved by castration, and only by castration." So far few homosexuals had offered "a sacrifice to the national community" and had been voluntarily castrated, which Rodenberg blamed on a "lack of sense of responsibility". Based on material collected while in the Kripo, in 1942 Rodenberg believed that he could demonstrate that castration was an appropriate measure "to remove criminal homosexual dynamics and at the same time help them", as stated in the journal Deutsche Justiz (German Justice). Rodenberg's material was referenced by more than 60% of cases of non-gay paedophiles. Rodenberg's efforts to pass a law for the castration of homosexuals before the end of the war were unsuccessful. In October 1942 he justified his proposal with the costs that resulted for the state for the support of homosexuals in Nazi concentration camps and preventative detention: "if they were castrated, they would be released soon, as most would not present a danger to the community, and they could also be reintegrated into society with the benefit of life". According to Rodenberg, Hitler as well would have attributed "great importance to the fight against evil".

=== Post-war ===
After the end of the war, Rodenberg lived in Wald-Michelbach. Because of his participation in the conference of 27 October 1942, the prosecution of Darmstadt and Berlin investigated him in the 1970s, but failed to prosecute. Speaking to the Central Office of the State Justice Administrations for the Investigation of National Socialist Crimes in 1986, Rodenberg denied his activities in the Reich Central Office for the Combating of Homosexuality and Abortion. He stated that studies on the therapeutic success of castration had been limited to moral crimes, not to homosexuals. Rodenberg's claim that he was indifferent to "the way in which homosexual adults appease their sexual desires freely amongst themselves" was contrary to Rodenberg's publications during the Nazi regime.

== Bibliography ==
- Burkhard Jellonek: Homosexuelle unter dem Hakenkreuz. Die Verfolgung von Homosexuellen im Dritten Reich. Schöningh, Paderborn 1990, ISBN 3-506-77482-4
