= Reich Central Office for the Combating of Homosexuality and Abortion =

Nazi Germany government bureau persecuting homosexuals

- Reichszentrale zur Bekämpfung der Homosexualität und der Abtreibung
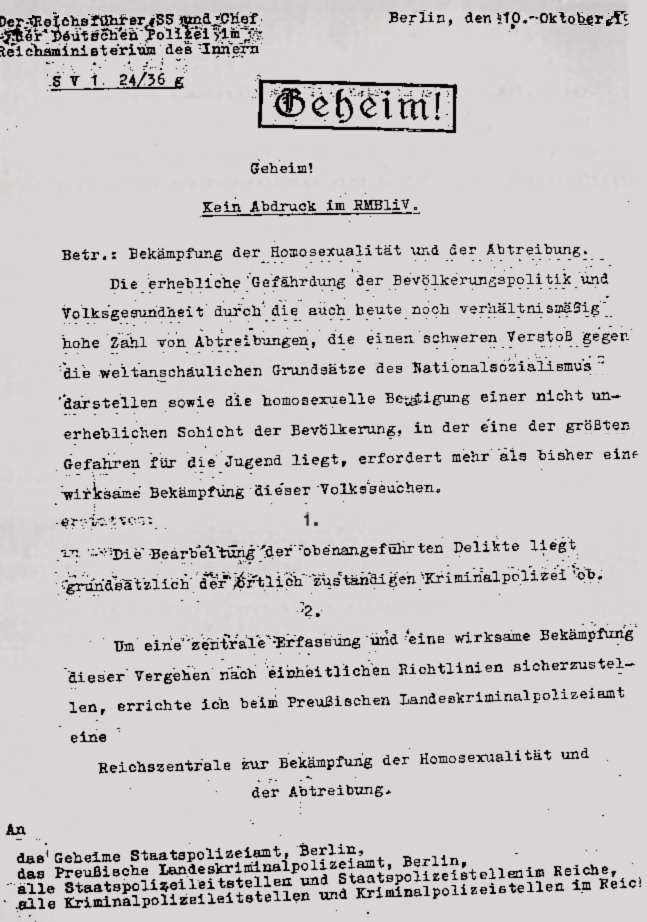
- Secret decree of the office's establishment

Central Office overview
- Formed: October 10, 1936
- Jurisdiction: Germany

The Reich Central Office for the Combating of Homosexuality and Abortion (German: Reichszentrale zur Bekämpfung der Homosexualität und der Abtreibung) was a government bureau central to Nazi Germany's persecution of homosexuals and tasked with enforcing laws which criminalized abortion.

== History ==
The Reich Central Office was created on 10 October 1936 by a special decree of the Reichsführer-SS Heinrich Himmler. Its creation signaled the revival of persecution of homosexuals during the relative calm after the 1936 Summer Olympics. The primary task of the Reich Central Office was the collection of data about homosexuals.

The centralized archive of data allowed the Reich Central Office to coordinate the persecution and punishment of homosexuals. To do this, it had at its disposal special mobile squads, which also could carry out executions. By 1940, the section had already possessed data on some 41,000 homosexuals, both suspected and convicted.

From 1936 to 1938 SS official Josef Meisinger was the director of the section at the Gestapo Central Headquarters. Later, it was led by criminologist advisor Erich Jacob. In July 1943, Jacob became director of criminology and began working alongside psychiatrist and neurologist Carl-Heinz Rodenberg, who came on as scientific director. A group of 17 workers was available to both of them. The office's collection of records on suspected and convicted homosexuals, which is believed to number about 100,000, was likely destroyed in the last days of the war.

In the Nazi regime's campaign against the Catholic Church, many Catholic priests were arrested on unfounded charges of homosexuality and acts of perversion. These "morality" prosecutions were suspended to show foreigners a good image during the 1936 Summer Olympics, but then resumed vigorously after Pope Pius XI had denounced Nazism in his 1937 encyclical Mit brennender Sorge. Clergy opposed to the regime or holding views the Nazis found suspect (for instance pacifism) were particularly targeted, with the false charge of homosexual conduct serving to conceal the real political cause of their prosecution. After having served their prison terms, many of those prosecuted were sent to concentration camps (usually the camp at Dachau, which had a special "priest block"). Owing to the especially brutal and inhumane living conditions prevalent in the camps, an indeterminate number of priests sent to concentration camps on concocted charges of homosexuality did not survive their confinement.

== See also ==
- LGBT history in Germany

== Bibliography ==
- Grau, Günter: Homosexualität in der NS-Zeit. Dokumente einer Diskriminierung und Verfolgung, Fischer, Frankfurt a.M. 2004, ISBN 359-61-59733.
- Hutter, Jörg: "Die Rolle der Polizei bei der Schwulen- und Lesbenverfolgung im Nationalsozialismus" .
