= Transvestite pass =

Certificate formerly used in Germany

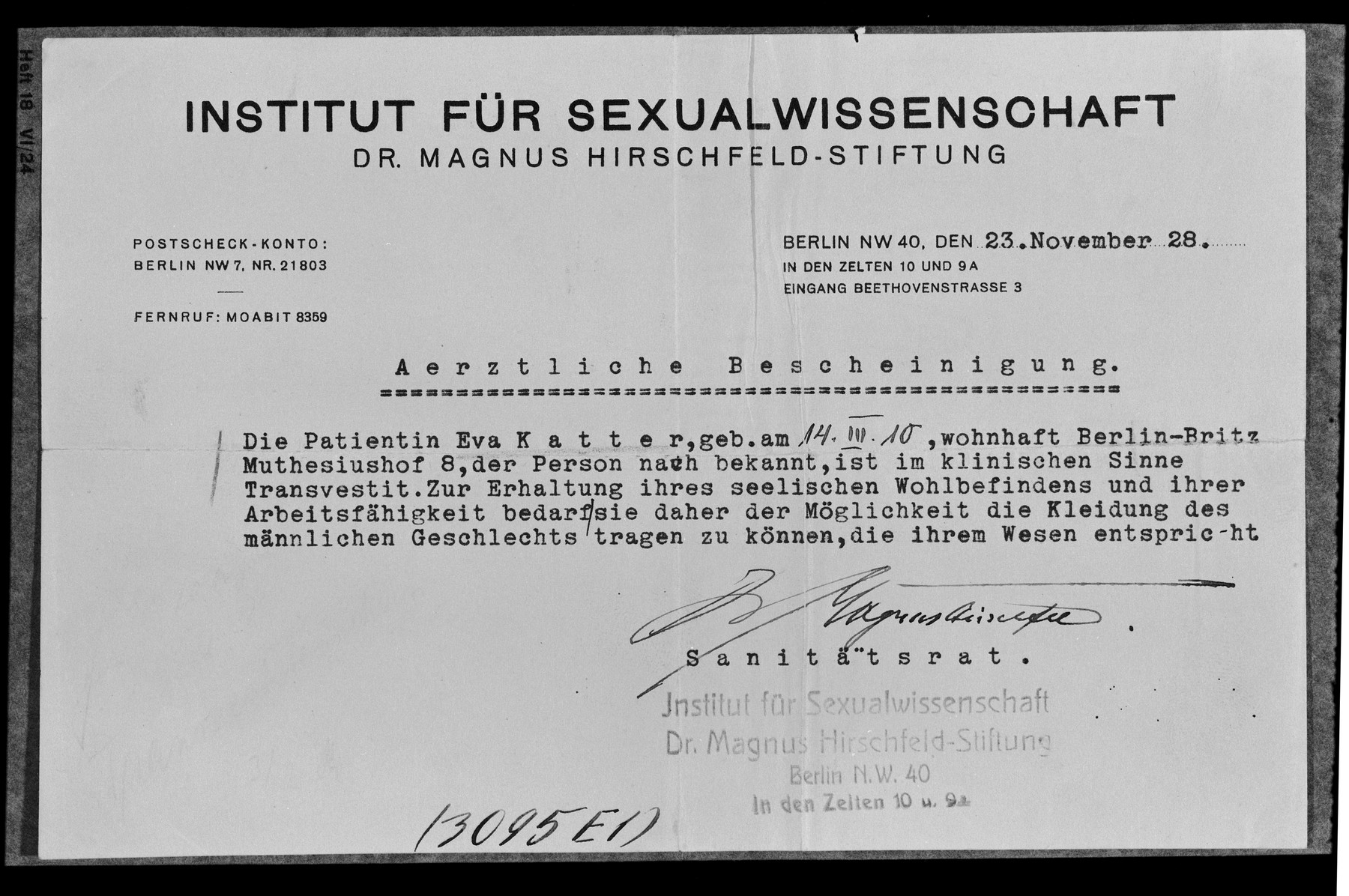
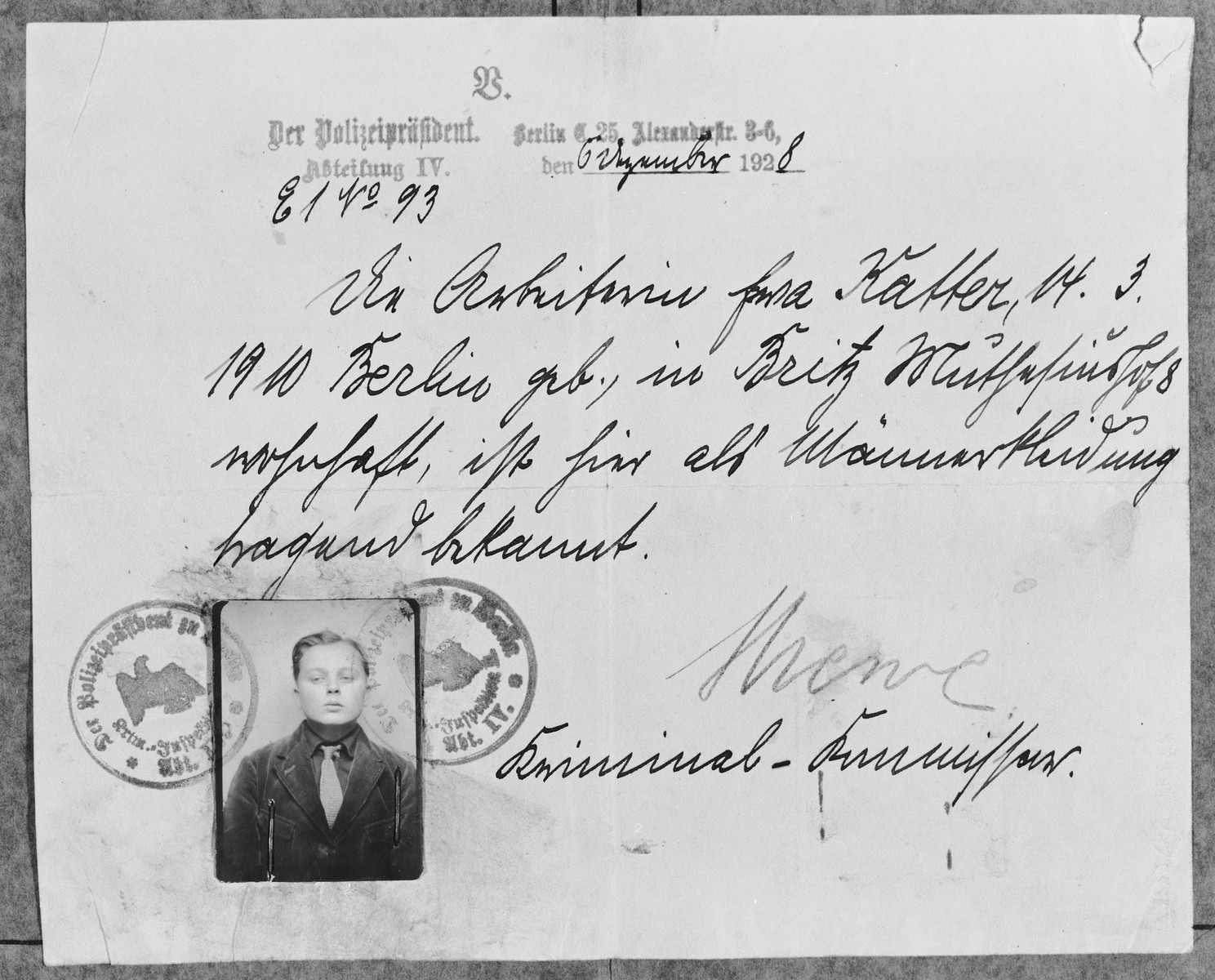
Tranvestite certificates issued to Gerd Katter in 1928. Pass without picture was issued by Magnus Hirschfeld's Institut für Sexualwissenschaft; pass with picture was issued by the Berlin Police.

A transvestite pass (German: Transvestitenschein) was a document issued by the police authority of Imperial Germany and the Weimar Republic, under the support of sexologist Magnus Hirschfeld, identifying a person as a transvestite. Transvestite at this time referred to all individuals whose gender identity or preferred clothing was discordant with that associated with their assigned sex, and so included both cross-dressing and transgender people. As gender-confirming surgery was only an emerging practice in the early 20th century, obtaining a Transvestitenschein, along with an official name change, represented the contemporary maximum extent to which many trans individuals could transition.

== History ==
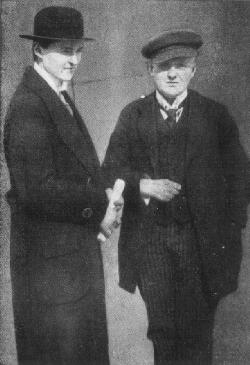
Herbert W. (left) was a transgender friend of Magnus Hirschfeld (not pictured) and lived for two years in Berlin under his chosen name. This photo is from Hirschfeld's Sexual Intermediates (1922).

In early 20th-century Germany, cross-dressing was not inherently illegal. However, those who defied societal gender norms through cross-dressing risked facing legal consequences, such as arrest and charges related to public outrage and disturbances. Magnus Hirschfeld played a pivotal role in assisting individuals navigate these challenging situations by helping them obtain police documents regarding their clothing choices to establish their "objective" sexual identity. Hirschfeld was the one who submitted reports to the police as evidence in support of obtaining a transvestite pass for his patients. Hirschfeld's efforts contributed to the transformation of this pass into a more specific permit that would be recognized on the basis of state legitimacy, particularly during the Weimar Republic.

In either 1908 or 1909, the first known transvestite pass was issued to a female-to-male transvestite known as Karl Kohnheim, who was denied a name change based on legality, but was helped with getting the pass itself. From 1908–1909 up until 1933, "perhaps dozens" of such transvestite passes were granted by the German police with the support and aid of Hirschfeld. Medical assessments were also conducted with the help of Iwan Bloch. These transvestite passes were mainly given to middle-class, heterosexual, male-to-female individuals to avoid associations with gay and lesbian culture in Weimar Germany. The transvestite pass certificate stated that the "individual in question" was allowed to wear clothing that corresponded to their gender identity, meaning they could cross-dress in public spaces.

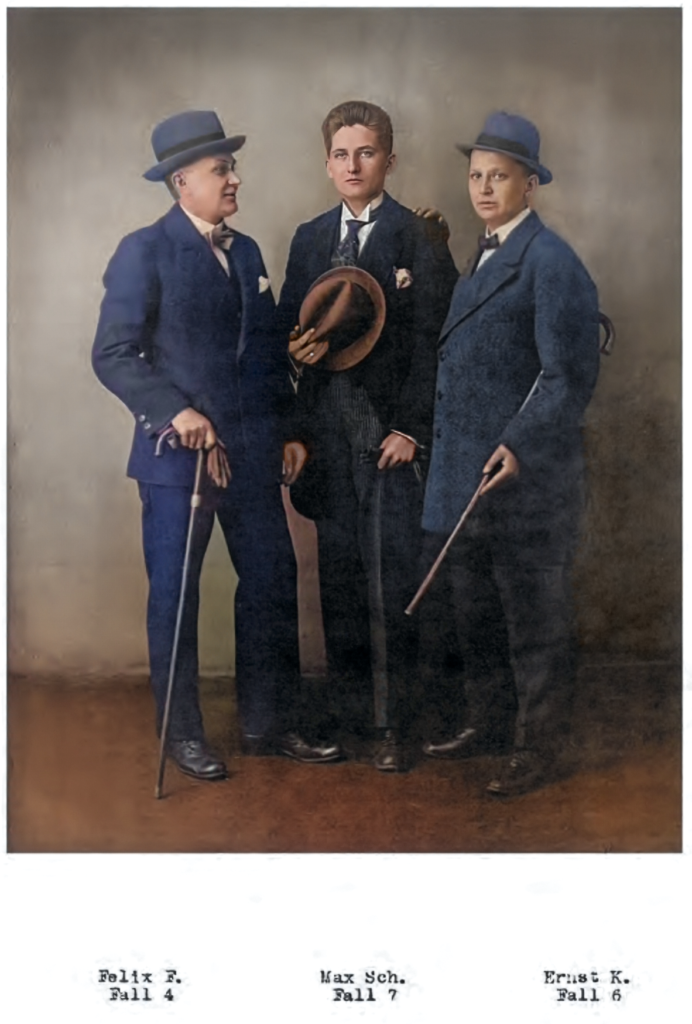
Photograph of Magnus Hirschfeld's 4th, 7th, and 6th patients, 1910.

Although passes were more widely distributed by the 1920s, name changes continued to be an issue. It was not until 1919 and 1920 that full name changes on birth certificates were possible, but there were still restrictions in place that limited free access to such changes.

Notions of transvestism were sufficiently novel in the early twentieth century that the case of one holder of a Transvestiteschein made international news. The case of Countess Geraldine von Zobeltitz, a trans noblewoman from Berlin, was reported in the 11 August 1912 issue of the Asheville Citizen-Times.

== Police ==
As the pass gained popularity, local police departments began issuing their own version of the transvestite pass. The police version was handwritten but had a photo of the individual wearing the clothes of their chosen sex. In order to get a pass, one would need a medical report from a medical professional and give it to the police, who will make the pass. In 1922, guidance issued by the police headquarters in Berlin regarding this policy stated:

Apart from male prostitution, transvestism in general has no criminal significance. The widespread public opinion that the disguised individuals are generally criminals in disguise (pickpockets, spies, pimps, etc.) is obsolete. With regard to the male transvestites, recent experience shows that even the formerly taken-for-granted view that men in women's clothing are all homosexuals is no longer tenable. . . . On the basis of this insight emerges a duty of gentle treatment [schonenden Behandlung] of transvestites, as long as they are not engaged in male prostitution.

In the years after the Nazis came to power, most of the transvestite passes were revoked or no longer recognized by German police forces and new applications were refused.

Since the certificates were issued by local police, some individuals encountered problems when they were traveling between police jurisdictions. Certain spaces also played a role in police involvement, such as presence on the street or at a ball, if police presence was requested on a certain basis. The streets or cafes were places that did not ensure freedom of movement and held different rules about gender presentation and behaviour; cross-dressing and gender experience were "misunderstood" by police in many cases, especially for lower-class individuals who were targeted more than their middle and upper-class counterparts.

Appearance played an important role in police actions. Cisgender men and women were also targets of the police if their appearance was not clearly masculine or feminine or caused confusion, resulting in arrests. Paula Huhn, a proletarian trans woman, was denied a transvestite pass in 1929, because the head of the Berlin police's "homosexual department" Bernhard Strewe thought she would not be able to pass as a woman in public.

== Magnus Hirschfeld ==
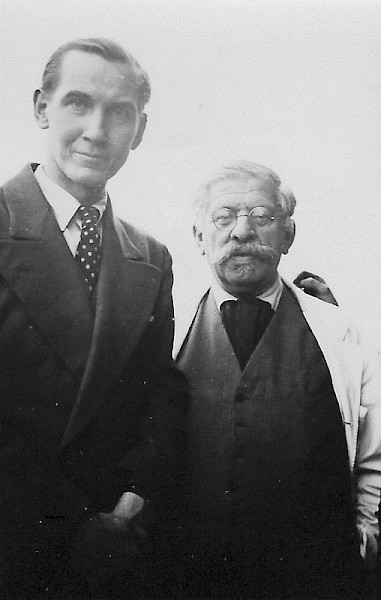
Magnus Hirschfeld (right) and Karl Giese (left), 1934.

=== Career ===
Magnus Hirschfeld (1868–1935) was a German physician, sexologist, clinician, and early homosexual rights activist. In 1919, in Berlin, Hirschfeld founded the Institut für Sexualwissenschaft (Institute for Sexual Science), a private sexology research institute. Along with his research institute, Hirschfeld strove for legal and social reform on the basis of LGBTQ+ rights, as he felt that individuals should not be characterized as abnormal and criminalized for being sexual minorities. Hirschfeld's theories and research would become theoretical precursors to concepts such as non-binary gender identity and same-sex love. Hirschfeld was a firm believer that science had the ability to provide fair treatment to all. This is echoed in his most famous motto, "per scientiam ad justitiam" ('through science to justice') In 1910, during the Weimar period, Hirschfeld coined the term "transvestism" to describe the act of cross-dressing. Hirschfeld did this as a way to distinguish the act of cross-dressing from notions of homosexuality as well as the gay and lesbian culture in Weimar Germany.

=== Transvestitenschein (transvestite pass) ===
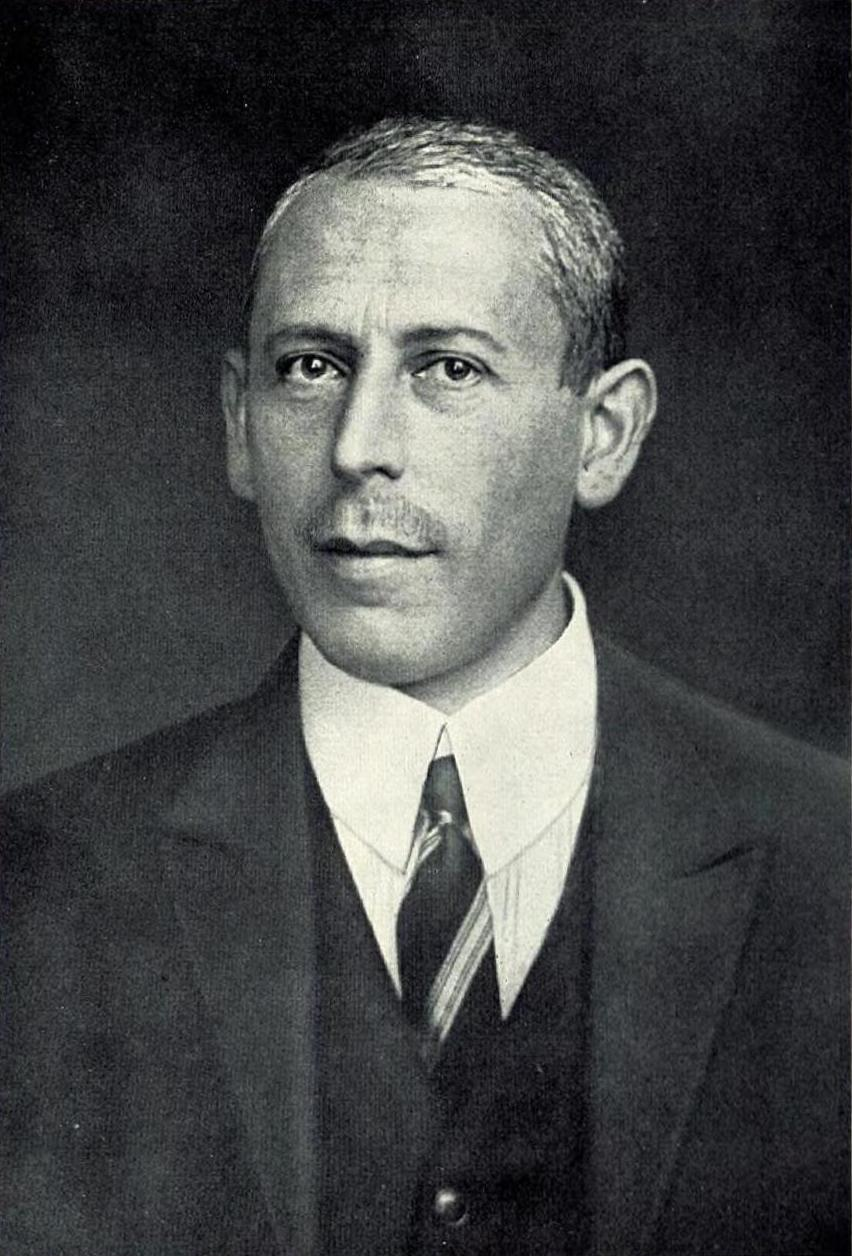
Karl Abraham, 1920

In 1908–1909, Hirschfeld and psychoanalyst Karl Abraham implemented the first Transvestitenschein (transvestite pass). Hirschfeld and Abraham created the transvestite pass as a form of protection for individuals against the arrest associated with the act of cross-dressing from local police authorities, as well as providing them with the ability to travel in an unimpeded manner. The implementation of the Transvestitenschein paved the way for further progression amongst transgender rights, such as the ability for legal name change. This was one of the first forms of trans recognition of state legitimacy. Along with the Transvestitenschein, Hirschfeld's institute, the Institut für Sexualwissenschaft, began offering other services for transgender individuals, such as sexual health services, including medical transitioning.

== Personal lives of individuals with the transvestite pass ==
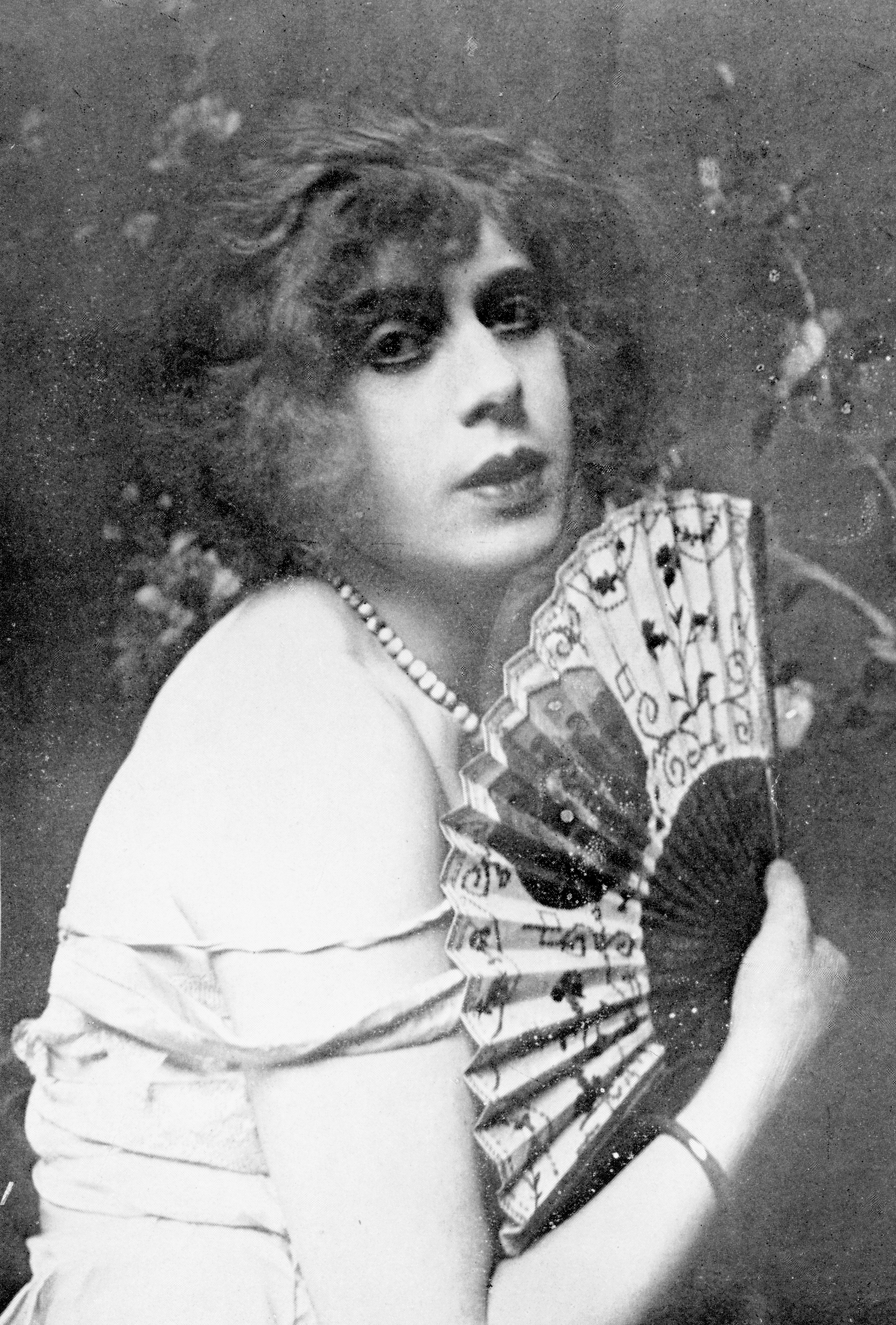
Lili Elbe, 1926

It is unknown how many people used Magnus Hirschfield's transvestite pass. Of the documented cases, most of them were given to white, middle-class transgender women. The media only described a bourgeois transgender experience rather than the multitude of transgender communities at the time in Weimar Germany. This influenced the lifestyles of many, as transgender patients were told to follow more middle-class values, such as not dressing too extravagantly or femininely, and not interacting with those who were outside the heterosexual norms, in order to conform to the regulations needed to obtain the transvestite pass. They were expected to follow these guidelines because police were told to only arrest individuals if they thought that they were committing "gross mischief" or prostitution. Many people who had transvestite passes had to distance themselves from the German LGBTQ+ community due to prejudice from both others in the transgender community as well as homophobia at that time.

While homosexuality and cross-dressing were not allowed, being transgender had no official legal consequences. For individuals who obtained the transvestite passes, there were not many reported cases where an individual transitioned from female to male (FTM). The vast majority of those in possession of the transvestite pass were individuals who transitioned from male to female (MTF). One of the only documented transgender men (female to male) of the time, Karl Kohnheim, passed the first examination in the process of approval for the transvestite pass but was eventually denied the right to change his name legally. It was more uncommon for transgender men to be given passes due to German society in the interwar period associating them with the queer community. Transgender women were given passes but also faced difficulties with changing their names. Not much information is documented about the personal lives of the individuals who obtained the transvestite pass. However, there were famous transgender people, such as Lili Elbe, who was able to successfully obtain a transvestite pass and was able to change her name legally. Nonetheless, the post-1933 fates of individuals who had received Hirschfeld's assistance varied significantly with the rise of the Nazi Regime. Thus, the transvestite pass illustrates the evolving legal and societal attitudes towards the act of cross-dressing, gender identity, and transgender rights in Weimar Germany.

== Post-Weimar period ==
When the Nazis came to power in 1933, German police stopped recognizing and providing passes. The police also revoked the passes of people who already had them, and in some instances, the pass was used to identify people to send to concentration camps. One example of this is Liddy Bacroff, who received a pass in 1928. After 1933, she had several encounters with the local police until they sent her to the Mauthausen concentration camp, where she died in 1943. Another example is that of Gerd Kubbe, whose pass was revoked in 1933, and in 1938, he was sent to a concentration camp; however, he was released a few months later. He was then granted to change his name, as other trans individuals (mostly trans men) had been allowed to do during the early years of the Nazi regime. In September 1939, Alex. S. petitioned the government to have his birth register changed from female to male. This was denied, and Alex ended up on a Nazi watchlist. This led to him losing his transvestite pass.

In the post-war era, the pass fell into obscurity but did see some use up until the late 1950s in places like West and East Berlin. These passes were issued by the police, and like in pre-Nazi Germany, they had a picture of the individual wearing the clothes of their chosen gender. However, these passes stopped being issued in the 1960s.

== See also ==
- First homosexual movement
- Gender recognition certificate
- Lili Elbe
- Transgender people in Nazi Germany
- Transgender rights in Germany (since 1980)
