= Gerd Katter =

German apprentice carpenter, insurance agent and patient (1910–1995)

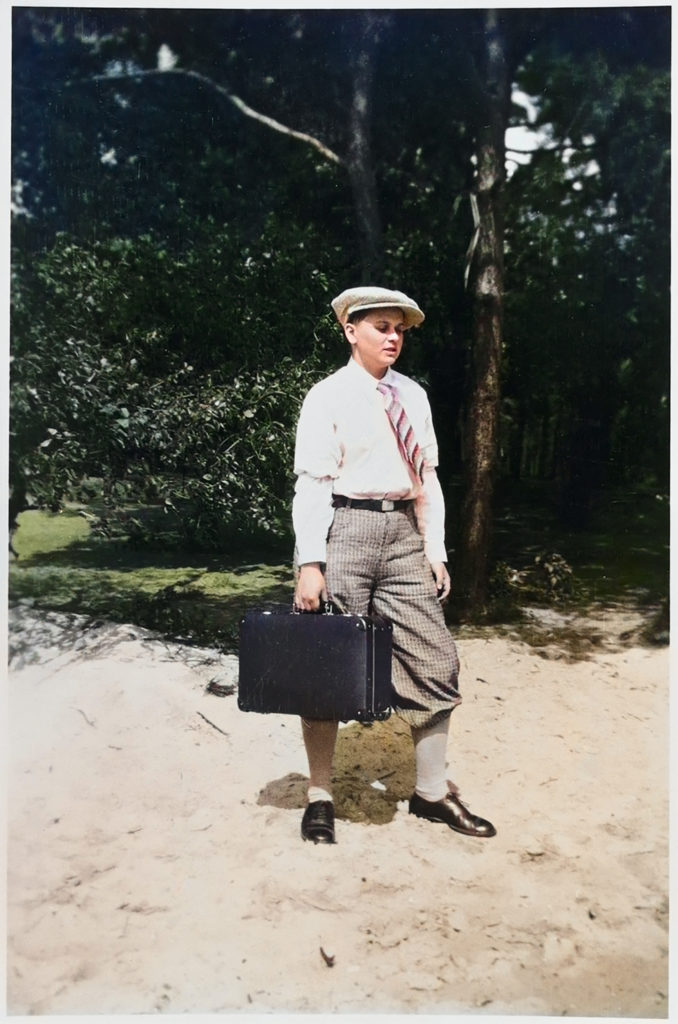
- Katter, c. 1929
- Born: 14 March 1910; Berlin, German Empire (now Germany)
- Died: 1995 (aged 84–85); Birkenwerder, Brandenburg, Germany
- Occupation: Apprentice Carpenter
- Known for: Patient of the German physician and sexologist, Magnus Hirschfeld

Gerd Katter (14 March 1910 – 1995) was a German apprentice carpenter, insurance agent and patient of the notable German physician and sexologist, Magnus Hirschfeld.

Katter is largely discussed in the context of his gender identity and status as a patient of Magnus Hirschfeld. Though he was assigned female at birth, Katter lived as a man, changing his name, pronouns and physical form to align with his sense of gender.

== Early life ==
Born on March 14, 1910, in Berlin-Britz, Gerd Katter disidentified with his assigned gender at birth. Through publications that described homosexuality and transvestism, such as those by sexual scientist Max Hodann, Das 3. Geschlecht by German activist and author Friedrich Radszuweit, and Magnus Hirschfeld's book Geschlechtskunde, Katter became aware of diverse iterations of sexuality and gender, which informed his own sense of identity. Katter was subsequently put in touch with Hirschfeld through an acquaintance of Hodann.

=== Surgery ===
In 1927, at age sixteen, Katter visited Magnus Hirschfeld's Institut für Sexualwissenschaft in Berlin with his mother, seeking gender affirming surgery in the form of a double mastectomy. The Institute, a research centre specializing in sexology, was known for providing medical and counselling services to its patients. Katter was turned away due to his young age, but returned to the Institute a few days later after having attempted the procedure by himself with a razor, though Katter does not mention this self-injury in his autobiographical account. In critical condition, Katter was treated accordingly by the Institute doctors, who completed the mastectomy.

=== Transvestitenschein ===
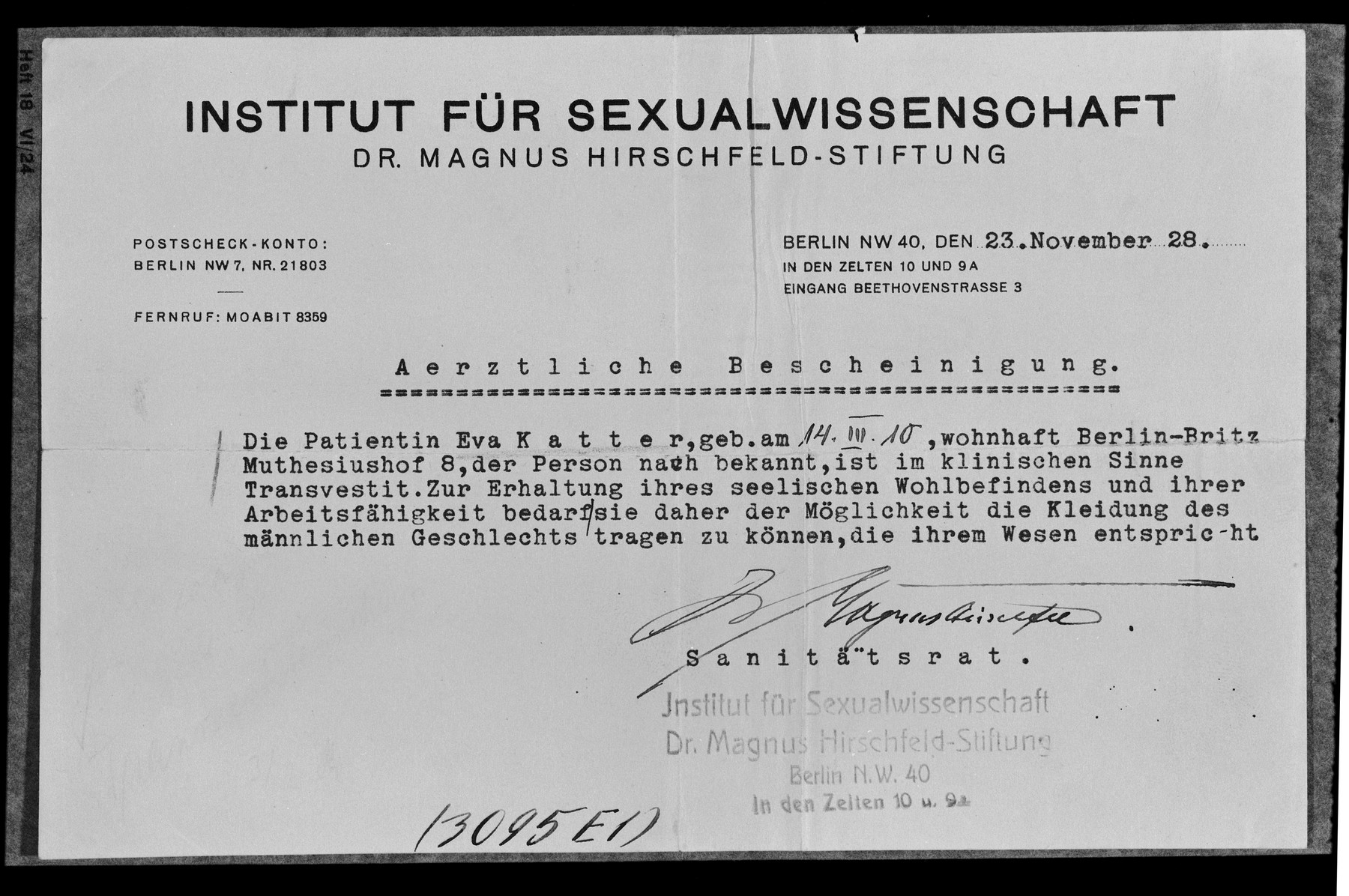
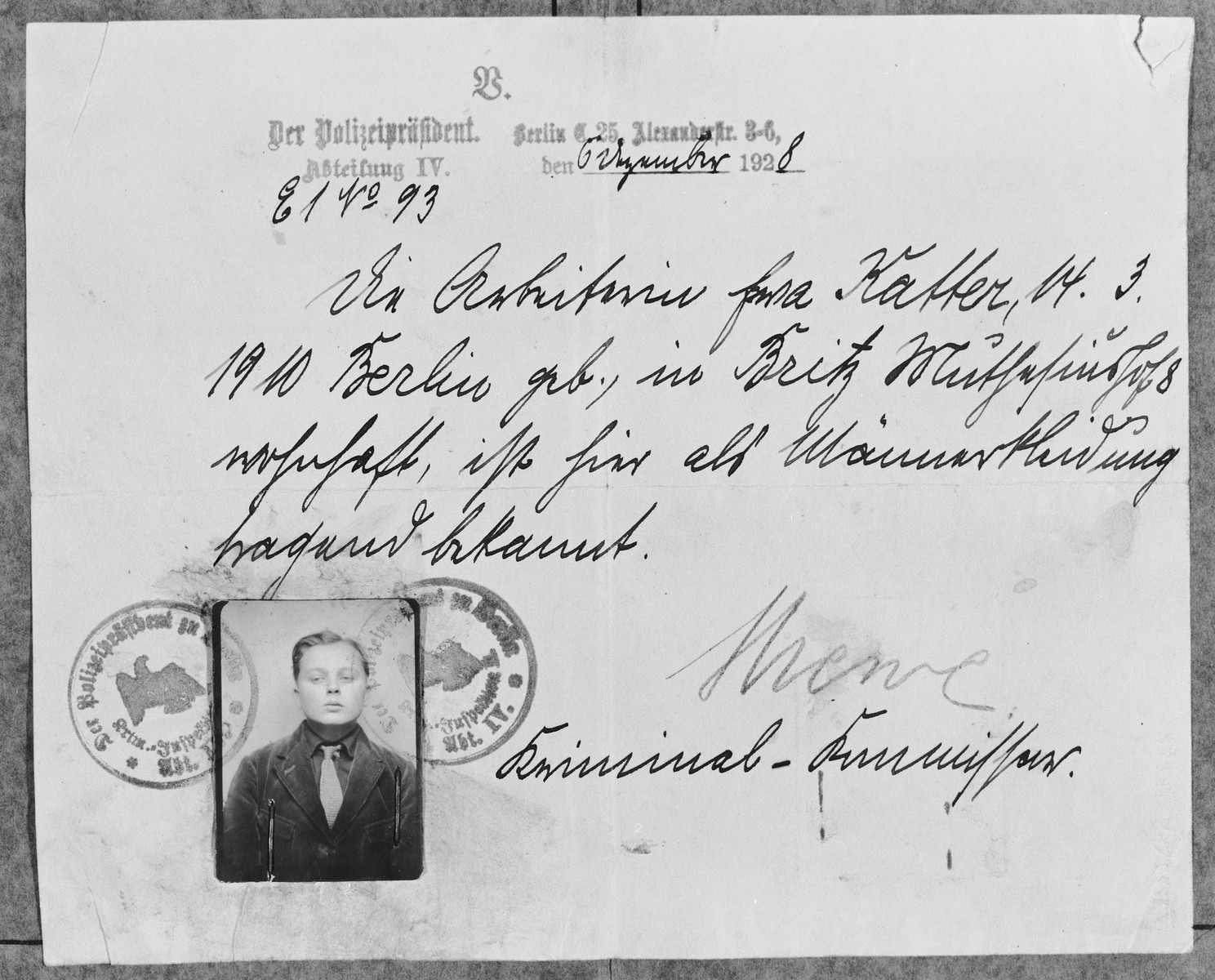
Transvestite certificates issued to Gerd Katter in 1928. Left was issued by Magnus Hirschfeld's Institut für Sexualwissenschaft; right was issued by the Berlin Police.

In 1928, at age eighteen, Katter sought further affirmation of his gender identity through acquiring a document known as a transvestite pass (German: Transvestitenschein). This document, issued by the governments of the German Empire and the Weimar Republic, identified its carrier as a transvestite, and allowed them to present in a way that may not have aligned with their assigned sex at birth. As described by historian Katie Sutton in her article, "Trans Rights and Cultures in the Weimar Republic," without these passes, and occasionally even with them, gender diverse individuals could be persecuted under Germany's “gross mischief” or “public nuisance” laws. Later in his life, while living in Brandenburg, East Germany, Katter contacted the Magnus Hirschfeld Society (German: Magnus-Hirschfeld-Gesellschaft) and donated his records. Katter's various transvestitenschein documents represent some of the few artifacts that scholars have access to today, and have been used to examine the role of identity documents in the fashioning of gender identity in Weimar Berlin.

As historian Annette F. Timm notes in her work, "'I am so grateful to all you men of medicine': Trans Circles of Knowledge and Intimacy," following his procedure and the acquisition of his transvestitenschein documents, Katter was touted by the Institute as a medical specimen and utilized as a "demonstration case" to visitors of the Institute. In scholar Elizabeth Andrea Rottman's dissertation, “Queer Home Berlin? Making Queer Selves and Spaces in the Divided City, 1945-1970," she recounts Katter's personal letters from the archives of the Magnus Hirschfeld Society, whose tone of fervent admiration for Hirschfeld and the Institute imply that he was happy to oblige.

== Later life ==
Katter went on to complete a carpenter's apprenticeship in Berlin, and later lived in Birkenwerder, a village in Brandenburg, East Germany, with his mother, where he worked for an insurance company and took acting lessons. Throughout his lifetime he maintained a personal allegiance to socialism and antifascism as a member of the Socialist Unity Party of Germany (German: Sozialistische Einheitspartei Deutschlands) and the Kulturbund.

=== Advocacy for Hirschfeld ===
In 1947, Anton Ackermann, the head of the cultural department of the SED, received a letter from Katter advocating for the commemoration of Magnus Hirschfeld and the reconstruction of the Institut für Sexualwissenschaft, which had been destroyed by the Nazi Party. As quoted by historian Elizabeth Andrea Rottman, in his letter to Ackermann, Katter described Hirschfeld as a "victim of fascism," but also a "gigantic fighter," using popular socialist language to identify Hirschfeld as a Victim of Fascism (German: Opfer des Faschismus), who were survivors officially recognized by the state. Though Katter's lamentation of Hirschfeld's unjust treatment and victimization under Nazi rule emphasized Hirschfeld's identity as a German, he made no mention of his Jewish identity, believing it would transmute the perception of Hirschfeld from an "active fighter" of fascism into a "passive victim."

Following this letter, Katter contacted friends of Hirschfeld and individuals with cultural influence who he felt may support his endeavour including the German Jewish writers, Friedrich Wolf and Arnold Zweig. In 1985, Katter learned of the Magnus Hirschfeld Society through a West Berlin radio program, and wrote to them, eventually donating his personal archive and recording interviews with the Society.

== Death ==
Gerd Katter died in the village of Birkenwerder in Brandenburg, Germany in 1995.
