= Transvestism =

Former medicalized framework describing gender nonconformity

Transvestism was a medicalized framework primarily used in the late nineteenth and early twentieth centuries to classify and explain varied forms of gender-variant expression and behavior. Coined by Magnus Hirschfeld in 1910, the term included a diverse range of phenomena that later came to be understood separately as cross-dressing, aspects of homosexuality, eonism, transsexuality, and transgender identity, but was not limited to any single one of these concepts.

During the mid-twentieth century, transvestism was classified as a psychiatric disorder in western diagnostic manuals. As medical and social understandings of gender variance and gender identity evolved, the term became increasingly outdated, stigmatized, and largely replaced by other terms. In its place, several more specific terms emerged, including the neutral, non-medicalized term cross-dressing for clothing choice behavior, alongside clinical terms such as transvestic fetishism which were retained for narrowly defined psychiatric diagnoses.

== Etymology and usage ==
=== Coinage ===
Magnus Hirschfeld coined the word transvestite (from Latin trans-, "across, over" and vestitus, "dressed") in his 1910 book Die Transvestiten (Transvestites) to refer to the sexual interest in cross-dressing. He used it to describe persons who habitually and voluntarily wore clothes of the opposite sex. Hirschfeld's group of transvestites consisted of both males and females, with heterosexual, homosexual, bisexual, and asexual orientations.

=== Usage ===
The term transvestite was historically used to diagnose medical disorders, including mental health disorders, and transvestism was viewed as a disorder, while the term cross-dresser was coined by the trans community.

In some cases, the term transvestite is seen as more appropriate for use by members of the trans community instead of by those outside the trans community, and some have reclaimed the word.

=== Related terms ===
The use of the term travesti meaning cross-dresser was already common in French in the early 19th century, from where it was imported into Portuguese, with the same meaning.

=== Pejorative ===
Today, the term transvestite is commonly considered outdated and derogatory, with the term cross-dresser used as a more appropriate replacement.

=== Meanings and definitions ===
The second half of the 20th century saw a multiplicity of terms and meanings applied to tranvestism as well as the coinage of related terms, many of which did not survive, or whose meanings evolved. In the most general sense, the wearing of clothing primarily associated with another sex is known as "cross-dressing", whereas transvestism is or was generally the term that describes obtaining of erotic arousal from cross-dressing.

Moser gives this definition in 2002:

The act of wearing the stereotypic articles of clothing of the other sex is known as crossdressing. Obtaining erotic enjoyment from the process of cross-dressing is known as transvestism.

— Charles Allen Moser, "Transvestic fetishism: Psychopathology or iatrogenic artifact?"

== History ==
=== Precursors ===
The phenomenon of wearing clothing typical of the other sex was referred to in the Hebrew Bible.

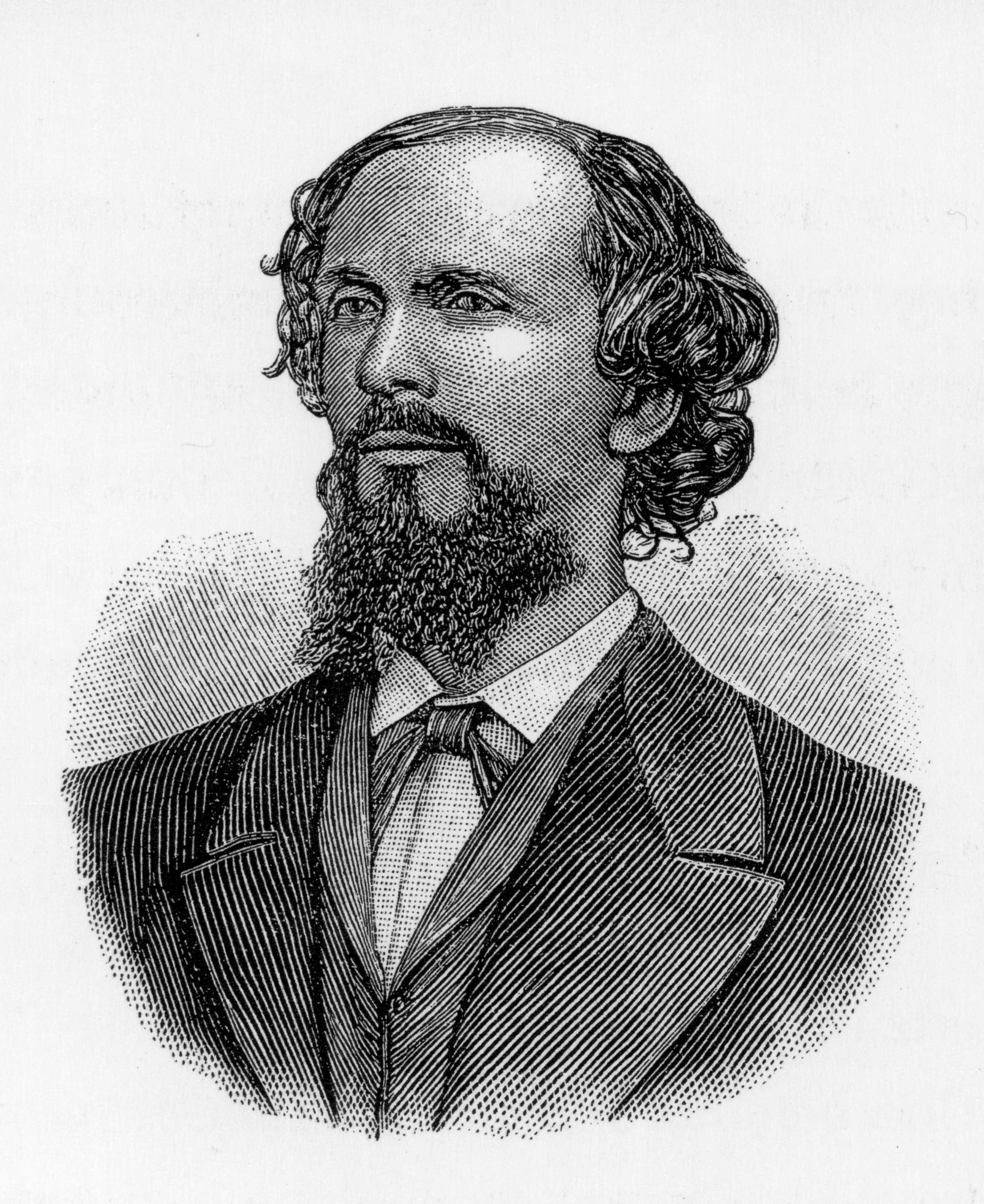
Karl Heinrich Ulrichs

Karl Heinrich Ulrichs was a German lawyer and pioneer of sexology and gay rights. In 1862, he came out to friends and family that he was gay, coining the German term Urning to describe himself (English: Uranian). (Note: The first known appearance of homosexual in print is found in an 1868 letter to Karl Heinrich Ulrichs by the Austrian-born novelist Karl-Maria Kertbeny arguing against a Prussian anti-sodomy law.) Ulrichs coined various terms to describe different sexual orientations, including Urning for a man who desires men (English "Uranian"), and Dioning for one who desires women. Ulrichs published urning pamphlets under his own name as an apologist for the cause, and is thus unique at that time and for some time thereafter. In 1868, the Austrian writer Karl-Maria Kertbeny coined the word homosexual in a letter to Ulrichs, and from the 1870s the subject of sexual orientation (in modern terms) began to be widely discussed.

Karl Westphal quoted Ulrichs's writings in the first psychiatric paper on 'contrary sexual feeling' and largely used Ulrichs's theoretical framework. Ulrichs also corresponded for many years with psychiatrist Richard von Krafft-Ebing, who later acknowledged his debt to Ulrichs, stating that it was "only the knowledge of your books which motivated me to study this highly important area".

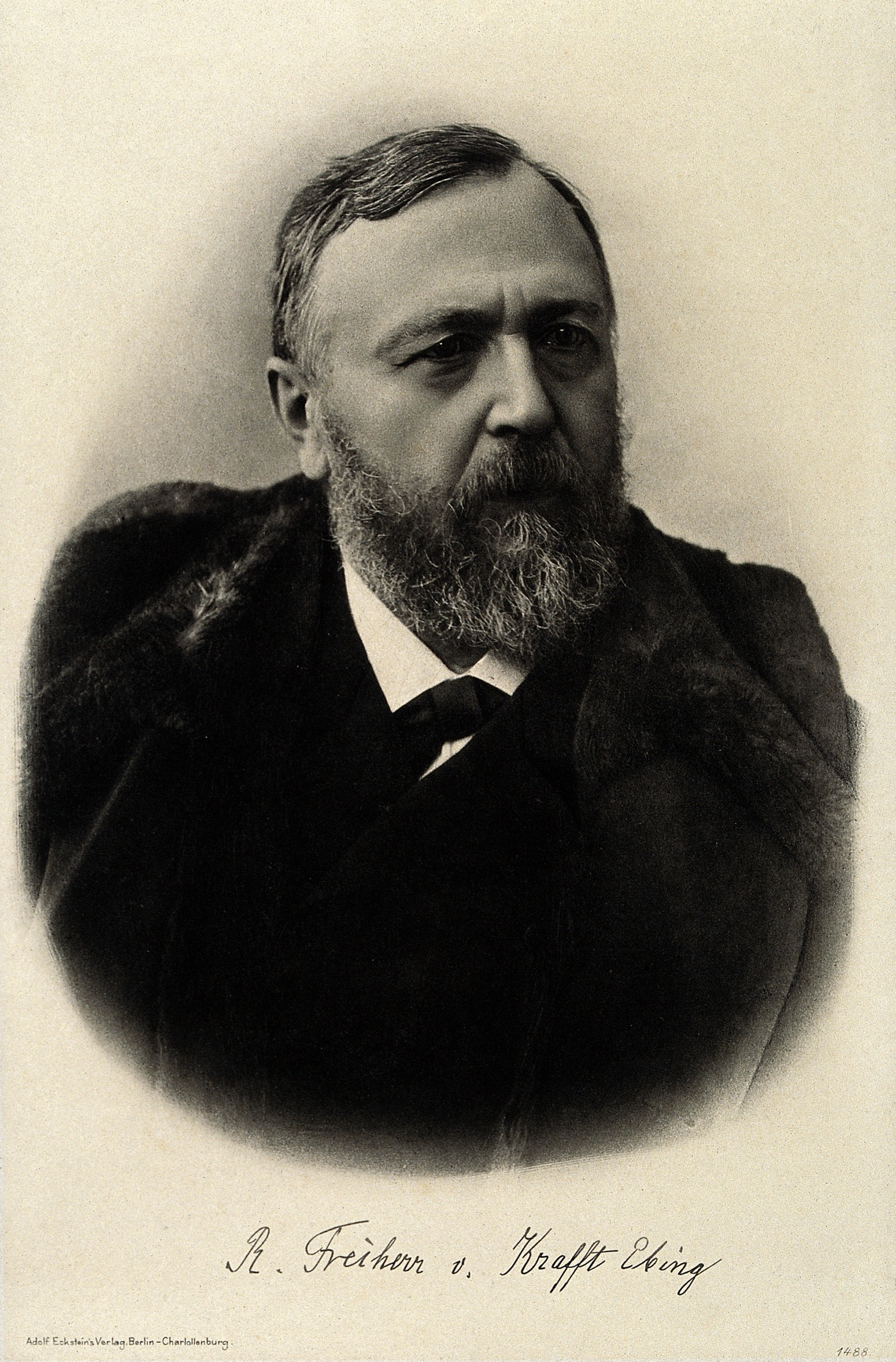
Richard von Krafft-Ebing

Richard von Krafft-Ebing was a German psychiatrist and author of the foundational work Psychopathia Sexualis (1886). Krafft-Ebing had particular significance for the scientific study of homosexuality. Karl Heinrich Ulrichs' theory of the "Urning" (Uranian) as a third sex greatly influenced Krafft-Ebing's thinking on the subject. Being part of the homosexual movement of Weimar Germany in the beginning, a first transvestite movement of its own started to form since the mid-1920s, resulting in founding first organizations and the first transvestite magazine, Das 3. Geschlecht ('The Third Sex'). The rise of National Socialism stopped this movement from 1933 onwards.

=== Magnus Hirschfeld ===
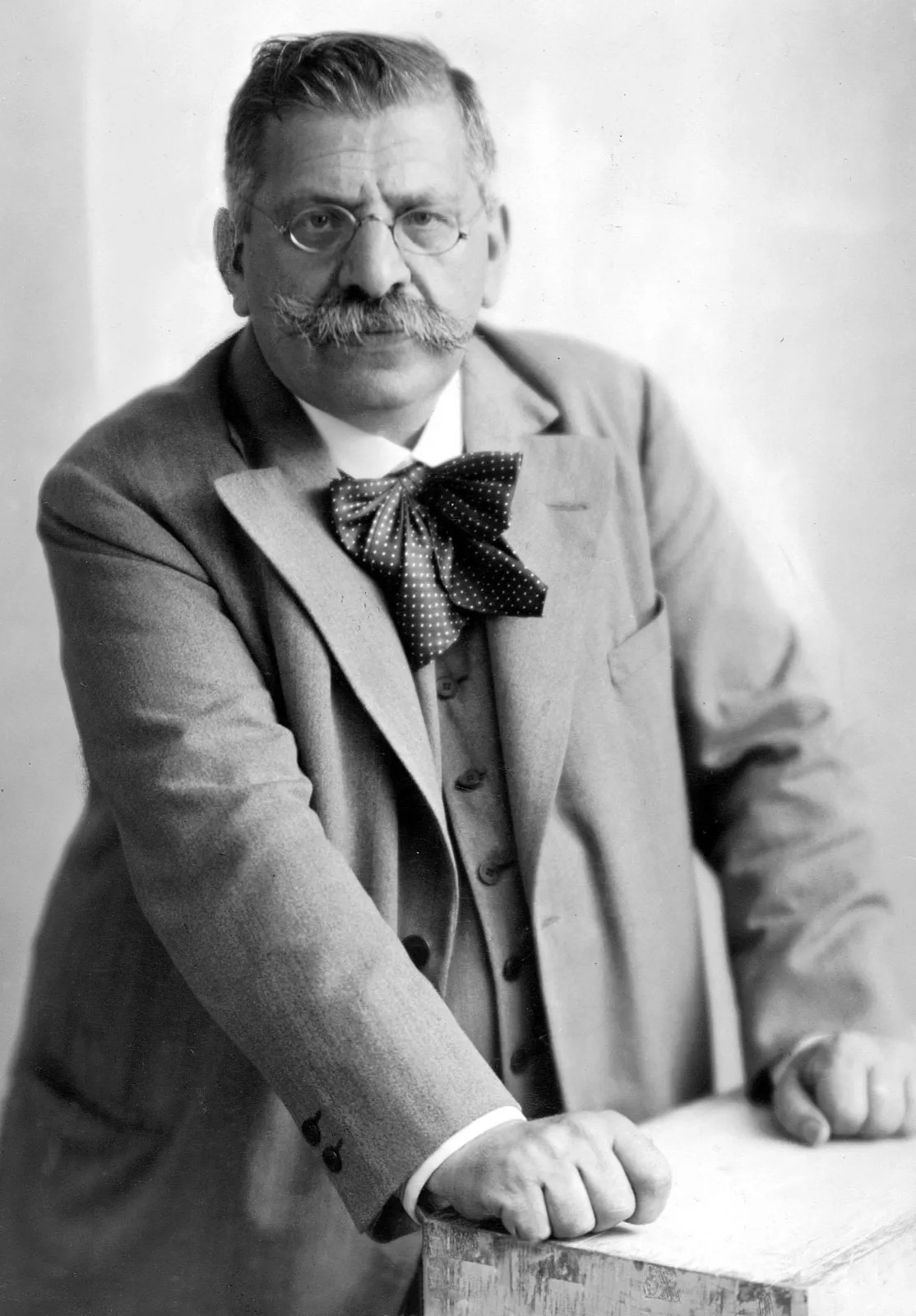
Magnus Hirschfeld in 1928

Hirschfeld believed that clothing was only an outward symbol chosen on the basis of various internal psychological situations. In fact, Hirschfeld helped people to achieve changes of their first name (legal given names were required to be gender-specific in Germany) and performed the first reported sexual reassignment surgery. Hirschfeld's transvestites therefore were, in today's terms, not only transvestites, but a variety of people from the transgender spectrum.

Hirschfeld also noticed that sexual arousal was often associated with transvestism. In more recent terminology, this is sometimes called transvestic fetishism. Hirschfeld also clearly distinguished between transvestism as an expression of a person's "contra-sexual" (transgender) feelings and fetishistic behavior, even if the latter involved wearing clothes of the other sex.

=== Ellis and Eonism ===
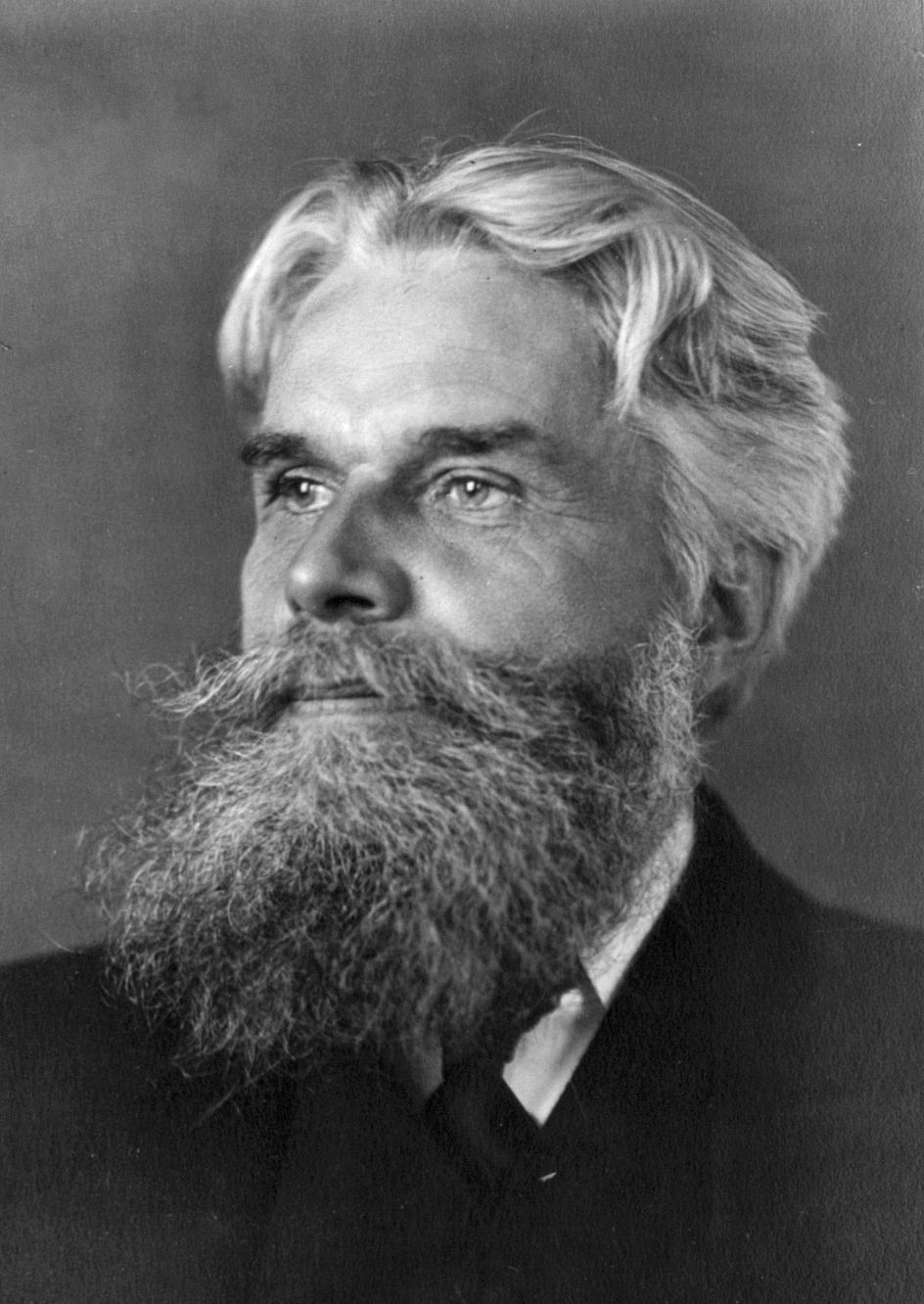
Ellis in 1913

Havelock Ellis studied what today are called transgender phenomena. Together with Magnus Hirschfeld, Havelock Ellis is considered a major figure in the history of sexology to establish a new category that was separate and distinct from homosexuality. Aware of Hirschfeld's studies of transvestism but disagreeing with his terminology, in 1913 Ellis proposed the term sexo-aesthetic inversion to describe the phenomenon. In 1920 he coined the term eonism, which he derived from the name of a historical figure, the Chevalier d'Éon.

Writing to sexologist Norman Haire in 1925 while writing his book on Eonism (Note: Eonism and Other Supplementary Studies, 1928), Ellis wrote:

Just now I am getting my study on transvestism into shape. (I call it Eonism, after Chevalier d'Eon, as I do not agree that cross-dressing is always the most essential feature.)

— Havelock Ellis, letter to Haire, 5 March 1925, quoted in Crozier (2000)

=== Mid-20th century psychiatry ===
Mid-20th century psychiatry saw the introduction of key terms in sexology like transexualism, gender role, and gender identity.

David Oliver Cauldwell introduced the term transexualism to an English-speaking audience in 1949.

John Money coined gender role in 1955, and Robert J. Stoller introduced gender identity in 1964. During this period, the term transvestism was generally used in medical contexts to describe a disorder and not merely a behavior, and was considered deviant behavior found predominantly among homosexuals.

=== Virginia Prince ===
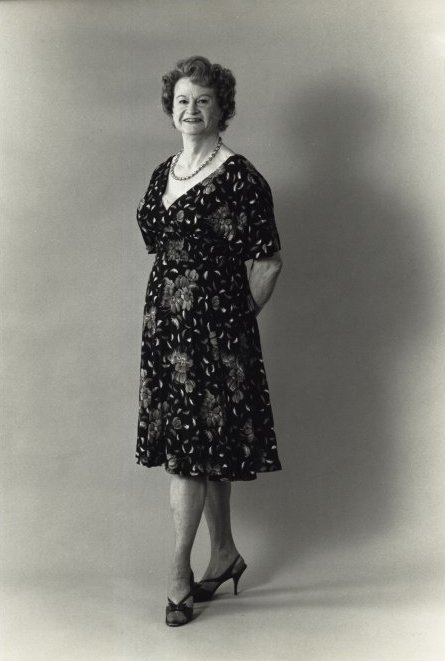
Virginia Prince

Virginia Prince was an American transgender woman and transgender activist. She published Transvestia magazine from 1960 to 1980, and founded Tri-Ess for male heterosexual cross-dressers.

Prince has been considered a major pioneer of the transgender community. Her long history of literature surrounding issues of crossdressing and transvestism was rooted in her desire to fight against those who disagreed with liberal sexual ideology.

By the early 1970s, Prince and her approaches to crossdressing and transvestism were starting to gain criticism from transvestites and transsexuals, as well as sections of the gay and women's movements of the time. Controversy and criticism has arisen based on Prince's support for conventional societal norms, such as marriage and the traditional family model, as well as the portrayal of traditional gender stereotypes. Her attempts to exclude transsexuals, homosexuals, or fetishists from her normalization efforts of the practice of transvestism have also drawn much criticism.

In other works, Prince also helped popularize the term 'transgender', and erroneously asserted that she coined "transgenderist" and "transgenderism", words which she meant to be understood as describing people who live as full-time women, but have no intention of having genital surgery. Prince also consistently argued that transvestism is very firmly related to gender, as opposed to sex or sexuality. Her use of the term "femmiphile" related to the belief that the term "transvestite" had been corrupted, intending to underline the distinction between heterosexual crossdressers, who act because of their love of the feminine, and the homosexuals or transsexuals who may cross-dress. Although Prince identified with the concept of androgyny (stating in her autobiographical 100th issue that she could "do [her] own thing whichever it is"), she preferred to identify as Gynandrous. This, she explained, is because although 'Charles' still resides within her, "the feminine is more important than the masculine." Prince's idea of a "true transvestite" was clearly distinguished from both the homosexual and the transsexual, claiming that true transvestites are "exclusively heterosexual... The transvestite values his male organs, enjoys using them and does not desire them removed."

=== Harry Benjamin ===
Harry Benjamin was a German-American endocrinologist and sexologist, widely known for his clinical work with transgender people.

Prior to arriving in the United States in 1914, Benjamin studied at Hirschfeld's Institut für Sexualwissenschaft in Berlin. From about this time onward he began to encounter and treat patients who he would later describe as transsexuals. In the 1930s he studied in Austria with Eugen Steinach. In 1948, in San Francisco, Benjamin was asked by Alfred Kinsey, a fellow sexologist, to see a young patient who was anatomically male but insisted on being female. Kinsey had encountered the child as a result of his interviews for Sexual Behavior in the Human Male, which was published that year. This case rapidly caused Benjamin's interest in what he would come to call transsexualism realizing that there was a different condition to that of transvestism, under which adults who had such needs had been classified to that time.

== As a disorder ==
The International Statistical Classification of Diseases and Related Health Problems (ICD) listed dual-role transvestism (non-sexual cross-dressing) and fetishistic transvestism (cross-dressing for sexual pleasure) as disorders in ICD-10 (1994). Both items were removed for ICD-11 (2022).

When cross-dressing occurs for erotic purposes over a period of at least six months and also causes significant distress or impairment, the behavior is considered a mental disorder in the United States Diagnostic and Statistical Manual of Mental Disorders, and the psychiatric diagnosis "transvestic fetishism" is applied.

== Transvestite pass ==
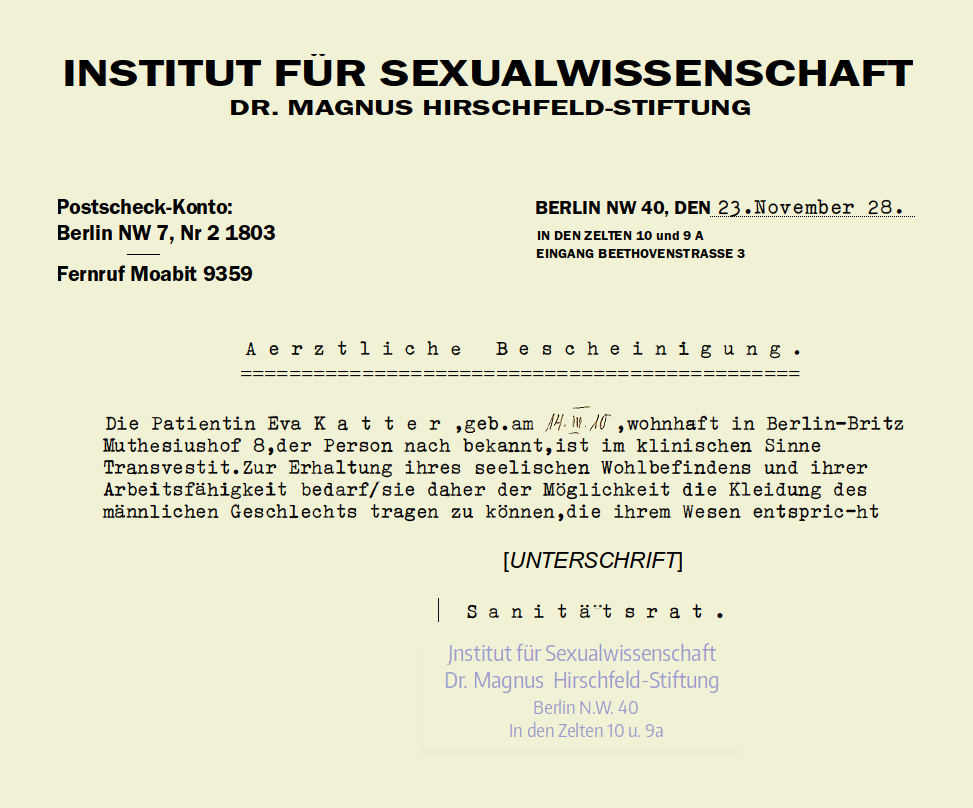
A 1928 transvestite pass allowing Gert Katter, a female-to-male transvestite who was one of Hirschfeld's patients, to wear male clothing.

In early 20th-century Germany, cross-dressing was not illegal per se, but there were risks with legal consequences, such as arrest for public outrage and disturbances. Magnus Hirschfeld played a pivotal role in assisting individuals mitigate the risks by helping them obtain a transvestite pass (Transvestitenschein) from the police regarding their clothing choices. Hirschfeld's efforts contributed to the transformation and legitimization of this pass into a state-recognized permit, particularly during the Weimar Republic.

As gender-affirming surgery was only an emerging practice at the time, obtaining a transvestite pass along with an official name change represented the maximum extent to which many trans individuals could transition.

== See also ==
- Cross-dressing
- Drag (clothing)
- Feminization (activity)
- Gender bender
- List of transgender-related topics
- Transsexual
