= Laurie Marhoefer =

Professor of German history

Laurie Marhoefer is a historian of queer and trans politics who is employed as the Jon Bridgman Endowed Professor of History at the University of Washington. In January 2021, together with Jennifer V. Evans, they facilitated the Jack and Anita Hess Research Seminar at the United States Holocaust Memorial Museum on LGBTQ+ histories of the Holocaust.

== Works ==
- Marhoefer, Laurie (2015). Sex and the Weimar Republic: German Homosexual Emancipation and the Rise of the Nazis. University of Toronto Press. ISBN 978-1-4426-1957-9.
- Marhoefer, Laurie (2022). Racism and the Making of Gay Rights: A Sexologist, His Student, and the Empire of Queer Love. University of Toronto Press. ISBN 978-1-4875-0581-3.
