= History of lesbianism =

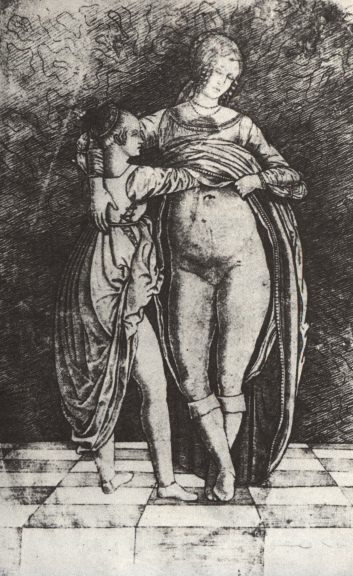
Woman and Her Maid by Giovanni Antonio da Brescia, 1500.

Lesbianism is sexual and romantic desire or relationships between women. Women have typically been underrepresented in history as both writers and subjects, and lesbianism has been correspondingly under-recorded. Since the 1970s, efforts have been made to gather together and preserve lesbian history.

== The study of lesbian history ==
There has been extensive debate as to what qualifies a historic relationship as "lesbian." In 1989, an academic cohort called the Lesbian History Group wrote:

Because of society's reluctance to admit that lesbians exist, a high degree of certainty is expected before historians or biographers are allowed to use the label. Evidence that would suffice in any other situation is inadequate here... A woman who never married, who lived with another woman, whose friends were mostly women, or who moved in known lesbian or mixed gay circles, may well have been a lesbian. ... But this sort of evidence is not 'proof'. What our critics want is incontrovertible evidence of sexual activity between women. This is almost impossible to find.

Female sexuality is often not adequately represented in historical texts and documents. Until very recently, much of what has been documented about women's sexuality has been written by men, in the context of male understanding, and relevant to women's associations to men—as their wives, daughters, or mothers, for example.

== Africa ==
Cross-gender roles and marriage between women have been recorded in over 30 traditional African societies. Women may marry other women, raise their children, and be thought of as men in societies in Nigeria, Cameroon, and Kenya. The Hausa people of Sudan have a term equivalent to lesbian, kifi, that may also be applied to males to mean "neither party insists on a particular sexual role."

Near the Congo River, a female who participates in strong emotional or sexual relationships with another female among the Nkundo people is known as yaikya bonsángo (a woman who presses against another woman). Lesbian relationships are also known in matrilineal societies in Ghana among the Akan people.

In Lesotho, women engage in what is commonly considered sexual behavior to the Western world: they kiss, sleep together, rub genitals, participate in cunnilingus, and maintain their relationships with other females vigilantly. Since the people of Lesotho believe sex requires a penis, they do not consider their behavior sexual, nor label themselves lesbians.

In Tanzania, lesbians are known as msagaji (singular) or wasagaji (plural), meaning grinder or grinding in Swahili, because of the perceived nature of lesbian sex involving the mutual rubbing of vulvas.

Founded in 2004 in Namibia, the Coalition of African Lesbians is a pan-Africanist, radical feminist network of fourteen nonprofits across ten African countries, working to eradicate stigma, legal discrimination, and violence against lesbians.

=== Egypt ===
==== Ancient Egypt ====
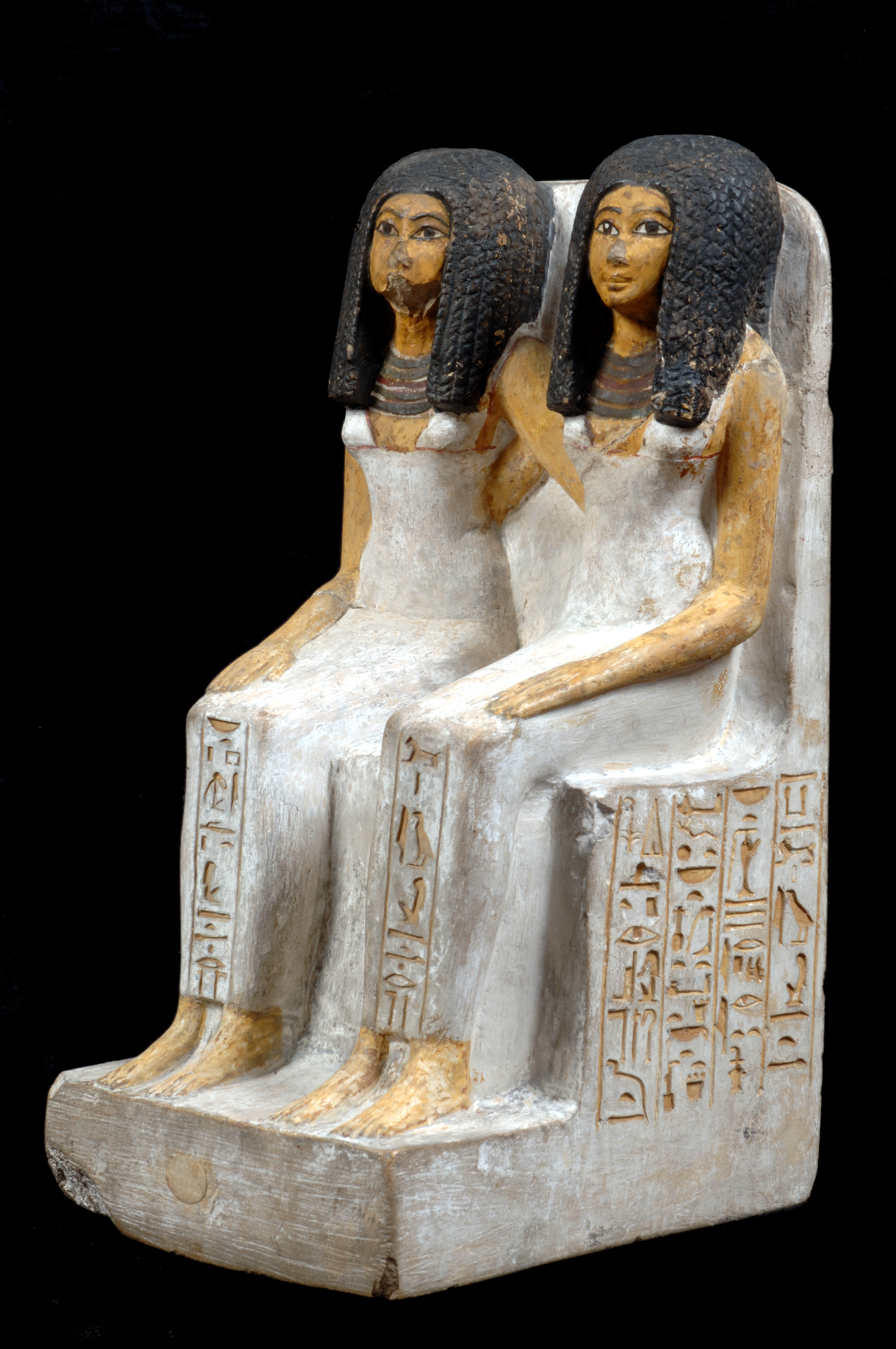
Statue of two ancient Egyptian women, Idet and Ruiu, depicted in a form typical of married couples, Museo Egizio.

The Dream Book of the Carlsberg papyrus XIII claims that "If a woman dreams that a woman has intercourse with her, she will come to a bad end". Depictions of women during the New Kingdom suggest they enjoyed, in a relaxed and intimate atmosphere, the company of other women who were scantily clad or naked. Some cosmetics-related items, which may have been owned and used by women, feature nude and suggestive depictions of women.

In the fifth century CE, women at the White Monastery in Upper Egypt sometimes pursued same-sex relationships. A letter from Shenoute chastises two women, ⲧⲁⲏⲥⲉ (Taêse) and ⲧⲥⲁⲛⲥⲛⲱ (Tsansnô), for running after each other "in friendship and physical desire." This phrase referred to homosexual advances. It is unknown if the corporal punishment Shenoute prescribed for the women was administered.

==== Medieval Egypt ====
Between 1170 and 1180, Maimonides, one of the foremost rabbis in Jewish history, compiled his magnum opus, the Mishneh Torah. It is the only Medieval-era work that details all of Jewish observance, and regarding lesbianism it states:

For women to be mesollelot [women rubbing genitals against each other] with one another is forbidden, as this is the practice of Egypt, which we were warned against: "Like the practice of the land of Egypt ... you shall not do" (Leviticus 18:3). The Sages said [in the midrash of Sifra Aharei Mot 8:8–9], "What did they do? A man married a man, and a woman married a woman, and a woman married two men." Even though this practice is forbidden, one is not lashed [as for a Torah prohibition] on account of it, since there is no specific prohibition against it, and there is no real intercourse. Therefore, [one who does this] is not forbidden to the priesthood because of harlotry, and a woman is not prohibited to her husband by this, since it is not harlotry. But it is appropriate to administer to them lashings of rebellion [i.e., those given for violation of rabbinic prohibitions], since they did something forbidden. And a man should be strict with his wife in this matter, and should prevent women known to do this from coming to her or from her going to them.

==== Modern Egypt ====
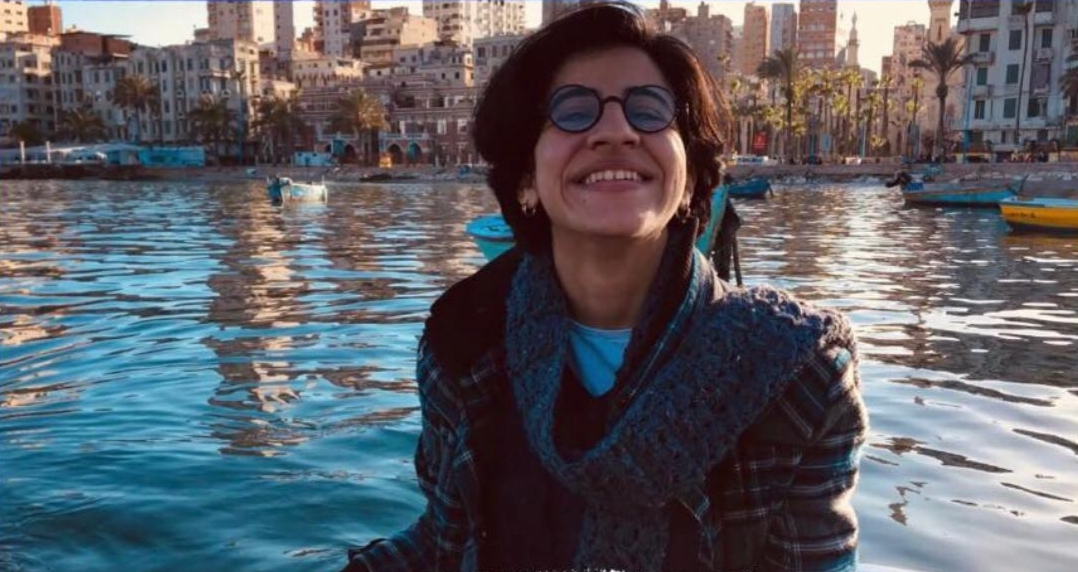
Sarah Hegazi, an Egyptian arrested in 2017 for flying a rainbow flag

Modern Egyptians have faced increasingly repressive strictures on sexuality. In 2017, the Egyptian government arrested and tortured out lesbian and activist Sarah Hegazi after she flew a rainbow flag at a concert.

=== South Africa ===
Corrective rape, the practice of men raping lesbians with a goal of punishment of "abnormal" behavior and reinforcement of societal norms, is reported to be on the rise in South Africa. The crime is sometimes supervised by members of the woman's family or local community, and is a major contributor to HIV infection in South African lesbians. According to research by the Triangle Project in 2008, at least 500 lesbians become victims of corrective rape every year (nonprofit Luleki Sizwe puts the figure at 3600) and 86% of black lesbians in the Western Cape live in fear of being sexually assaulted. Luleki Sizwe further estimates that more than 10 lesbians are raped or gang-raped on a weekly basis. Victims are less likely to report the crime because of their society's homophobia.

Corrective rape is not recognized by the South African legal system as a hate crime, despite the fact that the South African Constitution states that no person shall be discriminated against based on their social status and identity, including sexual orientation. Legally, South Africa protects gay rights extensively, but the government has not taken proactive action to prevent corrective rape, and women have little faith in the police and their investigations.

== Ancient Roman Empire ==
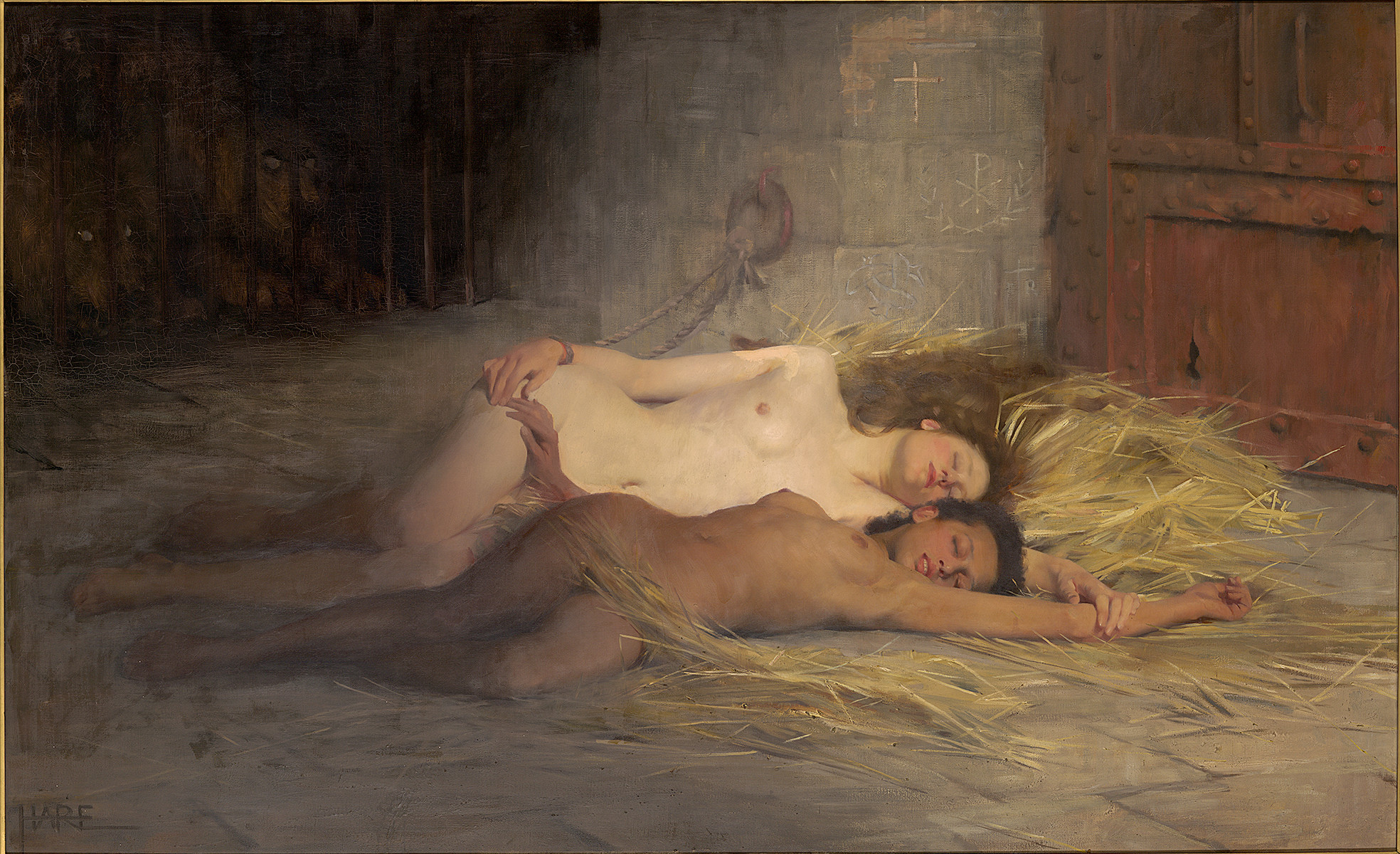
The Victory of Faith by Saint George Hare has been described by Kobena Mercer as depicting an interracial lesbian couple, likening it to Les Amis by Jules Robert Auguste.

Records of magic spells from Roman Egypt (2nd to 4th centuries CE) include love spells commissioned by women to make other women fall in love with them. These spells are unusual because they were likely commissioned by women from lower social classes rather than the elite, and because they contain the names of ancient women with homoerotic desires. For example, Herais cast a love spell on Sarapias, and the following quotation is from Sophia's love spell for Gorgonia:

Burn, set on fire, inflame the heart, the liver, the spirit of Gorgonia, whom Nilogenia bore, with love and affection for Sophia, whom Isara bore, for a good end. ... Force Gorgonia, whom Nilogenia bore, to cast herself into the bath-house for the sake of Sophia, whom Isara bore, for her, so that she love her with passion, longing, unceasing love.

In the first century, a satirical story in the epigrams of Martial told of a masculine woman named Philaenis who had sex with women .

The Roman fabulist Phaedrus attempted to explain lesbianism through a myth: the Titan Prometheus, coming home drunk from a party, had mistakenly exchanged the genitals of some women and some men. Phaedrus remarks: "Lust now enjoys perverted pleasure."

Roman writer Seneca the Elder used the hypothetical of a husband who killed his wife and her female lover as an example of a legal case where the facts were too obscene to discuss openly.

The lesbian love story between Iphis and Ianthe, in Book IX of Ovid's the Metamorphoses, is especially vivid. When Iphis' mother becomes pregnant, her husband declares that he will kill the child if it is a girl. She bears a girl and attempts to conceal her sex by giving her a name that is of ambiguous gender: Iphis. When the "son" is thirteen, the father chooses a golden-haired maiden named Ianthe as the "boy's" bride. The love of the two girls is written sympathetically:

They were of equal age, they both were lovely,
Had learned the ABC from the same teachers,
And so love came to both of them together
In simple innocence, and filled their hearts
With equal longing.

However, as the marriage draws ever closer, Iphis recoils, calling her love "monstrous and unheard of." The goddess Isis hears the girl's moans and turns her into a boy.

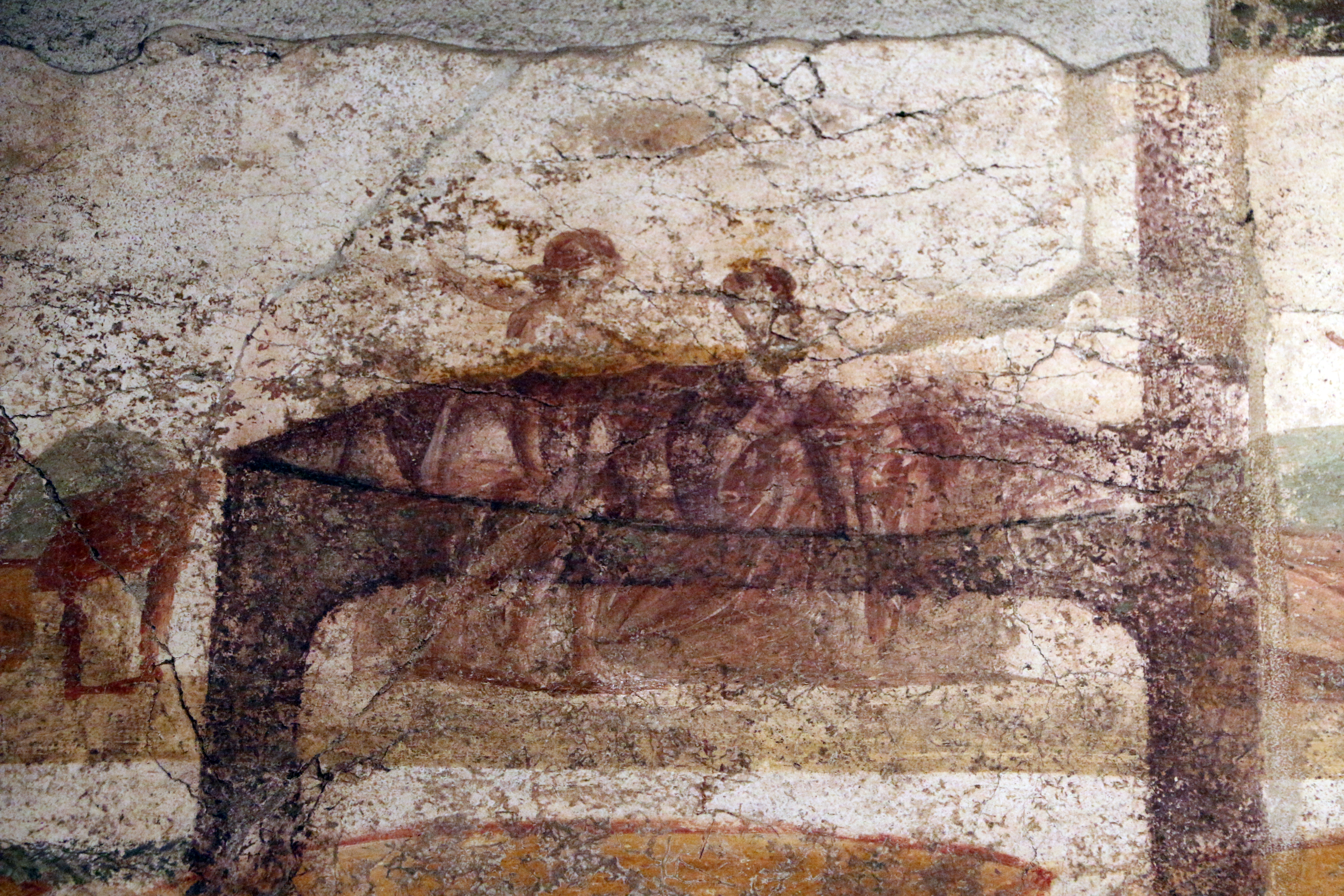
A wall painting of a lesbian sex scene. Suburban baths, Pompeii

Iamblichus, a Greek novelist from the first century AD, is best known for his Babylonaica, or Babylonian Tales. The Babylonaica contains a side story about "Berenice, who was daughter of the king of Egypt, and about her wild and lawless passions: and how she had relations with Mesopotamia." According to an ancient summary of the episode, Berenice and Mesopotamia (a woman) are wed. Although the Babylonaica mainly deals with a heterosexual couple, Sinonis and Rhodanes, Berenice and Mesopotamia exist as foils for the pair. Classicist Helen Morales cautions that this tale ought not to be treated as "certain evidence...that lesbian marriages were performed in the Roman imperial period," but the mere fact that it exists and survives is remarkable.

Lucian's Dialogues of the Courtesans contain an episode in which a woman named Megilla renames herself Megillus and wears a wig to cover her shaved head. She marries Demonassa of Corinth, although Megillus is from Lesbos. Her friend Leaena comments that "They say there are women like that in Lesbos, with faces like men, and unwilling to consort with men, but only with women, as though they themselves were men." Megillus seduces Leaena, who feels that the experience is too disgusting to describe in detail. In Sapphistries: A Global History of Love Between Women, Leila J. Rupp writes, "Two things are significant in this depiction: the connection of an aggressive woman from Lesbos with masculinity and the portrayal of the seduced as a prostitute."

In another dialogue ascribed to Lucian, two men debate over which is better, male love or heterosexuality. One man protested that if male affairs were legitimized, then lesbianism would soon be condoned as well, an unthinkable notion.

In the ruins of Pompeii, a Roman town destroyed in 79 CE, archaeologists discovered a love poem graffitied onto a wall. The poem is written with feminine declensions for both speaker and addressee, and identified archivally as Corpus Inscriptionum Latinarum 4.5296.

During early Christianity in the Roman Empire, one work of note was the Apocalypse of Peter. It seems to have been most prominent in the 2nd–3rd centuries when Christians were still a tiny minority, and was not ultimately included in the canon of the New Testament. It is one of the earliest depictions of hell, and suggests lesbians are one category of sinners to be tormented by punishments after the Second Coming of Jesus, although the passage phrases it as secondary to a condemnation of male homoeroticism, and was possibly added by a later editor or scribe:

And other men and women being thrown down from a great precipice fell to the bottom and again were driven by those who were set over them to go up upon the precipice, and thence were thrown down again, and thus they had no rest from this punishment. These were the ones who defiled their bodies acting as women. And the women who were with them were those who lay with one another as a man with a woman.

— Apocalypse of Peter 32, Greek version

== Asia ==
=== China ===
In early Chinese history, sexual activity between women was accepted and sometimes actively encouraged. Female same-sex relationships were described with a special term (traditional Chinese: 對食; simplified Chinese: 对食; pinyin: duìshí), literally "paired eating," possibly referring to cunnilingus. In the second or third century AD Ying Shao defined it as "when palace women attach themselves as husband and wife." Such relationships sometimes formed between government slaves or members of the emperor's harem. For example, under Emperor Cheng's rule (33–7 BC) the slave Dào Fáng (Chinese: 道房) had a homosexual relationship with Cáo Gōng (traditional Chinese: 曹宮; simplified Chinese: 曹宫), the daughter of a slave. The sex handbook Dongxuanzi (Chinese: 洞玄子; pinyin: Dòng Xuán Zǐ, possibly dating to the fifth century AD) also contains examples of female same-sex contact. In the position called The Paired Dance of the Female Blue Phoenixes, two women practice scissoring.

Historical Chinese culture did not recognize a concept of sexual orientation, or a framework to divide people based on same-sex or opposite-sex attractions. Although there was a significant culture surrounding homosexual men, there was none for women. Outside their duties to bear sons to their husbands, women were perceived as having no sexuality at all.

This did not mean that women could not pursue sexual relationships with other women, but that such associations could not impose upon women's relationships to men. Rare references to lesbianism were written by Ying Shao, who identified same-sex relationships between women in imperial courts who behaved as husband and wife as dui shi (paired eating). Westernization drove the idea that all sexual behavior not resulting in reproduction was aberrant.

From 1865 onward, the liberty of being employed in silk factories allowed some women to live in communes with other women, styling themselves tzu-shu nii (never to marry) or sou-hei (self-combers, for adopting hairstyles of married women). These communes ended as a result of the Great Depression and were subsequently discouraged by the communist government as a relic of feudal China.

"Golden Orchid Associations," which existed in Southern China into the 20th century, promoted formal marriages between women, who were then allowed to adopt children. In contemporary Chinese society, tongzhi (same goal or spirit) is the term used to refer to homosexuals; most Chinese people are reluctant to divide this classification further to identify lesbians.

=== India ===
The Arthashastra, an ancient Indian treatise on statecraft likely edited and compiled between the second and third centuries CE, describes the fines individuals must pay for engaging in ayoni, non-vaginal sex. This category includes both heterosexual and homosexual sex, and the fine for two women is lower than the fine for heterosexual sex. Overall, lesbian sex is "unsanctioned" in the Arthashastra, but is also "treated as a minor offense."

The Manusmriti, a first century legal text, places a very small fine upon sex between nonvirgin women; however, one who "manually deflowers a virgin" is sentenced to the loss of two fingers. If two virgins are caught, the 'doer' "has to pay double the girl's dowry and is given ten whiplashes." The Manusmriti fails to provide a punishment for mutual oral or non-penetrative sex.

Sanskrit medical texts mention "sexual act[s] in which both the parties are female." The Sushruta Samhita and Charaka Samhita both classify lesbianism as a disease resulting from an atypical conception. The latter describes it as incurable, and states that a lesbian is "a woman who has an aversion for man and who has no breasts." The term used for a lesbian in these texts is nārīṣaṇḍha.

The Kama Sutra mentions phallus-shaped bulbs, roots, and fruits used as dildos in lesbian sex, and also records cunnilingus between women.

Conversations around the visibility and acceptance of lesbianism in India were prompted by Deepa Mehta's 1996 film Fire, the release of which caused some theaters in India to be attacked by religious extremists.

Terms used to label homosexuals are often rejected by Indian activists for being the result of imperialist influence, but most discourse on homosexuality centers men. Women's rights groups in India continue to debate the legitimacy of including lesbian issues in their platforms, as lesbians and material focusing on female homosexuality are frequently suppressed.

=== Japan ===
Relationships between women are described in The Princess in Search of Herself, a piece of literature from either the Heian or Kamakura period. Chūjō is a lady-in-waiting for the High Priestess at Ise, and the two are romantically involved. Chūjō becomes angry and jealous when the high priestess abandons her to pursue a relationship with Kozaishō, another lady-in-waiting. The text describes physical intimacy between women clearly.

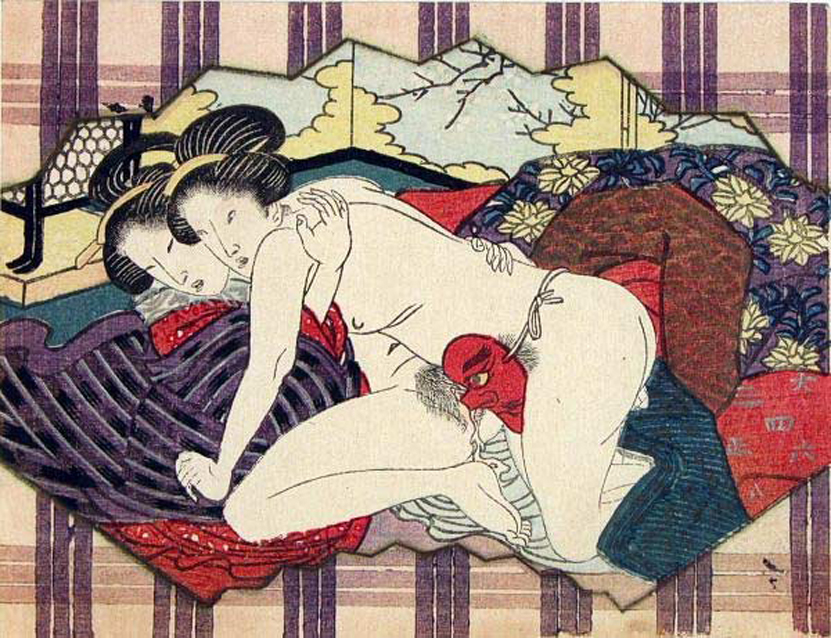
A historic shunga woodblock printing (c. 1500) from Japan depicting two women having sex

It has been suggested that the famous Heian period writer Murasaki Shikibu loved women, based on potentially homoerotic poems exchanged with other women. One section of her diary reads:

In particular I missed Lady Dainagon ...I sent her the following:
How I long for those waters on which we lay,
A longing keener than the frost on a duck's wing.
To which she replied:
Awakening to find no friend to brush away the frost,
The mandarin duck longs for her mate at night.

Bowring notes that the mandarin duck was a firmly established metaphor for lovers at the time, but states that the relationship was only platonic. Some have criticized the hesitance to acknowledge lesbian readings of poems like these as "an explaining away of the simplest interpretation of a text in favor of a more complicated, but heterosexually normative, reading."

Edward Kamens notes the erotically charged nature of poetic exchanges between Senshi and Kodaifu, and Ukon and Taifu, both in the Heian period. He argues that they "would readily be read as explicit tropes of sexual desire" if they had not been exchanged between two women.

Other references to same-sex practices between women before the Edo period are more ambiguous. In the Kojiki the sun goddess Amaterasu is lured out of a cave by Ame no Uzume dancing and removing her clothes. Dildos dating from as early as the Nara period may have been used for masturbation rather than lesbian sex.

The term rezubian, a Japanese pronunciation of "lesbian," was used during the 1920s. Westernization brought more independence for women and allowed some Japanese women to wear pants.

=== Malaysia ===
The term pondan is used in Malaysia to refer to gay men, but since there is no historical context to reference lesbians, the term is used for female homosexuals as well. As in many Asian countries, open homosexuality is discouraged in many social levels, so many Malaysian lesbians lead double lives.

=== South Korea ===
Crown Princess Sun was banished from her home in Joseon in 1454, after it was discovered that she had an intimate relationship with one of her maids.

Women in South Korea are taught to prioritize motherhood, chastity, and virginity. Very few women are free to express themselves through sexuality, although there is a growing organization for lesbians named Kkirikkiri.

=== Thailand ===
Sources on female homosexuality in Thai history primarily discuss royal harems, using the label เล่นเพื่อน len-phuean, which literally means "to play [with] friends." One of the earliest references is a law from King Borommatrailokkanat (who reigned 1448–1488), which penalizes lesbian relationships between palace women with whipping and which survives as part of the Three Seals Law. There is no evidence of this punishment ever being used, and an American ambassador in the 19th century wrote that homosexuality was very common, and that only monks had been punished for it.

Another source of evidence for female same-sex relationships is poetry and fiction based partly on real royal harems. The earliest such literature, from the Rattanakosin Kingdom, is unusual in focusing more on female homosexuality than male homosexuality. However, many of the literary sources are critical, and describe lesbianism as something to be avoided. A mural at Wat Khongkharam depicts women surreptitiously touching each other's breasts, but also depicts women being punished for lesbianism.

=== The Philippines ===
Leona Florentino was born in the Philippines during the Spanish colonial regime in 1849. She is the mother of Philippine women's literature and the pioneer in Philippine lesbian literature, known for kickstarting her homeland's feminist movement, which also led her to be honored as the mother of feminist literature in the country. The term tomboy is used in the Philippines, particularly in Manila, to denote women who are more masculine.

== Greece ==
=== Ancient Greece ===
==== Sappho ====
The lives of ancient Greek women are in general little-documented. In a notable exception, Sappho of Lesbos (c. 630 – c. 570 BC) wrote extensive poetry regarding her love for other women, fragments of which survive.

Sappho is the most cited example of an ancient Greek woman who may have actually engaged in sexual relationships with women. The earliest evidence of Sappho's reputation for homosexual desire comes from the Hellenistic period, with a fragment of a biography found in the Oxyrhynchus Papyri criticizing Sappho for being "gynaikerastria."

In her Ode to Aphrodite, the poet asks Aphrodite for aid in wooing another woman. One fragment, Sappho 94, contains a clear mention of lesbian sexual acts:

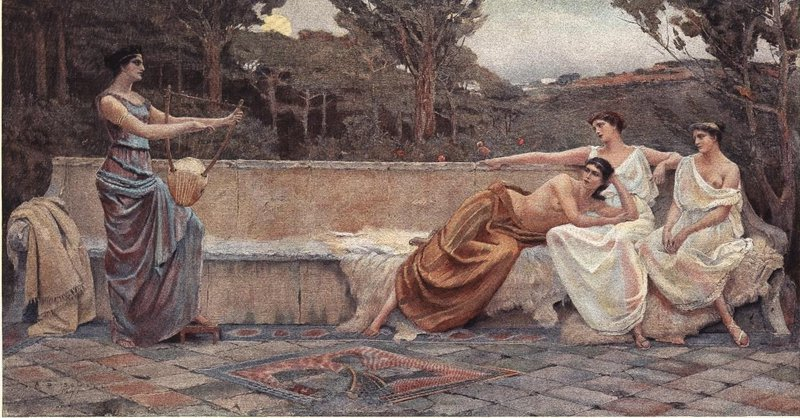
Sappho by Amanda Brewster Sewell, 1891. Sappho of Lesbos gave the term lesbian the connotation of erotic desire between women.

Sappho Fragment 94

I'm not pretending; I wish I were dead." She was leaving me in tears,

and over and over she said to me: "Sappho, it hurts; what's happened to us is just so grim; it isn't my choice, I swear it, to leave like this.."

These were the words that I answered her: "Go and be happy; remember me, for you know how we have paid court to you:

and if not, then I want to remind you ... and the good things we have enjoyed:

for at my side, many the crowns of violets and roses ... you have put on yourself,

and many the garlands woven from flowers you have cast round your delicate neck,

and with quantities of ... flowery perfume ... fit for a queen even, you anointed yourself all over,

and on soft beds ... delicate ... you have satisfied desire ...

Sappho's sexuality has been debated by historians. Some, such as Denys Page, argue that Sappho was attracted to women. Others, such as Eva Stigers, argue that the descriptions of love between women in Sappho's writings are not necessarily evidence of her own sexuality. Still further historians claim that Sappho's circle were involved in female homosexuality as a kind of initiation ritual.

At least two other woman poets wrote in the style of Sappho, Erinna of Teos or Telos (c. late 400s BC) and Nossis of Locri (c. 300 BC).

==== Other Ancient Greek works ====
Among the Athenians, the discussion and depiction of female homosexual activity seems to have been taboo. Kenneth Dover suggests that, due to the role played by the phallus in ancient Greek men's conceptions of sexuality, female homosexual love was not explicitly defined as a sexuality by the authors of surviving sources.

Some male-written works reference lesbianism. One example, from the 300s BC, is the tale of the four-legged humans told by Aristophanes in Plato's Symposium. (Note: "[H]e begins by treating of the origin of human nature. The sexes were originally three, men, women, and the union of the two; and they were made round—having four hands, four feet, two faces on a round neck, and the rest to correspond. Terrible was their strength and swiftness; and they were essaying to scale heaven and attack the gods. Doubt reigned in the celestial councils; the gods were divided between the desire of quelling the pride of man and the fear of losing the sacrifices. At last Zeus hit upon an expedient. Let us cut them in two, he said; then they will only have half their strength, and we shall have twice as many sacrifices. He spake, and split them as you might split an egg with an hair; and when this was done, he told Apollo to give their faces a twist and re-arrange their persons, taking out the wrinkles and tying the skin in a knot about the navel. The two halves went about looking for one another, and were ready to die of hunger in one another's arms. Then Zeus invented an adjustment of the sexes, which enabled them to marry and go their way to the business of life. Now the characters of men differ accordingly as they are derived from the original man or the original woman, or the original man-woman. Those who come from the man-woman are lascivious and adulterous; those who come from the woman form female attachments; those who are a section of the male follow the male and embrace him, and in him all their desires centre.") Another example, from the 100s CE, is the Dialogues of the Courtesans, where a female character talks about being seduced by two lesbian characters.

Later references to female homosexuality in Greek literature include an epigram by Asclepiades, which describes two women who reject Aphrodite's "rules" but instead do "other things which are not seemly." Dover comments on the "striking" hostility shown in the epigram to female homosexuality, contrasting it with Asclepiades' willingness to discuss his own homosexual desire in other works, suggesting that this apparent male anxiety about female homosexuality in ancient Greece is the reason for the paucity of sources discussing it.

The poet Alcman (fl. 7th century BC) wrote hymns known as partheneia, which discuss attraction between young women. Though these hymns are ambiguous, historians have posited that they are erotic or sexual.

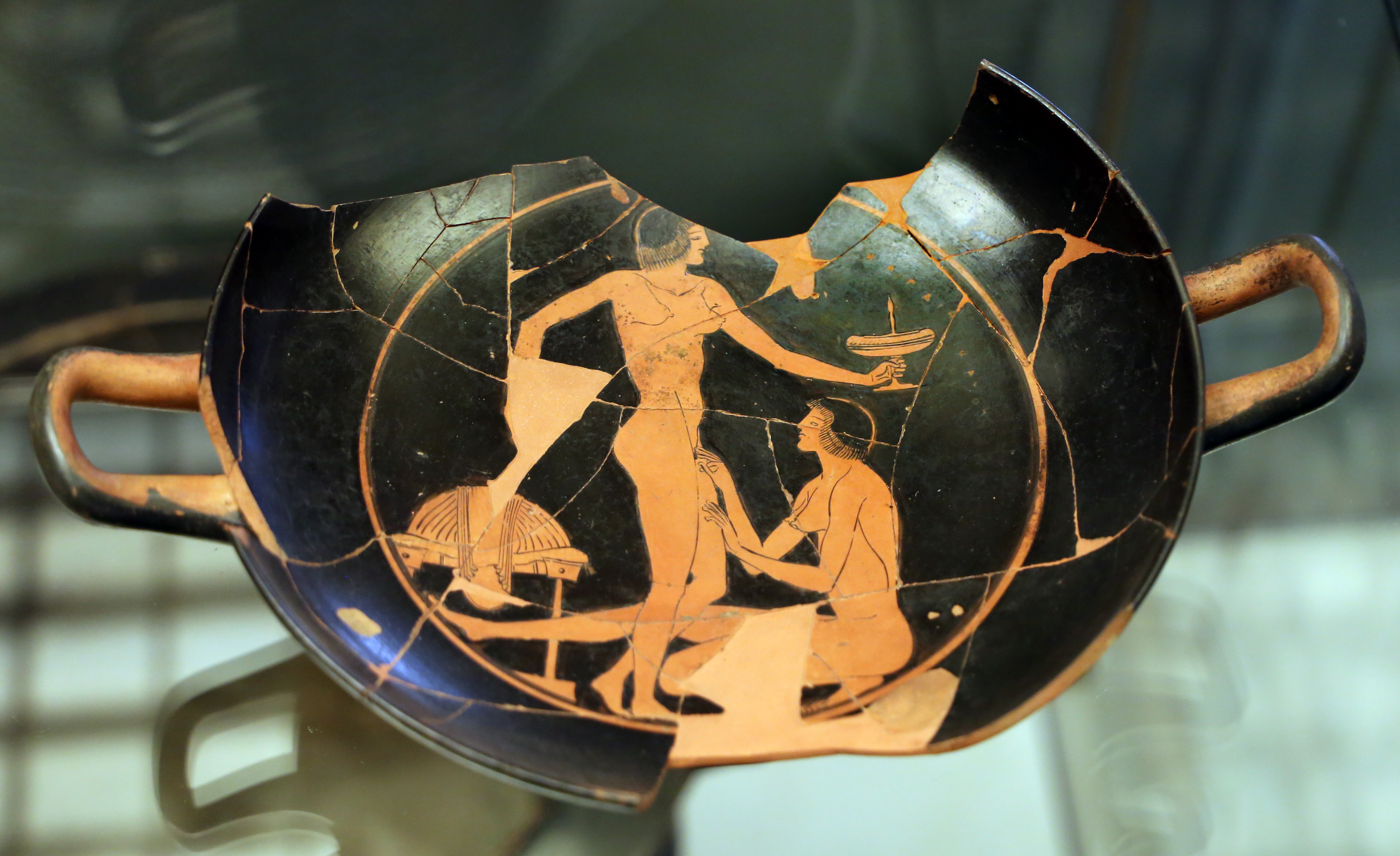
A red-figure kylix depicting two women in an intimate setting. Attributed to the painter Apollodorus, c. 490–480 BCE. (Tarquinia National Museum)

Some find evidence in Plutarch that Spartan women engaged in homosexual activities, although Plutarch wrote many centuries after classical Greece. In Plutarch's biography of Lycurgus of Sparta, part of his Parallel Lives, the author claims that older Spartan women formed relationships with girls that were similar to the erastes/eromenos relationships that existed between some older and younger male Greeks. Historian Sarah B. Pomeroy believes that Plutarch's depiction of homosexual relationships between Spartan women is plausible. Pomeroy argues that homosexual relationships between girls would have "flourished" in the girls' choirs that performed the partheneia of Alcman.

In Greek mythology, the story of Callisto has been interpreted as implying that Artemis and Callisto were lovers. The myth of the Amazons has also been interpreted as referring to female homosexual activities.

In visual culture, some ancient Greek red vase images portray women in affectionate or erotic scenes. For example, a plate from Archaic Thera appears to show two women courting. An Attic red figure vase in the collection of the Tarquinia National Museum in Italy shows a kneeling woman fingering the genitals of another woman in a rare explicit portrayal of sexual activity between women in Greek art, although it has also been interpreted as depicting one prostitute shaving or otherwise grooming the other in a non-sexual fashion.

== Middle East ==
=== Ancient Mesopotamia ===
Women's sexuality in ancient Mesopotamia is not well documented. Stephanie Lynn Budin, writing on love magic, argues that "there remains no evidence for lesbianism in this regard (or any other from Mesopotamia)." However, there are at least two pieces of textual evidence for Mesopotamian lesbianism. One is a divinatory text which mentions female same-sex activity, while another, more explicit text remains unpublished.

In addition, an Old Assyrian text writes of two women, Ewanika and Adi-matum, who had a betrothal contract for their "daughter." It is possible that the father died, leaving the two women as widows.

=== Medieval ===
In the 7th and 8th centuries, some women dressed in male attire when gender roles were less strict. The Caliphal court in Baghdad featured women who dressed as men, including false facial hair, but they competed with other women for the attentions of men.

Arabic-language historical records have used various terms to describe sexual practices between women. A common one is sahq, which refers to rubbing.

In the medieval Arab world, lesbianism was considered to be caused by heat generated in a woman's labia, which could be alleviated by friction against another woman's genitalia. Al-Kindi wrote:

Lesbianism is due to a vapor which, condensed, generates in the labia heat and an itch which only dissolve and become cold through friction and orgasm. When friction and orgasm take place, the heat turns into coldness because the liquid that a woman ejaculates in lesbian intercourse is cold whereas the same liquid that results from sexual union with men is hot. Heat, however, cannot be extinguished by heat; rather, it will increase since it needs to be treated by its opposite. As coldness is repelled by heat, so heat is also repelled by coldness.

Medical texts considered lesbianism to be congenital. For instance, Masawaiyh reported:

Lesbianism results when a nursing woman eats celery, rocket, melilot leaves and the flowers of a bitter orange tree. When she eats these plants and suckles her child, they will affect the labia of her suckling and generate an itch which the suckling will carry through her future life.

Ali ibn Nasr al-Katib's Encyclopedia of Pleasure contains a story about what is said to be the first lesbian couple in Arab history: the seventh-century Hind bint al-Nuʿmān, a Christian poet, and the legendary Arabic poet Hind bint al-Khuss. When Hind Bint al-Khuss died, her faithful lover "cropped her hair, wore black clothes, rejected worldly pleasures, vowed to God that she would lead an ascetic life until she passed away," and even built a monastery to commemorate her love. The 10th-century work al-Fihrist gives the titles of books about twelve other lesbian couples, but nothing other than the women's names has survived. According to the 12th-century writings of Sharif al-Idrisi, highly intelligent women were more likely to be lesbians; their intellectual prowess put them on a more even par with men.

Wallada bint al-Mustakfi, sometimes called the Arab Sappho, was an Andalusian poet whose love poetry to her student Muhja bint al-Tayyani has been lost since later authors refused to cite its sexually explicit content. Elsewhere, lesbian poetry has survived. Al-Jahiz cites the couplet "I drank wine for love of flirting/and I shifted towards lesbianism for fear of pregnancy." In A Promenade of the Hearts, Ahmad al-Tifashi cites several poems by lesbians where massage is used as a pretext for lesbian sex, as well as the same-sex philosophy of Rose, the head of one such lesbian massage group.

Leo Africanus describes with disgust the practices of female diviners in Fez who cure illnesses, saying that they are in fact sahacat, his rendition of the Arabic word for lesbians (Arabic: سحاقيات, romanized: siḥāqiyyāt). He describes how lesbians pretend to be sick so that the diviners will come to them. They then claim that the woman is possessed and that the only cure is to join the diviners, enabling her to leave her husband and become part of a lesbian community.

Some fictional women from Arabic folk epics can be viewed as lesbian, like Alûf from Delhemma, who says "I do neither long for marriage nor for men, but my heart has an inclination for the ladies." Rumors of harem lesbianism in the Arab world, like those reported by Allen Edwardes, tend to come from male Orientalist writers and have not been verified.

=== Contemporary Arab World ===
While male-written accounts of lesbianism in the Middle East exist, a 1978 treatise about repression in Iran asserted that women were completely silenced: "In the whole of Iranian history, [no woman] has been allowed to speak out for such tendencies ... To attest to lesbian desires would be an unforgivable crime."

In 1991, a lesbian anthropologist visited Yemen and reported that women in the town she visited were unable to comprehend her romantic relationship to another woman. Women in Pakistan are expected to marry men; those who do not are ostracized. Women may have intimate relations with other women so long as their wifely duties are met, their private matters are kept quiet, and the woman with whom they are involved is somehow related by family or logical interest to her lover.

The common term used to describe lesbianism in Arabic today is essentially the same term used to describe men, and thus the distinction between male and female homosexuality is to a certain extent linguistically obscured in contemporary queer discourse. Overall, the study of contemporary lesbian experience in the region is complicated by power dynamics in the postcolonial context, shaped even by what some scholars refer to as "homonationalism", the use of politicized understanding of sexual categories to advance specific national interests on the domestic and international stage.

Individuals identifying with or otherwise engaging in lesbian practices in the region can face family violence and societal persecution, including "honor killings". The justifications provided by murderers relate to a person's perceived sexual immorality and loss of virginity (outside of acceptable frames of marriage). Lesbians also face government persecution in the Middle East. In Yemen, homosexuality is criminalized, and women can face lashings, up to three years in prison or the death penalty for consensual lesbian sex.

== Continental Europe ==
=== Medieval and Renaissance ===
A 13th-century trobairitz, Bieiris de Romans, wrote a canso to another woman, Maria:

Thus I pray you, if it please you that true love
And celebration and sweet humility
should bring me such relief with you,
if it please you, lovely woman, then give me
that which most hope and joy promises
for in you lie my desire and my heart.

The canso is the genre in which love poems were written, but some have argued that it is possible that Maria was not a lover but a "female acquaintance, friend, confidante, or close relative." Clearer evidence for lesbian relationships is found in a 12th-century manuscript from Tegernsee. It contains lesbian love poems which were likely composed at a local monastery for women. The quote below, which "seems to presuppose a passionate physical relationship", is from A's poem to G:

When I recall the kisses you gave me,
And how with tender words you caressed my little breasts,
I want to die
Because I cannot see you.

The earliest law against female homosexuality appeared in France, in the legal treatise Li livres de jostice et de plet (c. 1260), which prescribed dismemberment for the first two offences and death by burning for the third. This penalty was a near exact copy of the penalty for a man, although what "dismemberment" could mean for a medieval woman is unknown.

There exist records of about a dozen women in the medieval period who were involved in lesbian sex, as defined by historian Judith Bennett as same-sex genital contact. All of these women are known through their involvement with the courts, and were imprisoned or executed.

In the Holy Roman Empire under Charles V, a law on sexual offences specifically prohibits sex acts between women. In Spain, Italy, and the Holy Roman Empire, sodomy between women was included in acts considered unnatural and punishable by burning to death, although few instances are recorded of this taking place. The earliest such execution occurred in Speier, Germany, in 1477.

Catharina Margaretha Linck was a Prussian woman who for most of her adult life presented herself as a man. She married a woman and, based on their sexual activity together, was convicted of sodomy and executed by order of King Frederick William I in 1721. Linck's execution was the last for lesbian sexual activity in Europe and an anomaly for its time. Linck and other women who were accused of using dildos, such as two nuns in 16th century Spain executed for using "material instruments," were punished more severely than those who did not.

Not all women were so harshly punished, though. In the early fifteenth century, a Frenchwoman, Laurence, wife of Colin Poitevin, was imprisoned for her affair with another woman, Jehanne. She pleaded for clemency on the grounds that Jehanne had been the instigator and she regretted her sins, and was freed to return home after six months imprisonment.

Forty days' penance was demanded of nuns who "rode" each other or were discovered to have touched each other's breasts. In Pescia, Italy, an abbess, Sister Benedetta Carlini, was documented in inquests between 1619 and 1623 as having committed grave offences including a passionately erotic love affair with another nun. She claimed to have been possessed by a divine male spirit named "Splenditello." She was declared the victim of a "diabolical obsession" and placed in the convent's prison for the last 35 years of her life.

An Italian surgeon, William of Bologna, attributed lesbianism to a "growth emanating from the mouth of the womb and appearing outside the vagina as a pseudopenis."

The Christian Church took a strict view on same-sex relations between women. Penitentials, developed by Celtic monks in Ireland, were unofficial guidebooks which became popular, especially in the British Isles. These books listed crimes and the penances that must be done for them. For example, "...he who commits the male crime of the Sodomites shall do penance for four years." The several versions of the Paenitentiale Theodori, attributed to Theodore of Tarsus, who became archbishop of Canterbury in the 7th century, make special references to lesbianism. The Paenitentiale states, "If a woman practices vice with a woman she shall do penance for three years." Penitentials soon spread from the British Isles to mainland Europe. Most medieval penitentials either did not explicitly discuss lesbian activities at all, or treated them as a less serious sin than male homosexuality.

During the Renaissance, some women put on male personae and went undetected for years or decades. These women have been described as transvestite lesbians. Some historians view cases of cross-dressing women to be manifestations of women seizing social power, or their way of making sense out of their desire for women.

Female homoeroticism later became so common in literature and theater that historians suggest it was fashionable for a period during the Renaissance.

=== Eastern Bloc ===
In the Eastern Bloc, although there were no standard laws regarding discrimination against gays and lesbians, self-expression was discouraged as it encouraged people toward actions that were outside the accepted norms of a harmonious socialist society. As such, state police often used blackmail and kept dossiers on homosexual people as a way for them to be manipulated by the state. Activists in Eastern Europe were aware of events in the West, but forming associations for any type of special interest group was forbidden until the 1980s. Because state sanction was not given, many support systems for lesbians operated clandestinely. For example, in 1986 in East Germany, Ursula Sillge formed the Sunday Club to offer a means for lesbians both to gather outside state-sanctioned churches and for them to provide educational materials about homosexuality to each other and press authorities to acknowledge the discrimination faced by lesbians and gays. The Sunday Club would not gain official sanction and the ability to register as an organization until 1990. In Hungary, the first legally recognized organization to represent the LGBT community was Homéros. It was organized in 1988 at the Ipoly Cinema, where Ildikó Juhász operated an after-hours safe space for lesbians to come together to create social networks.

=== France ===
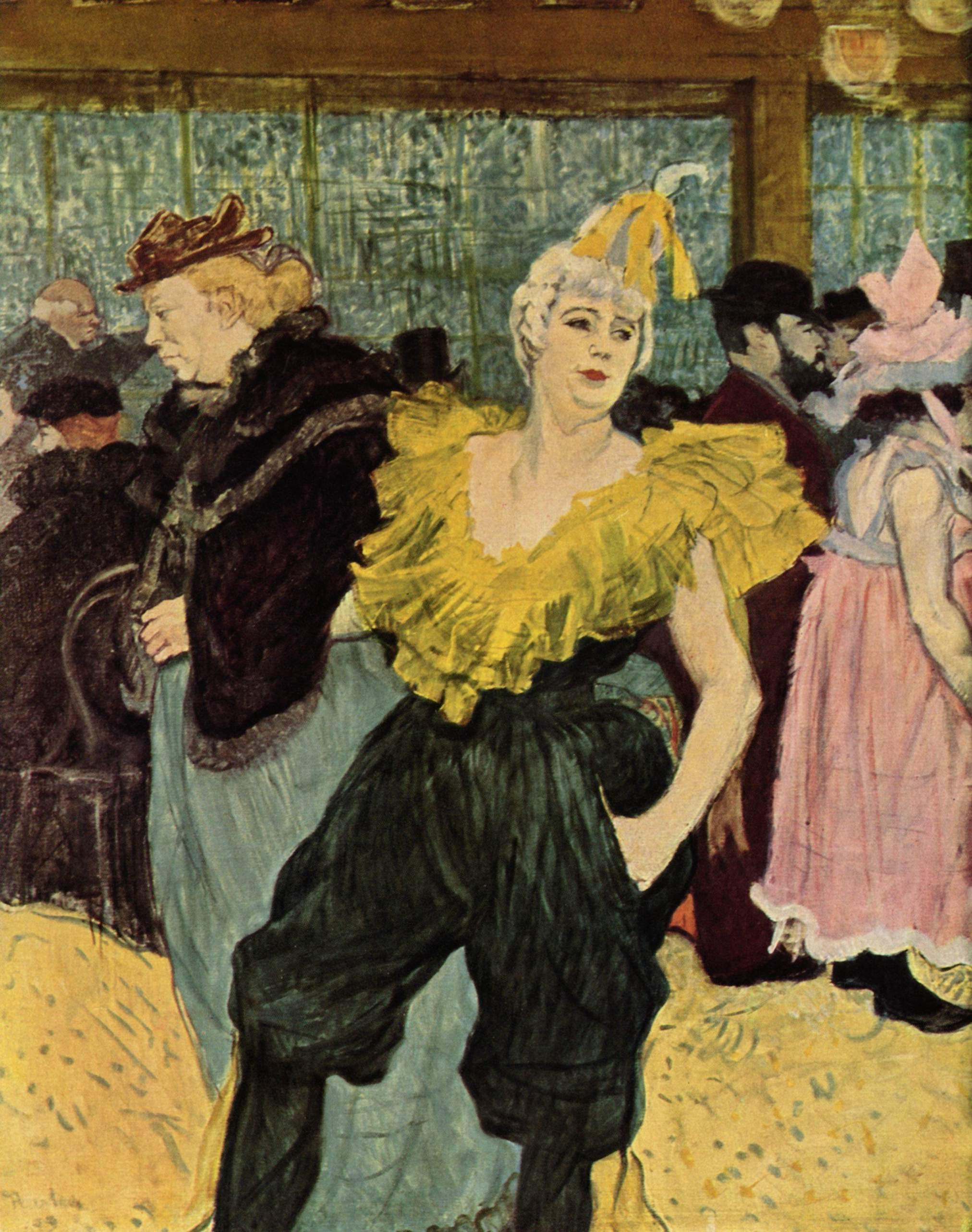
In Paris in the late nineteenth and early twentieth century, lesbians became more visible in art and in the public sphere. A painting by Henri de Toulouse-Lautrec of entertainer Cha-U-Kao at the Moulin Rouge.

Anne Grandjean, disguised as male, married and relocated with her wife to Lyons, but was exposed by a woman with whom she had had a previous affair and sentenced to time in the stocks and prison.

Marie Antoinette was the subject of lesbian speculation between 1795 and 1796.

Before the late nineteenth century, only among the less respectable members of society does it seem that there was any sort of a lesbian subculture. Academics believe that there was such a subculture amongst dancers and prostitutes in 18th- and early-19th-century Paris (as well as in 18th-century Amsterdam).

The late nineteenth and early twentieth centuries saw an increase in lesbian visibility in France, both in the public sphere and in art and literature. Fin de siècle society in Paris included bars, restaurants, and cafés frequented and owned by lesbians, such as Le Hanneton, La Souris, and Le Rat Mort. Descriptions of these venues were included in tourist guides and journalism of the era. These guides and articles also mentioned houses of prostitution that were uniquely for lesbians. Henri de Toulouse-Lautrec created paintings of many of the lesbians he met, some of whom frequented or worked at the famed Moulin Rouge.

Private salons, like the one hosted by the American expatriate Nathalie Barney, drew many lesbian and bisexual artists and writers, including Julie d'Aubigny, Romaine Brooks, Renee Vivien, Colette, Djuna Barnes, Gertrude Stein, and Radclyffe Hall. One of Barney's lovers, the courtesan Liane de Pougy, published a best-selling novel based on their romance called l'Idylle Saphique (1901).

Many publicly acknowledged lesbians and bisexual women were entertainers and actresses. Some, like the writer Colette and her lover Mathilde de Morny, performed lesbian theatrical scenes in cabarets; these drew outrage and censorship.

=== Germany ===
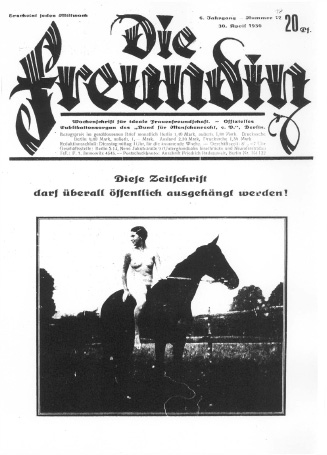
Berlin's thriving lesbian community in the 1920s published Die Freundin magazine between 1924 and 1933.

Although it was sometimes tolerated, homosexuality was illegal in Germany and law enforcement used permitted gatherings as an opportunity to register the names of homosexuals for future reference. However, there was no specific law against lesbianism.

Magnus Hirschfeld's Scientific-Humanitarian Committee, which promoted tolerance for homosexuals in Germany, welcomed lesbian participation, and drove a surge of lesbian-themed writing and political activism in the German feminist movement.

Berlin had a vibrant homosexual culture in the 1920s. Die Freundin magazines like The Girlfriend and Garçonne (AKA Frauenliebe, or Woman Love) were aimed at lesbians and transvestites. These publications were owned, published, and written by men. Around 1926, Selli Engler founded Die BIF – Blätter Idealer Frauenfreundschaften (The BIF – Papers on Ideal Women Friendships), the first lesbian publication owned, published, and written by women.

Around 50 clubs, varying from large tourist attractions to small neighborhood cafés, catered to lesbians. In 1928, the lesbian bar and nightclub guide Berlins lesbische Frauen (The Lesbians of Berlin) by Ruth Margarite Röllig popularized the German capital as a center of lesbian activity. The cabaret song "Das lila Lied" ("The Lavender Song") became an anthem to the lesbians of Berlin.

Homosexual subculture disappeared in Germany with the rise of the Nazis in 1933. During the Holocaust, lesbians who were Jewish, Roma, or politically dissident were persecuted primarily for these other characteristics. Prior to 1939, lesbians were imprisoned as "asocials," which was "a broad category applied to all people who evaded Nazi rule." Asocials were identified with an inverted black triangle. In the United States during the 1990s, some lesbians used the black triangle symbol as an identifier; the pink triangle was also used for the combined lesbian-gay movement.

People who did not conform to Nazi ideals were considered asocial, imprisoned, and identified with a black triangle. Lesbians were deemed asocial.

Many lesbians reclaimed the symbolism of the pink triangle, though the Nazis only applied it to gay men.

=== Italy ===
Laudomia Forteguerri was an accomplished Italian poet and a member of one of the most powerful families in the sixteenth-century Republic of Siena. She has been called Italy's earliest lesbian writer, and she was famous for her beauty, wit, and intelligence.

=== Spain ===
Eleno de Céspedes, was a Spanish surgeon born into slavery who married a man and later a woman, and was tried by the Spanish Inquisition. Céspedes may have been an intersex person, as different doctors' accounts portray her as having either female anatomy or both sets of genitals. If a woman, Céspedes may have been a lesbian and/or the first female surgeon known in Spain and perhaps in Europe.

Princess Isabella of Parma found more fulfillment in her relationship with her sister-in-law, Archduchess Maria Christina, than with her husband.

=== Sweden ===
Queen Christina of Sweden (b. 1626) frequently dressed as a man, abdicated the throne in 1654 to avoid marriage, and was known to pursue romantic relationships with women. Her relationships were noted during her lifetime. She never married. Christina seems to have written passionate letters to and slept in the same bed as Ebba Sparre. According to Veronica Buckley, Christina was a "dabbler" who was "painted a lesbian, a prostitute, a hermaphrodite, and an atheist" by her contemporaries, though "in that tumultuous age, it is hard to determine which was the most damning label."

== British Isles ==
=== England ===
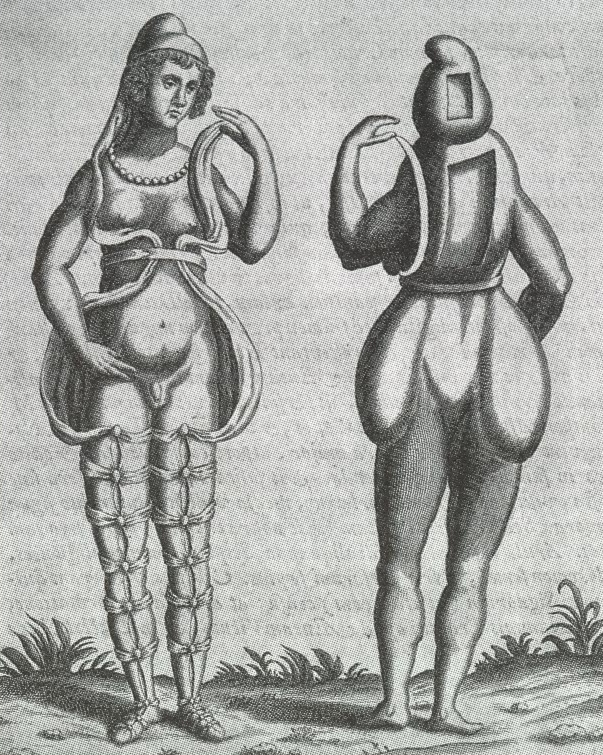
Lesbianism and hermaphroditism, depicted here in an engraving c. 1690, were very similar concepts during the Renaissance.

Ideas about women's sexuality were linked to contemporary understanding of female physiology. The vagina was considered an inward version of the penis; in lesbians, nature was thought to be trying to right itself by prolapsing the vagina to form a penis.Consequently, hermaphroditism was understood as synonymous with lesbianism. A longer, engorged clitoris was thought to be used in lesbian sex. Penetration was the focus of concern in all sexual acts, and a woman who was thought to have uncontrollable desires because of her engorged clitoris was called a tribade (literally, one who rubs). For a while, masturbation and lesbian sex carried the same meaning.

Tribades were simultaneously considered members of the lower class trying to ruin virtuous women, and representatives of an aristocracy corrupt with debauchery. Satirical writers began to suggest that political rivals (or more often, their wives) engaged in tribadism in order to harm their reputations. Queen Anne was rumored to have had passionate relationships with her courtier Abigail Masham, Baroness Masham, and her close advisor Sarah Churchill, Duchess of Marlborough. When Churchill was ousted as the queen's favorite, she purportedly spread allegations of the queen having affairs with her bedchamberwomen.

Some historians, such as Valerie Traub, have argued that a period of acceptance led to increasing cultural sanctions against lesbian behaviors. For instance, in 1709, Delariviere Manley published The New Atlantis, attacking lesbian activities. However, others, such as Friedli and Lillian Faderman have played down the cultural opposition to female homosexuality, pointing out that it was better tolerated than male homosexual activities.

Despite social stigma, English courts did not prosecute homosexual activities between women, and lesbianism was largely ignored by the law in England. Although, according to Henry Fielding, Charles Hamilton (female husband) was whipped for fraud, the courts and the press of the time do not seem to have believed she committed any crimes. Terry Castle contends that English law in the eighteenth century ignored female homosexual activity not out of indifference, but out of male fears about acknowledging and reifying lesbianism.

Lady Catherine Jones' decision not to marry, and her close relationships and cohabitation with women throughout her life and into her death, merit speculation that she was a lesbian. The minimal surviving documentation of her life makes this difficult to assert with confidence, but readers can read her 'close unions' with Kendall and Astell as not entirely platonic. Englishwoman Mary Frith has also been described as lesbian. In 1680, Arabella Hunt married a "James Howard." Their marriage was annulled two years later upon the discovery that "James Howard" was actually a woman, Amy Poulter.

Literature of the time attempted to rationalize some lesbian activities, commonly searching for visible indications of sapphic tendencies. In The New Atlantis, the "real" lesbians are depicted as masculine. However, Catherine Craft-Fairchild argues in "Sexual and Textual Indeterminacy: Eighteenth-Century English Representations of Sapphism" (2006) that Delariviere Manley fails to establish a coherent narrative of lesbians as anatomically distinct from other women. In The Female Husband, Fielding focuses on the corruption of Hamilton's mind. Jonathan Swift, writing for The Tatler in 1711, acknowledges the inherent difficulty in establishing such a narrative framework, by describing a woman having her virginity tested by a lion. Despite the onlookers' failure to detect anything amiss, the lion identified her as "no true Virgin."

During the same period, positive writings concerning female homosexuality drew on the languages of both female same-sex friendship and heterosexual romance.

==== 18th century ====
The term "lesbian" came into use in Britain during the 1730s.

Two marriages between women were recorded in Cheshire, England in 1707 (Hannah Wright and Anne Gaskill) and 1708 (Ane Norton and Alice Pickford), with no comment about both parties being female.

In 1709, English aristocrat Lady Mary Wortley Montagu wrote to Anne Wortley: "Nobody was so entirely, so faithfully yours ... I put in your lovers, for I don't allow it possible for a man to be so sincere as I am."

Poet Anna Seward had a devoted friendship with Honora Sneyd. Sneyd was the subject of many of Seward's poems. When Sneyd married despite Seward's protest, Seward's poems became angry, and she continued to write about Sneyd long after her death.

Writer and philosopher Mary Wollstonecraft was attached to a woman named Fanny Blood. Writing to another woman, Wollstonecraft declared, "The roses will bloom when there's peace in the breast, and the prospect of living with my Fanny gladdens my heart:—You know not how I love her." (Note: Wollstonecraft and Blood set up a girls' boarding school so they could live and work together, and Wollstonecraft named her first child after Blood. Wollstonecraft's first novel Mary: A Fiction, in part, addressed her relationship with Fanny Blood.)

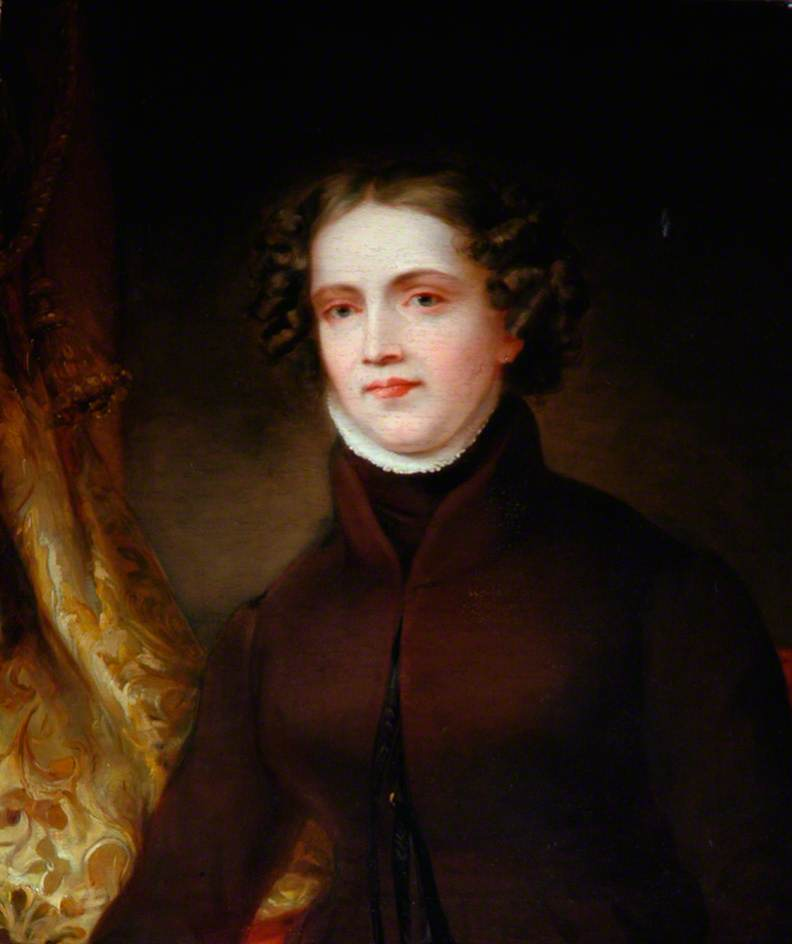
Anne Lister

==== 19th century ====
Diarist Anne Lister recorded her affairs with women between 1817 and 1840. Some of her diaries, detailing her sexual relationships with Marianna Belcombe and Maria Barlow, were written in code. She is sometimes considered the first modern lesbian.

==== 20th century ====
Helen Boyle, the first female GP in Brighton, spent the last 17 years of her life with partner Marguerite du Pre Gore Lindsay. Louisa Martindale, also a GP in Brighton, spent three decades with her female partner, Ismay FitzGerald, per her autobiography A Woman Surgeon.

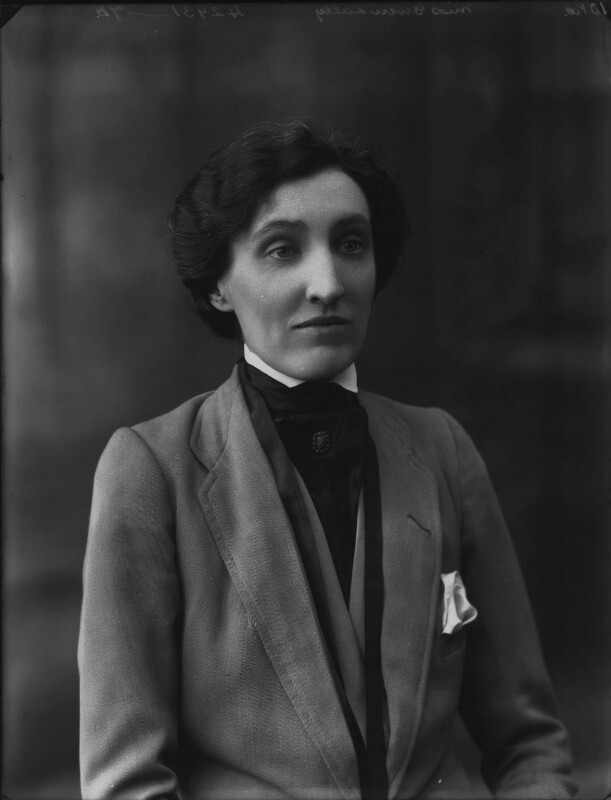
Gwen Lally

Actress, pageant master, and theatre producer Gwen Lally was known for her masculine dress sense, and spent at least 40 years with partner Mabel Gibson.

A section to create an offence of "gross indecency" between females was added to a bill in the United Kingdom House of Commons and passed there in 1921, but was rejected in the House of Lords, apparently because they were concerned any attention paid to sexual misconduct would also promote it.

Authors and lifelong friends Virginia Woolf and Vita Sackville-West were lovers between 1925 and 1935, exchanging extensive romantic correspondence. In 1926, while vacationing in Milan, Sackville-West wrote the below letter to Woolf:

I am reduced to a thing that wants Virginia. I composed a beautiful letter to you in the sleepless nightmare hours of the night, and it has all gone: I just miss you, in a quite simple desperate human way. You, with all your un-dumb letters, would never write so elementary phrase as that; perhaps you wouldn’t even feel it. And yet I believe you’ll be sensible of a little gap. But you’d clothe it in so exquisite a phrase that it would lose a little of its reality. Whereas with me it is quite stark: I miss you even more than I could have believed; and I was prepared to miss you a good deal. So this letter is just really a squeal of pain. It is incredible how essential to me you have become. I suppose you are accustomed to people saying these things. Damn you, spoilt creature; I shan’t make you love me any the more by giving myself away like this—But oh my dear, I can’t be clever and stand-offish with you: I love you too much for that. Too truly. You have no idea how stand-offish I can be with people I don’t love. I have brought it to a fine art. But you have broken down my defences. And I don’t really resent it …

Please forgive me for writing such a miserable letter.

V.

In a 1927 letter to Sackville-West, Woolf wrote, "Yes yes yes I do like you. I am afraid to write the stronger word."

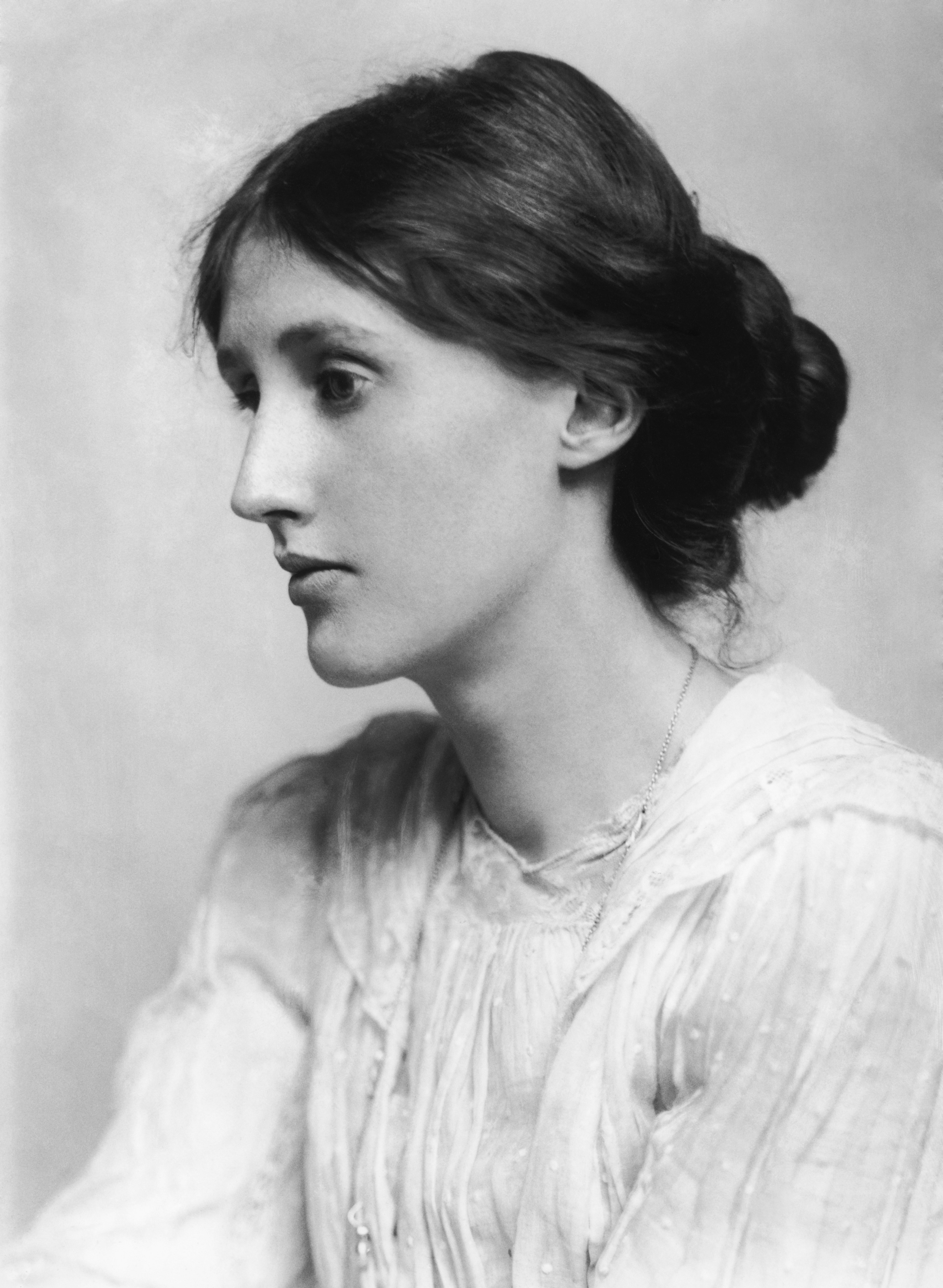
Virginia Woolf in 1902

In the postwar period, a movement to eliminate homosexuals from public service positions began in the UK (as well as in Australia and Canada).

British lesbians published the magazine Arena Three beginning in 1964.

In 1974, Maureen Colquhoun came out as the first lesbian MP for the Labour Party in the UK. When elected, she was in a heterosexual marriage.

The pop singer Dusty Springfield dated women throughout her life, including American folk singer Norma Tanega, photojournalist Faye Harris, musician Carole Pope, and actress Teda Bracci.

During the miners' strike from 1984 to 1985, lesbians organized in favor of Welsh miners as part of the activist group Lesbians and Gays Support the Miners. A later group, Lesbians Against Pit Closures, was formed after an ideological schism within Lesbians and Gays Support the Miners. This story is dramatized in the 2014 film Pride.

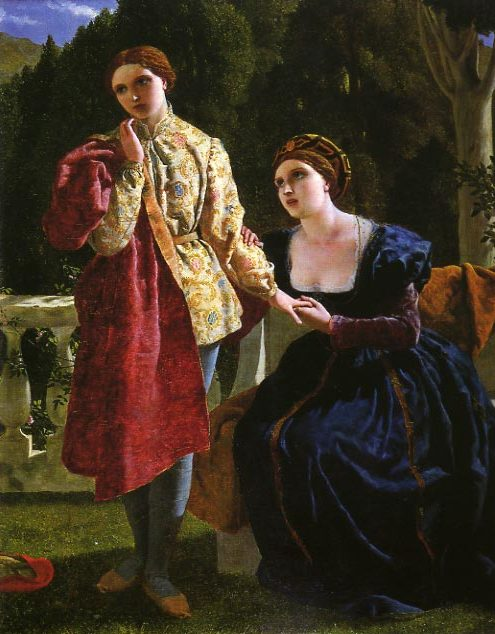
Gender masquerade was a popular dramatic device in the 16th and 17th centuries, such as this scene of Viola and Olivia from Shakespeare's Twelfth Night painted by Frederick Pickersgill (1859).

==== In literature ====
Homoerotic elements in early literature were pervasive, specifically the masquerade of one gender for another to seduce an unsuspecting woman. Such plot devices were used in Twelfth Night (1601), The Faerie Queene (1590), and The Bird in a Cage (1633).

In 1928, Radclyffe Hall published the novel The Well of Loneliness. The novel's plot centers around Stephen Gordon, an invert woman. The novel was intended to be a call for tolerance for inverts by publicizing their disadvantages and lack of control over the condition. The novel's trial for obscenity was described as "the crystallizing moment in the construction of a visible modern English lesbian subculture" by professor Laura Doan.

Newspaper stories frankly divulged that the book's content includes "sexual relations between Lesbian women," and photographs of Hall often accompanied details about lesbians in most major print outlets within a span of six months. Hall reflected the appearance of a "mannish" woman in the 1920s: short cropped hair, tailored suits (often with pants), and monocle that became widely recognized as a "uniform."

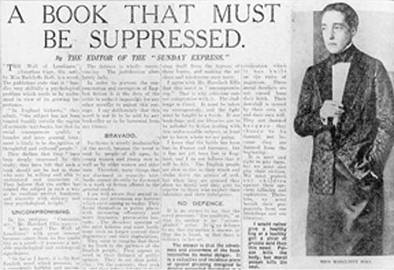
Radclyffe Hall's image appeared in many newspapers discussing the content of The Well of Loneliness.

=== Ireland ===
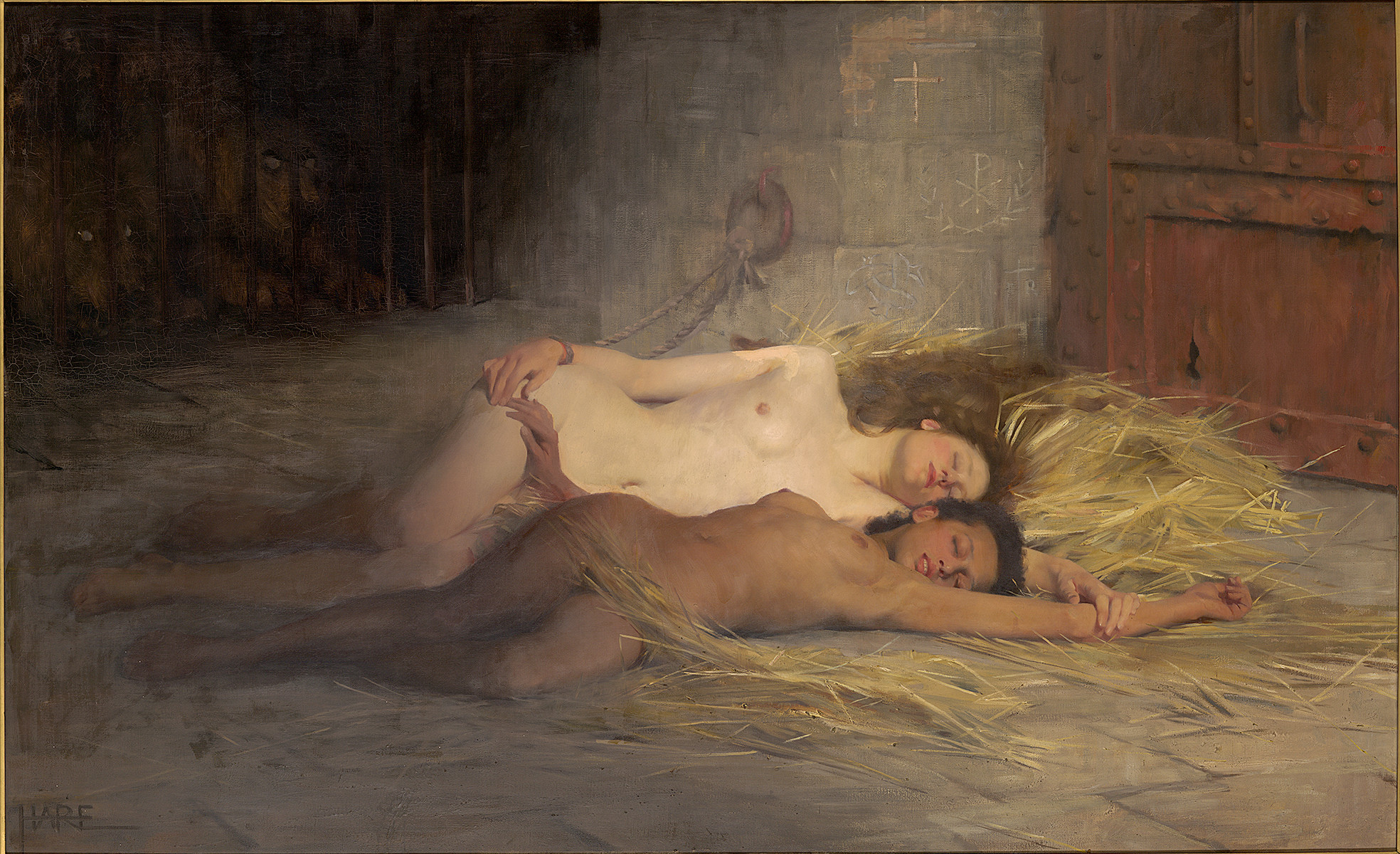
The Victory of Faith by Saint George Hare has been described by Kobena Mercer as depicting an interracial lesbian couple, likening it to Les Amis by Jules Robert Auguste.

A poem by Flann Mainistrech claims that the goddess Áine died of love for Banba, but rather than a lesbian lover, Banba may be a personification of Ireland. St. Brigid of Kildare, who died in the 6th century, may have had a lesbian relationship with Darlughdacha, a nun with whom she shared a bed.

An early story about Irish lesbianism involves the 8th-century king Niall Frossach and is recorded in the Book of Leinster. A woman has given birth to a child without having had sex with a man, and the king must explain how this has happened:

The king was silent then. 'Have you had playful mating with another woman?', said he, 'and do not conceal it if you have'. 'I will not conceal it', said she; 'I have'. 'It is true...', said the king. 'That woman had mated with a man just before, and the semen which he left with her, she put into your womb in the tumbling, so that it was begotten in your womb. That man is the father of your child, and let it be found out who he is'.

The story uses the term lánamnas rebartha, or "playful mating," to refer to lesbian sex.

The Old Irish Penitential is a penitential written in Old Irish from before the end of the 8th century. It specified the same punishment for men who have intercrural or anal sex as for "women or girls who do the same thing among themselves." The punishment was two years of penance.

Lady Frances Brudenell, Countess of Newburgh, was an Irish aristocrat known as the subject of a satire in which she was portrayed as the leader of a society of lesbians.

=== Wales ===
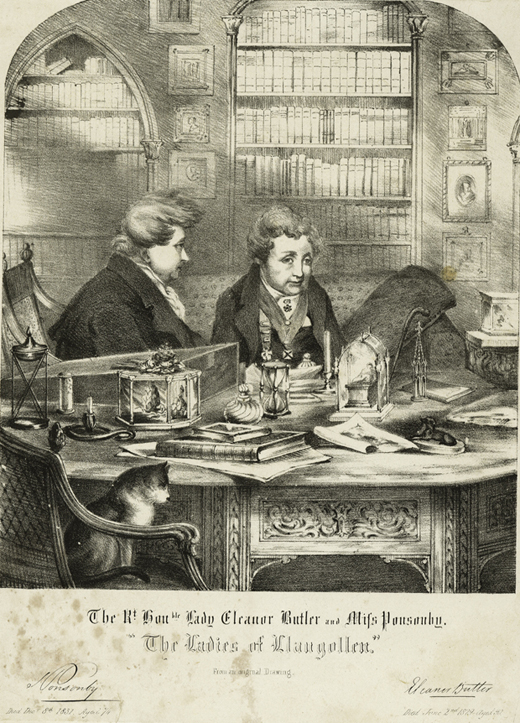
The Ladies of Llangollen, Eleanor Butler and Sarah Ponsonby.

Eleanor Butler and Sarah Ponsonby were nicknamed the Ladies of Llangollen. In 1778, Butler and Ponsonby eloped from Ireland to live together in Wales for 51 years, where they were later thought of as eccentrics. The elopement came as a relief to Ponsonby's family, who were concerned about their reputation had she run away with a man.

Butler and Ponsonby's story was considered "the epitome of virtuous romantic friendship" and inspired poetry by Anna Seward and Henry Wadsworth Longfellow.

== Latin America ==
=== Aztec Empire ===
The Florentine Codex, an encyclopedic work on the Aztec and other peoples of Central America finished in 1577, contains a section on Aztec homosexuality. Book ten of the Codex covers both male and female sexuality. It describes Aztec lesbians as masculine in appearance and behavior and never wishing to be married.

The context of the Classical Nahuatl term xōchihuah ("owner of flowers") seems to denote a "homosexual of either sex." Another word, patlācheh, seems to refer specifically to a lesbian in the Florentine Codex. Juan de Torquemada's book Monarquía indiana, published in 1615, defines this word and briefly mentions the persecution of Aztec lesbians: "The woman, who with another woman had carnal pleasures, for which they were called Patlache, which means: female incubus, they both died for it." (Note: "La muger, que con otra muger tenía deleitaciones carnales, a las quales llamaban Patlache, que quiere decir: incuba, morían ambas por ello." (Monarquía indiana, transl.))Alonso de Molina uses a verb grammatically related to patlācheh to refer to having lesbian sex.

There is no evidence that homosexuality was actively suppressed until after the Spanish Conquest.

=== Post-Colonial Latin America ===
In Latin America, lesbian subcultures increased as countries transitioned to or reformed democratic governments. However, social harassment has remained common even in places where homosexuality is legal. Laws against child corruption, or promoting morality or "the good ways" (faltas a la moral o las buenas costumbres), have been used to persecute homosexuals. Lesbian groups and advocacy have faced repression in many countries where dictators have seized power, including Argentina.

The meetings of feminist lesbians of Latin America and the Caribbean have been an important forum for the exchange of ideas for Latin American lesbians since the late 1980s. With rotating hosts and biannual gatherings, their main aim is the creation of communication networks in order to change the situation of lesbians in Latin America (both legally and socially), to increase solidarity between lesbians, and to destroy the existing myths about them.

=== Argentina ===
Argentina was the first Latin American country with a gay rights group, Nuestro Mundo (NM, or Our World), created in 1969. Six mostly secret organizations concentrating on gay or lesbian issues were founded around this time, but persecution and harassment were continuous and grew worse with the dictatorship of Jorge Rafael Videla in 1976, when all groups were dissolved in the Dirty War. Lesbian rights groups have gradually formed since 1986, aiming to build a cohesive community that overcomes philosophical differences with heterosexual women.

=== Brazil ===
Felipa de Souza (1556–1600) had romantic relationships with other women during the Brazilian colonial era. She was accused of sodomy, and was persecuted by the Catholic Inquisition.

=== Chile ===
In Chile, the dictatorship of Augusto Pinochet forbade the creation of lesbian groups until 1984. In 1984, Ayuquelén ("joy of being" in Mapuche) was founded, prompted in part by the very public beating death of Mónica Briones, amid shouts of "Damned lesbian!" from her attacker.

The lesbian movement is closely associated with the feminist movement in Chile, although the relationship has sometimes been strained. Ayuquelén worked with the International Lesbian Information Service, the International Lesbian, Gay, Bisexual, Trans and Intersex Association, and the Chilean gay rights group Movimiento de Integración y Liberación Homosexual (Movement to Integrate and Liberate Homosexuals) to remove the sodomy law in Chile.

=== Mexico ===
Juana Inés de la Cruz (1648–1695) was a prolific scholar, poet, writer, and protofeminist known for her searing critiques of misogyny. She also "addressed to three vicereines more than forty passionate, often playful, love poems." The romantic nature of these poems has been debated by scholars for decades, but Amanda Powell argues that non-romantic readings of de la Cruz's work stem from historical and modern assumptions of heterosexuality. De la Cruz's Redondilla 87, which rapturously extols the qualities of a woman named "Feliciana," can be read in a homoerotic manner.

In 1977, Lesbos, the first lesbian organization for Mexicans, was formed. Several incarnations of political groups promoting lesbian issues have since evolved; as of 1997, 13 lesbian organizations were active in Mexico City. Lesbian associations are said to have had little influence on homosexual and feminist movements.

=== Nicaragua ===
Lesbian consciousness became more visible in Nicaragua in 1986, when the Sandinista National Liberation Front expelled gay men and lesbians from its midst. State persecution prevented the formation of associations until AIDS became a concern, when educational efforts forced sexual minorities to band together. The first lesbian organization was Nosotras, founded in 1989. An effort to promote visibility from 1991 to 1992 provoked the government to declare homosexuality illegal in 1994, effectively ending the movement until 2004, when Grupo Safo – Grupo de Mujeres Lesbianas de Nicaragua was created, four years before homosexuality became legal again.

== North America ==
=== Indigenous North America ===
==== Traditional roles ====
Some Indigenous peoples of the Americas conceptualize a third gender, referred to with the umbrella term two-spirit. This term can include women who dress as, and fulfill the roles usually filled by, men in their cultures. In other cases they may use different terms for feminine women and masculine women. These identities are rooted in the context of the ceremonial and cultural lives of the particular Indigenous cultures; "simply being gay and Indian does not make someone a Two-Spirit." Two-spirit ceremonial and social roles are conferred and confirmed by the person's elders, and "do not make sense" when defined by non-Native concepts of sexual orientation and gender identity. Rather, they must be understood in an Indigenous context.

As an example, the Mohave traditionally had a role known as 'hwame'. Hwame was a social role, sometimes ceremonially initiated, always discouraged, and associated with shamanism. It was taken on either before a woman began menstruating or after childbirth. In some regards, hwame were treated as men -- they wore breech-cloth, did men's work, were called 'he', and took on a penetrative role during sex. In other ways, they differed -- they did not typically go to war, were vulnerable to rape, and did not engage in fights with men -- and were not genuinely believed to be men. The concept differs from lesbianism in the association with occupation and sometimes by ceremony; in addition, a hwame and his wife were considered of different natures. The wife was considered to be like any other woman and to have a choice, and she was usually teased for partnering with a hwame. The hwame was considered of an intractable cross-sex temperament.

==== Legal status ====
In both the past and in modern day, tribal law can differ significantly from colonial law, and from tribe to tribe–– including on the issue of same-sex marriage.

For example, the Navajo Nation's Diné Marriage Act of 2005, which bans recognition of same-sex marriages performed outside the Nation, remains in place as of 2025 despite ongoing disputes. Thirteen other tribal law codes (e.g. Suquamish, Puyallup, and Mashantucket Pequot Nations) affirmatively allow same-sex marriage. Other tribal law codes (e.g. Cheyenne, Arapaho) were written with sex-neutral language, leading to a default acceptance of same-sex marriages.

=== United States ===
==== 17th and 18th centuries ====
In colonial American history, laws against lesbianism were suggested but not created or enforced. In 1636, John Cotton proposed a law which would make sex between two women (or two men) in Massachusetts Bay a capital offense, but the law was not enacted. It would have read, "Unnatural filthiness, to be punished with death, whether sodomy, which is carnal fellowship of man with man, or woman with woman, or buggery, which is carnal fellowship of man or woman with beasts or fowls." In 1655, the Connecticut Colony suggested a law against sodomy between women (as well as between men), but it did not take effect.

However, in 1649 in Plymouth Colony, Sarah White Norman and Mary Vincent Hammon were prosecuted for "lewd behavior with each other upon a bed." Their trial documents are the only known record of sex between female English colonists in North America in the seventeenth century. Hammon was only admonished, perhaps because she was under sixteen, but in 1650 Norman was convicted and required to publicly acknowledge her "unchaste behavior" with Hammon. She was also warned against future offenses. This is the only known example of the prosecution of female homosexual activities in United States history.

Deborah Sampson fought in the American Revolution under the name Robert Shurtlieff, and pursued relationships with women.

In 1779, Thomas Jefferson proposed a law stating that "Whosoever shall be guilty of rape, polygamy, or sodomy with man or woman shall be punished, if a man, by castration, if a woman, by cutting thro' the cartilage of her nose a hole of one half inch diameter at the least", but the proposal failed.

==== 19th century ====
Close intimate relationships were common among women in the mid-nineteenth century. This was attributed to strict gender roles that led women to expand their social circle to other women for emotional support. These relationships were expected to form close between women with similar socioeconomic status. Since there was not defined language in regards to lesbianism at the time, these relationships were seen as merely homosocial. Though women developed very close emotional relationships with one another, marriage to men was still the norm. However, there is evidence of possible sexual relationships beyond an emotional level. Documents from two African-American women describe practices known as "bosom sex." While these women practiced heterosexuality with their husbands, it is believed that their relationship was romantic and sexual.

The late nineteenth century and early twentieth century saw the flourishing of "Boston marriages" in New England. The term describes romantic friendship between two women, living together without any financial support from men. Many lasting romantic friendships began at women's colleges. This kind of relationship actually predates the New England custom, as there have been examples of this in the United Kingdom and continental Europe since the seventeenth century. Belief in the platonic nature of Boston marriages began to dissipate after followers of Freud cast suspicion on the supposed innocent friendships of the "marriages."

Poet Emily Dickinson (1830–1886) wrote over 300 letters and poems to Susan Gilbert, who later became her sister-in-law, and later engaged in romantic correspondence with Kate Scott Anthon.

Freeborn Black women Addie Brown and Rebecca Primus left evidence of their passion in letters: "No kisses is like youres." They wrote openly of their sexual affection for one another, and despite their working-class economic status their writings survived, both of which are unusual for the time.

In Georgia in 1870, schoolteacher Alice Baldy wrote to her college friend Josie Varner, "Do you know that if you touch me, or speak to me there is not a nerve of fibre in my body that does not respond with a thrill of delight?"

==== Early 20th century ====
In the early 1900s at Mount Holyoke College, unmarried professor Jeannette Augustus Marks lived with the college president, Mary Woolley, for 36 years. Even while unmarried and living with a woman, Marks discouraged young women from "abnormal" friendships and insisted happiness could only be attained with a man. (Note: Other historical figures rejected being labeled as lesbians despite their behavior: Djuna Barnes, author of Nightwood, a novel about an affair Barnes had with Thelma Wood, earned the label "lesbian writer", which she protested by saying, "I am not a lesbian. I just loved Thelma." Virginia Woolf, who modeled the hero/ine in Orlando on Vita Sackville-West, with whom she was having an affair, set herself apart from women who pursued relationships with other women by writing, "These Sapphists love women; friendship is never untinged with amorosity.")

The 1920s was a decade of social experimentation, particularly with sex. This was heavily influenced by the writings of Sigmund Freud, who theorized that sexual desire would be sated unconsciously, despite an individual's wish to ignore it. Freud said that most people have phases of homosexual attraction or experimentation, but attributed exclusive same-sex attraction to stunted development resulting from trauma or parental conflicts. (Note: A 1966 survey of psychological literature on homosexuality began with Freud's 1924 theory that it is a fixation on the opposite sex parent. As Freud's views were the foundation of psychotherapy, further articles agreed with this, including one in 1951 that asserted that homosexuals are actually heterosexuals that play both gender roles, and homosexuals are attempting to perpetuate "infantile, incestuous fixation(s)" on relationships that are forbidden.)

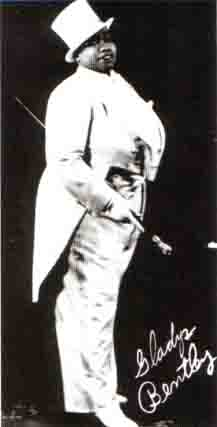
Harlem resident Gladys Bentley was renowned for her blues songs about her affairs with women.

In large cities that provided a nightlife, women began to seek out sexual adventure. No location saw more visitors for its possibilities of homosexual nightlife than Harlem, the predominantly African American section of New York City. White "slummers" enjoyed jazz and nightclubs. Blues singers Ma Rainey, Bessie Smith, Ethel Waters, and Gladys Bentley openly sang about affairs with women. Homosexuals began to draw comparisons between their newly recognized minority status and that of African Americans. Among African American residents of Harlem, lesbian relationships were common and tolerated, though not overtly embraced. Some women staged lavish wedding ceremonies, even filing licenses using masculine names with New York City. Most homosexual women were married to men and participated in affairs with women regularly.

Across town, Greenwich Village also saw a growing homosexual community; both Harlem and Greenwich Village provided furnished rooms for single men and women, which was a major factor in their development as centers for homosexual communities. The Village attracted Bohemian intellectuals who rejected Victorian ideals. Homosexuals were predominantly male, although figures such as poet Edna St. Vincent Millay and social host Mabel Dodge were known for their affairs with women and promotion of tolerance of homosexuality.

Women in the U.S. who could not visit Harlem or live in Greenwich Village were first able to visit saloons in the 1920s without being considered prostitutes. The existence of a public space for women to socialize in bars that catered to lesbians "became the single most important public manifestation of the subculture for many decades", according to historian Lillian Faderman.

==== Great Depression ====
The primary component necessary to encourage lesbians to publicly seek out other women was economic independence, which virtually disappeared in the 1930s with the Great Depression. Independent women in the 1930s were generally seen as holding jobs that men should have. Most lesbians in the U.S. found it necessary to marry men, engaging either in traditional marriages or "front" marriages to a gay man where both could discreetly pursue homosexual relationships.

The hostile social attitude led to the formation of small, close-knit, bar-centric communities in large cities. Women in other locales typically remained isolated. Speaking of homosexuality in any context was socially forbidden. Slang terms referred to openly gay people as "in the Life". (Note: Historian Vern Bullough published a paper based on an unfinished study of mental and physical traits performed by a lesbian in Salt Lake City during the 1920s and 1930s. The compiler of the study reported on 23 of her colleagues, indicating there was an underground lesbian community in the conservative city. Bullough remarked that the information was being used to support the attitude that lesbians were not abnormal or maladjusted, but it also reflected that women included in the study strove in every way to conform to social gender expectations, viewing anyone who pushed the boundaries of respectability with hostility. Bullough wrote, "In fact, their very success in disguising their sexual orientation to the outside world leads us to hypothesize that lesbianism in the past was more prevalent than the sources might indicate, since society was so unsuspecting.")

Eleanor Roosevelt, the First Lady from 1933 to 1945, exchanged rings with and wrote daily letters to journalist Lorena Hickok, expressing her love for Hickok, using endearments, and expressing a desire to kiss her.

Hollywood star Marlene Dietrich was bisexual, and used the term "sewing circle" to describe a network of sapphic actresses with whom she was involved. Ann Warner, Lili Damita, Claudette Colbert, and Dolores del Río were alleged to have been involved in Dietrich's "sewing circle." Dietrich was known to have had affairs with Frede and Mercedes de Acosta, and was rumoured to have dated Édith Piaf.

==== World War II ====
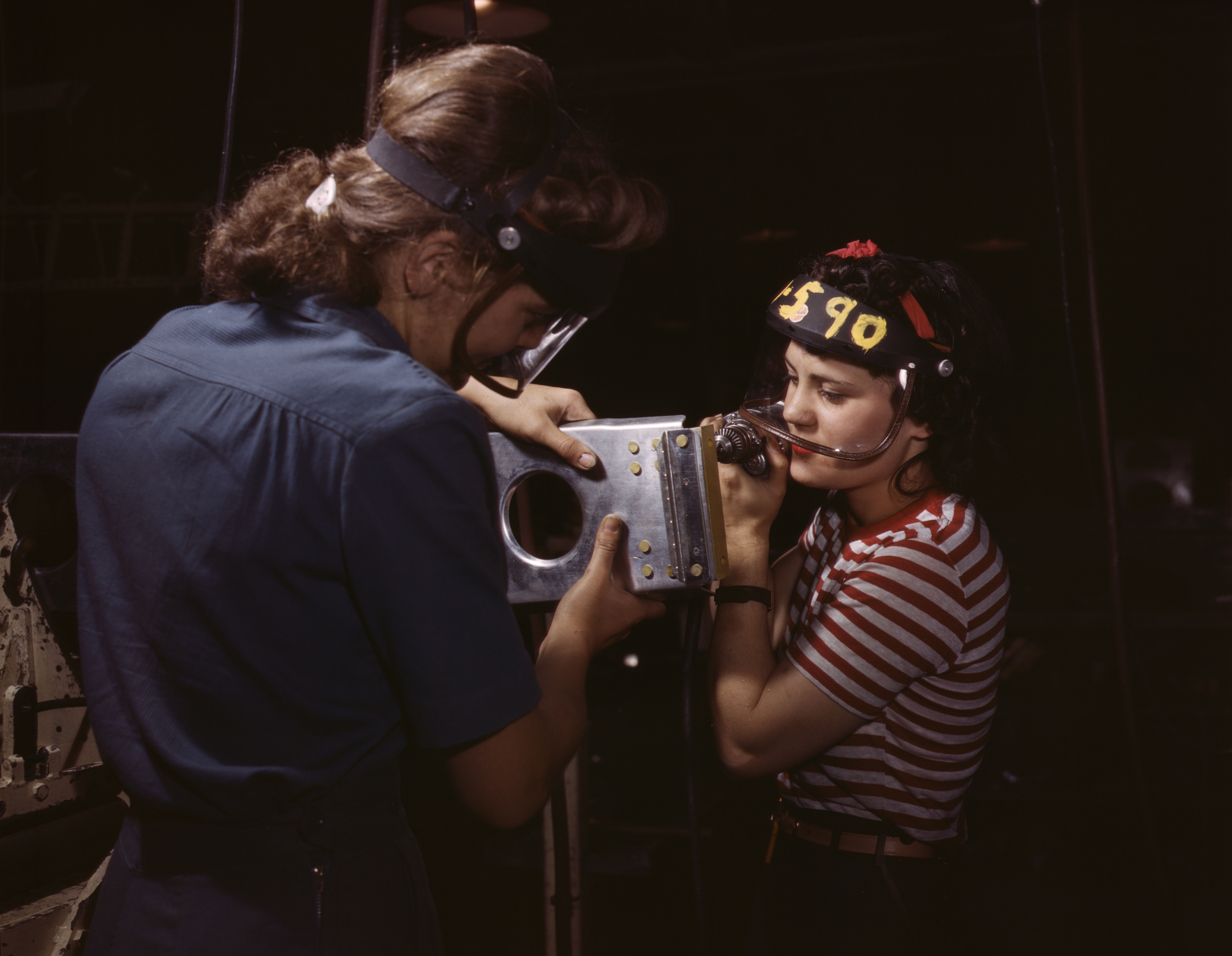
Women's experiences in the work force and the military during World War II gave them economic and social options that helped to shape lesbian subculture.

The onset of World War II caused a massive upheaval in people's lives as military mobilization engaged millions of men. Women were also accepted into the military in the U.S. Women's Army Corps (WACs) and U.S. Navy's Women Accepted for Volunteer Emergency Service (WAVES). Unlike processes to screen out male homosexuals, which had been in place since the creation of the American military, there were initially no methods for screening out lesbians; these were put into place gradually during World War II. Despite common attitudes regarding women's traditional roles in the 1930s, independent and masculine women were directly recruited by the military in the 1940s, and frailty was discouraged.

Some women arrived at the recruiting station in a man's suit, denied ever being in love with another woman, and were easily inducted. Sexual activity was forbidden and blue discharge was almost certain if one identified oneself as a lesbian. As women found each other, they formed into tight groups on base, socialized at service clubs, and began to use code words. Historian Allan Bérubé writes that homosexuals in the armed forces either consciously or subconsciously refused to identify themselves as homosexual or lesbian, and also never spoke about others' orientation.

The most masculine women tended to attract women interested in finding other lesbians. Women had to broach the subject about their interest in other women carefully, sometimes taking days to develop a common understanding without asking or stating anything outright.

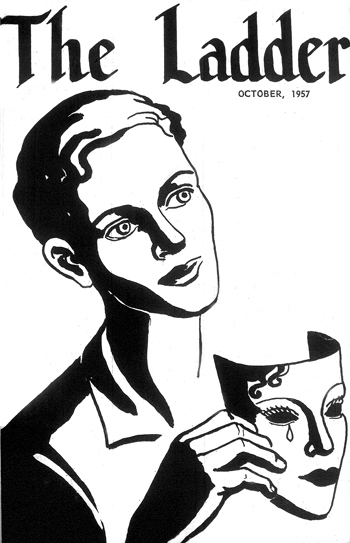
The 1957 first edition of The Ladder, mailed to hundreds of women in the San Francisco area, urged women to take off their masks.

Women who did not enter the military were aggressively called upon to take industrial jobs left by men, in order to continue national productivity. The increased mobility, sophistication, and independence of many women during and after the war made it possible for them to live without husbands, something that would not have been feasible under different economic and social circumstances, further shaping lesbian networks and environments.

==== 1950s ====
Following World War II, a nationwide movement pressed to return to pre-war society as quickly as possible. Partially due to increasing national paranoia about communism and the pervasiveness of psychoanalytic theory, the U.S. government began persecuting homosexuals around 1950. The government fired open homosexuals and began a widespread effort to gather intelligence about employees' private lives. The U.S. military and government conducted interrogations of women's sexual histories. State and local governments followed suit, arresting people for congregating in bars and parks, and enacting laws against cross-dressing for both sexes.

Concurrent with government persecution, in 1952, homosexuality was listed as a pathological emotional disturbance in the Diagnostic and Statistical Manual. The view that homosexuality was a curable sickness was widely believed in the medical community, general population, and among many lesbians themselves. Very little information is available about homosexuality during this period, beyond medical and psychiatric texts.

Community meeting places consisted of bars that were commonly raided by police, with those arrested exposed in newspapers. In response, eight women in San Francisco met in their living rooms in 1955 to socialize and have a safe place to dance. When they decided to make it a regular meeting, they became the first organization for lesbians in the U.S., titled the Daughters of Bilitis (DOB). In 1956, the DOB began publishing a magazine titled The Ladder. The Ladder was mailed to hundreds— eventually thousands— of DOB members and discussed the nature of homosexuality, sometimes challenging the idea that it was a sickness, with readers offering their own reasons as to why they were lesbians and suggesting ways to cope with the condition or society's response to it.

===== Pulp fiction =====
Despite a paucity of information about homosexuality in scholarly texts, fiction became a source for information about lesbianism. A paperback book titled Women's Barracks, describing a woman's experiences in the Free French Forces, was published in 1950. It told of a lesbian relationship the author had witnessed. After 4.5 million copies were sold, it was named in the House Select Committee on Current Pornographic Materials in 1952. Its publisher, Gold Medal Books, followed with the novel Spring Fire in 1952, which sold 1.5 million copies. Gold Medal Books was overwhelmed with mail from women writing about the subject matter, and followed with more books, creating the genre of lesbian pulp fiction.

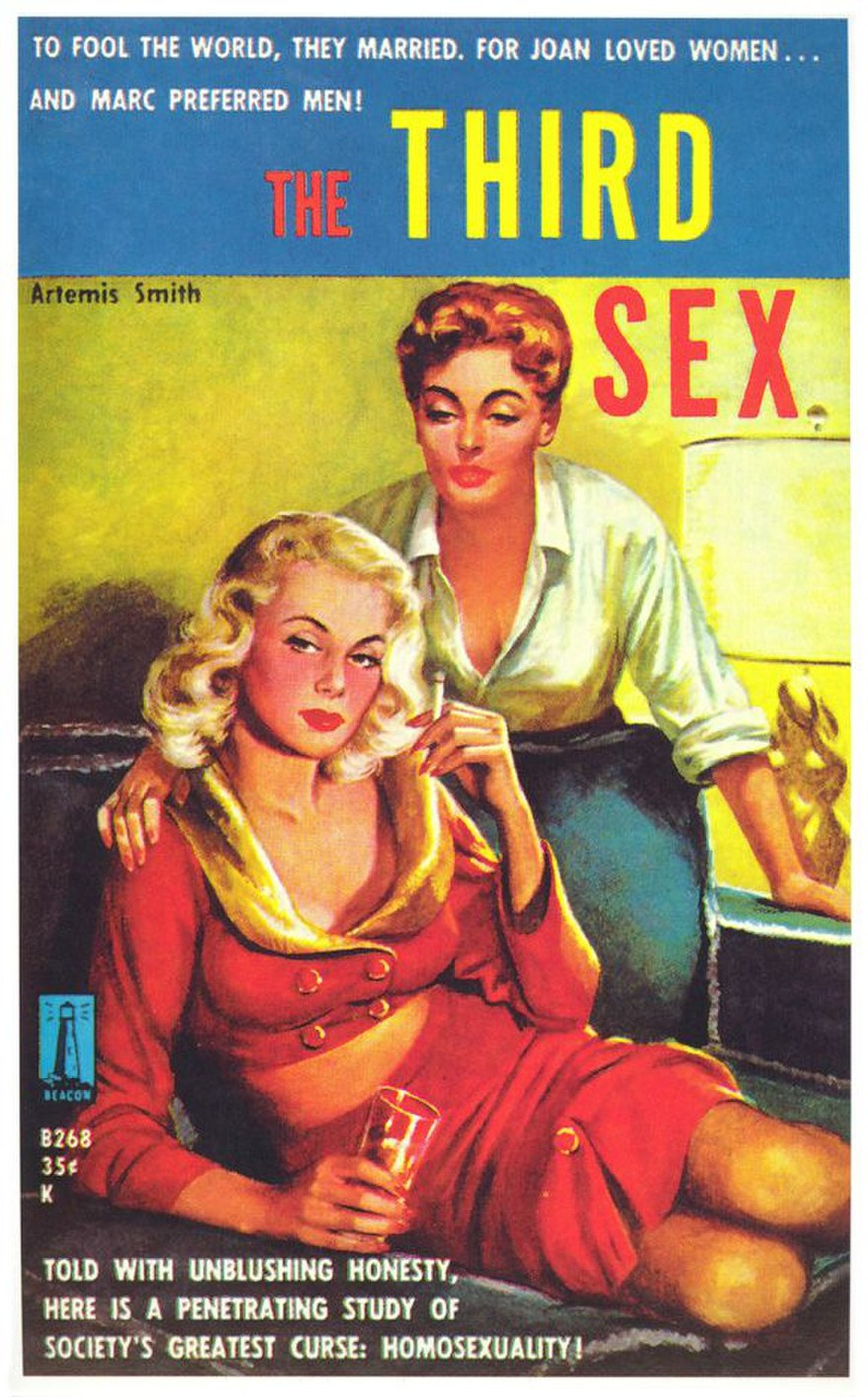
Though marketed to heterosexual men, lesbian pulp fiction provided an identity to isolated women in the 1950s.

Between 1955 and 1969, over 2,000 books were published using lesbianism as a topic, and they were sold in corner drugstores, train stations, bus stops, and newsstands all over the U.S. and Canada. Literary scholar Yvonne Keller has designated multiple sub-classes of lesbian pulp fiction to help highlight the differences between the types of pulp fiction being released. Virile adventures were written by authors using male pseudonyms, and almost all were marketed to heterosexual men. Pro-lesbian fiction focused on the relationship between the women, rather than sexually explicit material, defying the voyeuristic and homophobic nature of the "virile adventure" model. Only a handful of lesbian pulp fiction authors were women writing for lesbians, including Ann Bannon, Valerie Taylor, Paula Christian, and Vin Packer/Ann Aldrich.

The differences between virile adventures and pro-lesbian covers and titles were distinct enough that Bannon, who also purchased lesbian pulp fiction, later stated that women identified the material iconically by the cover art. Pro-lesbian covers were innocuous and hinted at their lesbian themes, and virile adventures ranged from having one woman partially undressed to sexually explicit covers that demonstrated the invariably salacious material within. Coded words and images were used on the covers. Instead of "lesbian," terms such as "strange," "twilight," "queer," and "third sex" were used in the titles. Many of the books used cultural references, naming places, terms, modes of dress, and other codes. As a result, pulp fiction helped to proliferate a lesbian identity simultaneously to lesbians and heterosexual readers.

==== Second-wave feminism (1960s to 1980s) ====
From the 1960s to the 1980s, the movement of second-wave feminism developed. The sexual revolution took place, and many women took advantage of their new social freedom to try new experiences. Women who previously identified as heterosexual tried sex with women, though many maintained their heterosexual identity.

Lesbianism as a political identity grew to describe a social philosophy among women, often overshadowing sexual desire as a defining trait. Different groups and authors defined "lesbian" as "the rage of all women condensed to the point of explosion," "a woman-identified woman who does not fuck men," or "a woman whose primary erotic, psychological, emotional and social interest is in a member of her own sex." Some women dubbed themselves lesbian-feminists. Under the lesbian-feminist framework, in the ideal society, named Lesbian Nation, "woman" and "lesbian" would be interchangeable terms.

Separatist feminists expressed their disdain with an inherently sexist and patriarchal society, and concluded the most effective way to overcome sexism and attain the equality of women would be to deny men any power or pleasure from women. Many believers strove to separate themselves physically and economically from traditional male-centered culture. As equality was a priority for lesbian-feminists, disparity of roles between men and women or butch and femme were viewed as patriarchal. Lesbian-feminists also eschewed the perceived chauvinism of gay men; many lesbian-feminists refused to work with men, or take up their causes.

Not all lesbians aligned with this movement. Lesbian-feminism was youth-oriented, and its predominantly college-educated proponents, who often had experience organizing around New Left and radical causes, had not seen any success in persuading radical organizations to take up women's issues. Many older lesbians who had acknowledged their sexuality in more conservative times felt maintaining their ways of coping in a homophobic world was more appropriate. Lesbians who believed they were born homosexual, and used the descriptor "lesbian" to define sexual attraction, often considered the separatist opinions of lesbian-feminists to be detrimental to the cause of gay rights.

Key thinkers and activists in lesbian feminism of this period include Rita Mae Brown, Adrienne Rich, Audre Lorde, Marilyn Frye, and Mary Daly.

During this period, social movements to improve the standing of women, Black Americans, the poor, and gay men also became prominent. In 1970, the Daughters of Bilitis folded over an internal dispute over whether its cause should be feminism or gay rights issues.

The gay rights movement and the feminist movement connected after a violent confrontation in New York City, the 1969 Stonewall riots. The Stonewall Riots were a series of spontaneous demonstrations, in which members of the LGBT community fought back when police became violent during a police raid in the early morning hours of June 28, 1969, at the Stonewall Inn in Greenwich Village, Manhattan, New York City. The crowd was spurred to action when butch lesbian Stormé DeLarverie punched the police officer who had struck her over the head, and called out to the crowd, "Why don't you guys do something?" These riots are widely considered to constitute the single most important event leading to the gay liberation movement in the US.

On December 15, 1973, the American Psychiatric Association voted almost unanimously to remove "homosexuality" from the list of psychiatric disorders included in the group's Diagnostic and Statistical Manual of Mental Disorders. This reversal came after three years of protests from gay and lesbian liberation activists and major disruption at the group's panel on homosexuality in 1970.

In the 1970s, as social attitudes became more permissive, lesbians began to publish their coming out stories. They also began publishing biographies of lesbian writers who were misplaced in history, and founding explicitly lesbian social and business enterprises. Olivia Records, a record label run by lesbians and focused on producing female musicians, was founded in 1973. Its sister company, Olivia Travel, remains operational to the present day and offers cruises and other vacations to lesbians. Lesbian communes, also known as womyn's land, became more common among cisgender lesbians espousing radical feminist or lesbian separatist philosophies. In Southern Oregon, for example, Oregon Women's Land Trust and dozens of other intentional communities were founded. Nearly Eugene, Oregon was known as a "lesbian mecca," with lesbians from across the country relocating to live among community.

Early debates over the inclusion of trans women in lesbian communities arose around the performance of Beth Elliot, a trans woman, at the West Coast Lesbian Conference in 1973, as well as around the inclusion of sound engineer Sandy Stone in Olivia Records.

==== Third-wave feminism (1980s to 2000s) ====
From 1974 to 1993, the organization Salsa Soul Sisters, today known as the African Ancestral Lesbians United for Societal Change, emerged as a lesbian womanist organization in New York City.

In October 1980, the First Black Lesbian Conference was held, an outgrowth from the First National Third World Lesbian and Gay Conference.

In the 1980s, a significant movement rejected the desexualization of lesbianism by cultural feminists, causing a heated controversy called the feminist sex wars. Butch and femme roles returned, although not as strictly followed as they were in the 1950s. They became a mode of chosen sexual self-expression for some women in the 1990s. Once again, women felt safer claiming to be more sexually adventurous, and sexual flexibility became more accepted.

During the AIDS epidemic, lesbians formed and became involved in activist groups, both in solidarity with gay men and to highlight the impact on their own community. The San Diego Blood Sisters, among other groups, organized blood drives specifically on behalf of HIV/AIDS patients.

In the 1990s, lesbians like Melissa Etheridge became more prominent in popular music. Lesbian musicians Indigo Girls and Tracy Chapman performed at Lilith Fair, a traveling music festival featuring exclusively female artists. The festival was derisively nicknamed "Lesbopalooza" by male critics.

Likewise, the Queer New Wave movement in cinema included the release of numerous independent films by, for, and about lesbians, like Go Fish. Cheryl Dunye's film The Watermelon Woman features a lesbian sex scene that garnered conservative media attention and even Congressional complaints.

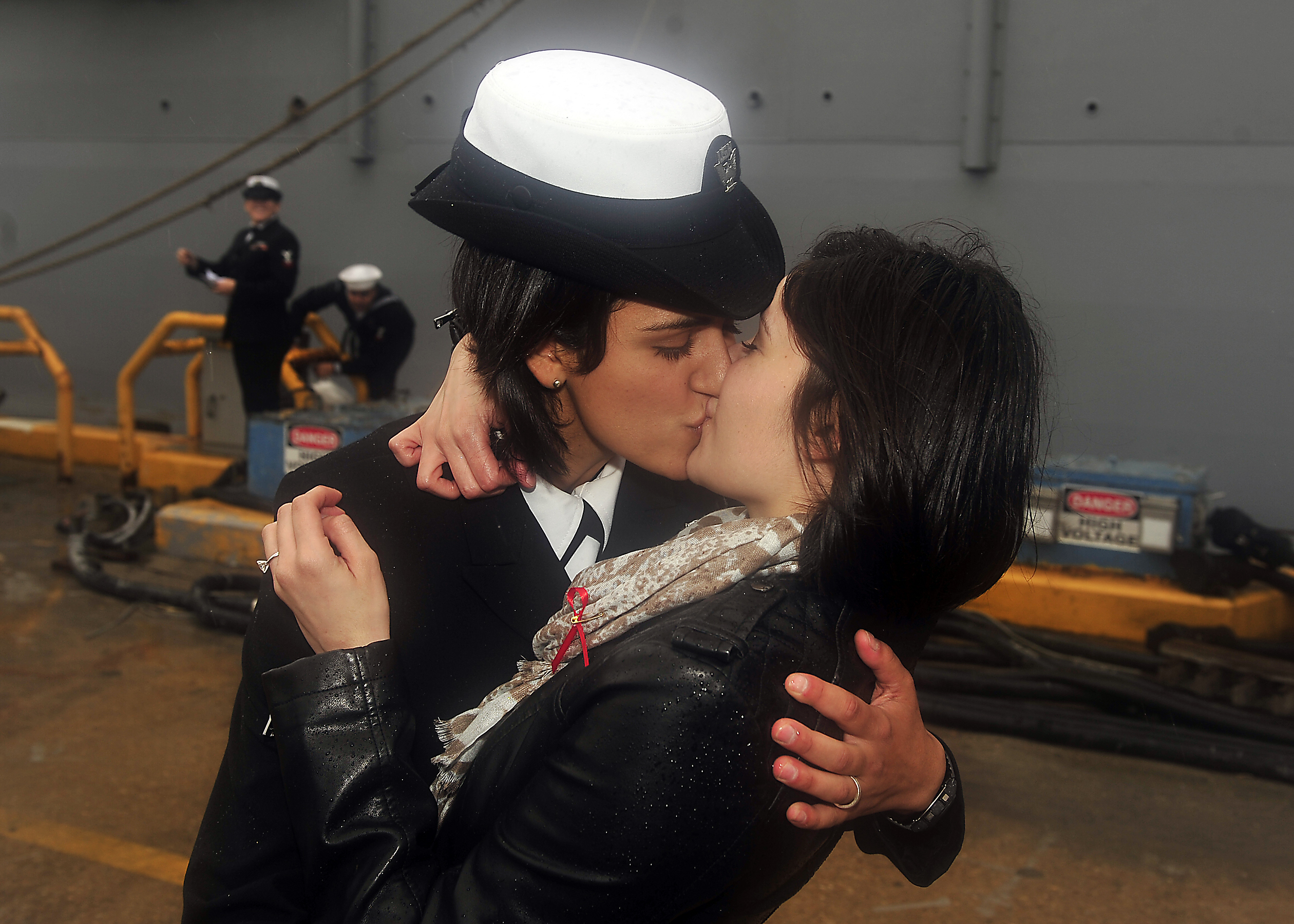
Two women in the US Navy who are in a relationship kiss in public upon meeting after a long time.

The Lesbian Avengers began in New York City in 1992 as "a direct action group focused on issues vital to lesbian survival and visibility." Dozens of other chapters quickly emerged worldwide, a few expanding their mission to include questions of gender, race, and class. Eloise Salholz, reporting on the 1993 March on Washington for Lesbian, Gay and Bi Equal Rights and Liberation, suggested that the Lesbian Avengers were so popular because they were founded at a moment when lesbians were increasingly tired of working on issues, like AIDS and abortion, while their own problems went unsolved. Most importantly, lesbians were frustrated with invisibility in society at large, and invisibility and misogyny in the LGBT community.

In 1997, Marxist political activist Angela Davis came out as a lesbian in an interview with Out magazine. In the same year, television star Ellen DeGeneres came out as a lesbian on the cover of Time magazine and, in her self-titled sitcom Ellen, portrayed the first openly gay character on American television.

In 2004, The L Word became the first TV show to feature an ensemble cast of lesbian and bisexual female characters.

== Oceania ==
=== Australia ===
==== Pre-colonial Aboriginal Australia ====
Many sources claim that, historically, Aboriginal Australians did not engage in homosexual behaviour, or that there are no records of such. In a 1994 essay titled "Peopling the Empty Mirror," the Gays and Lesbians Aboriginal Alliance unsettle this white Western historiography, writing:

There is a noticeable paucity of information about Aboriginal lesbianism, and Aboriginal women's sexuality in general, in the earlier literature. This is partly explained by the fact that most of the observers were male, and would therefore have had difficulty in gaining access to such information. But one is also left with the impression of a distinct androcentrism on the part of the observers, who seem to have regarded Aboriginal women and their sexuality as being, at best, of secondary interest.

The essay later details the few accounts of sexual relationships between Aboriginal women that do exist in extant historical sources, citing German anthropologist and missionary Carl Strehlow's Die Aranda-und Loritja-Stāmme in Zentral-Australien. Strehlow writes:

The unnatural vice of the women, woiatakerama (carried out using a little stick bound with string, called iminta [=Loritja: iminti], by two women, one of whom performs the role of the man), is practised by the eastern and western Aranda [and] occurs also among the western Loritja, the Yumu and Waiangara in the west, and among the Katitja, Ilpara, Warramunga etc., who live north of the McDonnell Ranges. The Loritja call this vice: nambia pungani.

Also cited is Hungarian-American anthropologist Géza Róheim's 1933 essay "Women and their Life in Central Australia," in which he describes the use of a yam root, instead of the iminta, and refers to "mutual onanism."'

==== Post-colonial Australia ====
Edward De Lacy Evans was born female in Ireland in the 1800s, but took a male name during a voyage to Australia and lived as a man for 23 years in Victoria, marrying women three times.

Danielle Scrimshaw writes that, "Britain’s sodomy laws were implemented in Australia at the beginning of colonisation in 1788. Interestingly, lesbianism was never considered an illegal act, and so the only queer individuals to be convicted – and consequently available to find within public records – were men."

In 1843, the Lieutenant Governor of Van Diemen's Land (now Tasmania) wrote that female convicts in Hobart had "their Fancy-women, or lovers, to who they are attached with as much ardour as they would be to the opposite sex, and practice onanism to the greatest extent."

In 2004, a group of gay rights activists founded a micronation called Gay and Lesbian Kingdom of the Coral Sea Islands. The "country" was established as a political protest against a government bill that passed in the Australian Parliament in September 2004 that re-codified a heterosexual definition of marriage.

=== New Zealand ===
In 1909, Percy Redwood, who had married a woman from Port Molyneaux, caused a scandal when she was found to be Amy Bock. Newspapers argued whether it was a sign of insanity or an inherent character flaw.

Auckland, New Zealand is home to what is noted as the only museum in the world dedicated to lesbian history, The Charlotte Museum. The museum aims to preserve collect and exhibit the histories, cultures, and experiences of lesbian and sapphic communities in New Zealand.

== Western frameworks of lesbianism ==
=== Romantic friendships ===
During the 17th through 19th centuries in the West, it was fashionable, accepted, and even encouraged for a woman to express passionate love for another woman. These relationships were termed romantic friendships, Boston marriages, or "sentimental friends." These relationships were documented by large volumes of letters written between women. Any sexual components of the relationships were not publicly discussed. Romantic friendships were promoted as alternatives to and practice for a woman's marriage to a man.

In a rare instance of sexuality being the focus of a romantic friendship, two Scottish schoolteachers in the early 19th century were accused by a student of visiting in the same bed, kissing, and making the bed shake. The student's grandmother reported the teachers to the authorities, who were skeptical that their actions were sexual in nature, or that they extended beyond the bounds of normal friendship: "Are we to say that every woman who has formed an intimate friendship and has slept in the same bed with another is guilty? Where is the innocent woman in Scotland?"

Around the turn of the 20th century, the development of higher education provided opportunities for women. In all-female surroundings, a culture of romantic pursuit was fostered in women's colleges. Older students mentored younger ones, called on them socially, took them to all-women dances, and sent them flowers, cards, and poems that declared their undying love for each other. These were called "smashes" or "spoons", and they were written about quite frankly in stories for girls aspiring to attend college in publications such as Ladies Home Journal, a children's magazine titled St. Nicholas, and a collection called Smith College Stories, without negative views. Enduring loyalty, devotion, and love were major components to these stories, and sexual acts beyond kissing were consistently undescribed.

Faderman calls this period "the last breath of innocence" before 1920 when characterizations of female affection were connected to sexuality, marking lesbians as a unique and often unflatteringly portrayed group. Specifically, Faderman connects the growth of women's independence and their beginning to reject strictly prescribed roles in the Victorian era to the scientific designation of lesbianism as a type of aberrant sexual behavior.

=== Sexology ===
In research on "inversion," German sexologist Magnus Hirschfeld categorized normal sexual behavior for men and women, and therefore categorized to what extent men and women deviated from these "ideal types." Sexologists Richard von Krafft-Ebing from Germany and Britain's Havelock Ellis wrote some of the earliest and most enduring categorizations of female same-sex attraction, approaching it as a form of insanity and debating whether change was possible.

The work of Krafft-Ebing and Ellis was widely read and helped to create public consciousness of female homosexuality. (Note: In Germany between 1898 and 1908 over a thousand articles were published regarding the topic of homosexuality. Between 1896 and 1916, 566 articles on women's "perversions" were published in the United States.) In the absence of any other material to describe their emotions, many homosexuals accepted the designation of different or perverted, and used their outlaw status to form social circles in Paris and Berlin. Lesbian began to describe elements of a subculture.

=== Butch and femme dichotomy ===
Early working-class lesbian subculture in the U.S. and Canada developed rigid gender roles. These roles dated back to Harlem and Greenwich Village in the 1920s. In this subculture, a couple was defined as "dichotomous individuals, if not male and female, then butch and femme". Although many municipalities enacted laws against cross-dressing, some women (butches) would socialize in bars dressed in men's clothing and mirroring traditional masculine behavior. Others (femmes) wore traditionally feminine clothing. Butch and femme modes of socialization were so integral within lesbian bars that women who refused to choose between the two would be ignored, and butch/butch or femme/femme romantic relationships were unacceptable.

By the 1950s and 1960s, the roles were pervasive and not limited to North America. From 1940 to 1970, butch/femme bar culture flourished in Britain, though there were fewer class distinctions than in lesbian communities in the U.S. Butch and femme roles were considered coarse by American lesbians of higher social standing during this period.

=== Lesbian separatism and lesbian sex wars ===
During the 1970s, emerging lesbian-feminist understandings of the lesbian potential in all women clashed with the minority-rights framework of the gay rights movement. Many women of the Gay Liberation movement felt frustrated at the domination of the movement by men and formed separate organizations. Some who felt gender differences between men and women could not be resolved developed "lesbian separatism," influenced by writings such as Jill Johnston's 1973 book Lesbian Nation. Disagreements between different political philosophies, in particular over views on sadomasochism, prostitution and transgenderism, were, at times, extremely heated and became known as the lesbian sex wars. Pro-sex feminists argued against anti-pornography feminists, contending that a new way for female desire to be advertised and demonstrated was needed.

=== Political lesbianism ===
Political lesbianism originated in the late 1960s among second-wave radical feminists as a way to fight sexism and compulsory heterosexuality, as detailed in Adrienne Rich's essay "Compulsory Heterosexuality and Lesbian Existence." Sheila Jeffreys, a lesbian, helped to develop the concept when she co-wrote "Love Your Enemy? The Debate Between Heterosexual Feminism and Political Lesbianism" with the Leeds Revolutionary Feminist Group. They argued that women should abandon support of heterosexuality and stop sleeping with men, encouraging women to rid men "from your beds and your heads." While the main idea of political lesbianism is to be separate from men, this does not necessarily mean that political lesbians have to sleep with women; some choose to be celibate or identify as asexual. The Leeds Revolutionary Feminist Group definition of a political lesbian is "a woman identified woman who does not fuck men." They proclaimed men the enemy and women who were in relationships with them collaborators and complicit in their own oppression. Heterosexual behavior was seen as the basic unit of the patriarchy's political structure, with lesbians who reject heterosexual behavior therefore disrupting the established political system. Lesbian women who have identified themselves as "political lesbians" include Ti-Grace Atkinson, Julie Bindel, Charlotte Bunch, Yvonne Rainer, and Sheila Jeffreys.

=== Lesbians of color ===
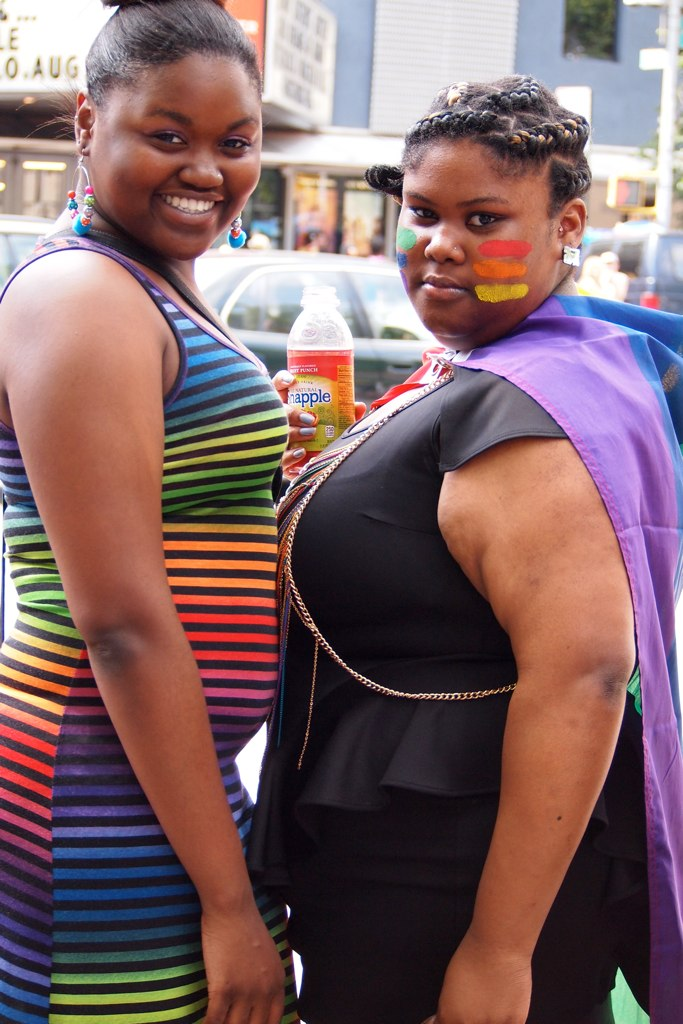
Attendees at 2012 New York City Pride parade

"Lesbians of color" is an umbrella term for Black, Latina, Asian, Arab, Native American, and other non-white lesbians. Lesbians of color have often been a marginalized group, and experience racism in addition to homophobia and misogyny.

Some scholars have noted that past lesbian communities were primarily white and American, and that lesbians of color have had difficulties integrating into these communities at large. Many lesbians of color have stated that they have been systematically excluded from lesbian spaces based on the fact that they are women of color. The early lesbian feminist movement was criticized for excluding race and class issues from their spaces and for a lack of focus on issues that did not benefit white women.

Additionally, lesbians of color face unique sets of challenges within their respective racial communities, as communities of color often view homosexuality as a "white" lifestyle and see the acceptance of homosexuality as a setback in achieving equality. Lesbians of color, especially those of immigrant populations, often hold the sentiment that their orientation adversely affects assimilation into the dominant culture. Within racial communities, the decision to come out can be costly, as the threat of loss of support from family, friends, and the community at large is probable. Lesbians of color are often exposed to a range of adverse consequences, including microaggressions, discrimination, and violence.

Audre Lorde, Barbara Smith, and Cherrie Moraga are cited as major theorists within the various lesbians of color movements for their insistence on inclusion and equality among both communities of color and white lesbian communities.

Lesbians of color are more likely to experience mental illness and psychological distress due to their intersecting experiences of sexism, racism, and homophobia. Mental health providers often use heteronormative standards to gauge the health of lesbian relationships, and the relationships of lesbian women of color are often subjects of judgment because they are seen as the most deviant.

== See also ==
- History of lesbianism in the United States
- List of lesbian, gay, bisexual, or transgender firsts by year
- Timeline of LGBT history
- Lesbian erasure
