= Li livres de jostice et de plet =

Li livres de jostice et de plet(z) ("The Book of Justice and of Pleas") is an Old French legal treatise compiled by the postglossators of the school of Orléans in the mid-thirteenth century (c. 1260). It was influenced by canon law (especially the decretals of Gregory IX), Roman law (especially the Digest), the customary law of the Orléanais, and the legislation of the Capetian Kings of France. It does not have the sense of a finished work, possesses lacunae, and is somewhat disorganised, being possibly the work of a student of the University of Orléans.

The first book of the Livres is a free translation of the first three paragraphs of the Digest. It is not a coutoumier (compilation of customary law) and most of the customary law it cites is limited to Orléans. Among the royal acts it reproduces is one of Saint Louis from 1254, in which the king depicted as judge declares himself the guardian of the peace and rest of his subjects: nos deserrens de la dete de la real poesté la pez et le respous de nos sojeiz. The Livres may have influenced the later legislation of Philip the Fair.

== Examples ==
Feudalism

With regards to the law of fiefs, the Livres states that dukes, counts, viscounts, and barons could all hold their land from one another. The Livres also states that la bone devise de droit des persones, des gens, est tele que tot homes ou il sont franc ou serf: "the good division of the law of persons is that all men are either free or servile." This law is based on the Digest but the meaning of the word servi that the medieval author translates "serf" meant "slave".

Laws of war

The Livres, by defining treason (traïson) as férir, et l'en ne voie pas le cop venir (to wound [someone], and when the blow could not be seen coming), declared all crossbowmen to be traitors, since nobody could see their blows coming.

Sexual crimes

The Livres has provided scholars with unique insight into medieval legal attitudes to sexual crimes. It does not lay out punishment for prostitutes, preferring to reintegrate them into society in accordance with canon law. It does, however, prescribe the banishment and confiscation of property of the maquerel des femmes (procurer) and the owner of a brothel (bordelerie). It also describes penalties for male homosexuality and is the first known work to describe penalties for lesbianism as well. On the first offence the male sodomite was to be castrated, on the second dismembered, and on the third burned alive. The lesbian offender was to be dismembered on the first two offences (although exactly what two "members" were to be cut off is uncertain) and burned alive on the third. All their goods accrued to the crown.

== Bibliography ==
Editions

- Pierre-Nicolas Rapetti and Polycarpe Chabaille, ed. Li livres de jostice et de plet. Paris: Firmin Didot, 1850. Based on the work of Henri Klimrath (1807-1837).

References

- Boswell, John (1981). Christianity, Social Tolerance, and Homosexuality: Gay People in Western Europe from the Beginning of the Christian Era to the Fourteenth Century. Chicago: University of Chicago Press.
- Donahue, Charles Jr. (1979). "What Causes Fundamental Legal Ideas? Marital Property in England and France in the Thirteenth Century." Michigan Law Review, 78:1 (November), pp. 59–88.
- Kim, Keechang (2000). Aliens in Medieval Law: The Origins of Modern Citizenship. Cambridge: Cambridge University Press. ISBN 0-521-80085-4.
- Krynen, Jacques (2000). "Entre science juridique et dirigisme: le glas médiéval de la coutume." Cahiers de recherches médiévales, 7.
- Otis, Leah Lydia (1985). Prostitution in Medieval Society: The History of an Urban Institution in Languedoc. Chicago: University of Chicago Press.
- Peralba, Sophie (2000). "Des coutumiers aux styles: l'isolement de la matière procéduraleaux XIIIe et XIVe siècles." Cahiers de recherches médiévales, 7.
- Reynolds, Susan (2001). Fiefs and Vassals: The Medieval Evidence Reinterpreted. Oxford: Clarendon Press. ISBN 0-19-820458-2.
- White, Stephen D. (2007). "Alternative Constructions of Treason in the Angevin Political World: Traïson in the History of William Marshal." e-Spania, 4 (December).
