= Wat Klang Bang Kaeo =

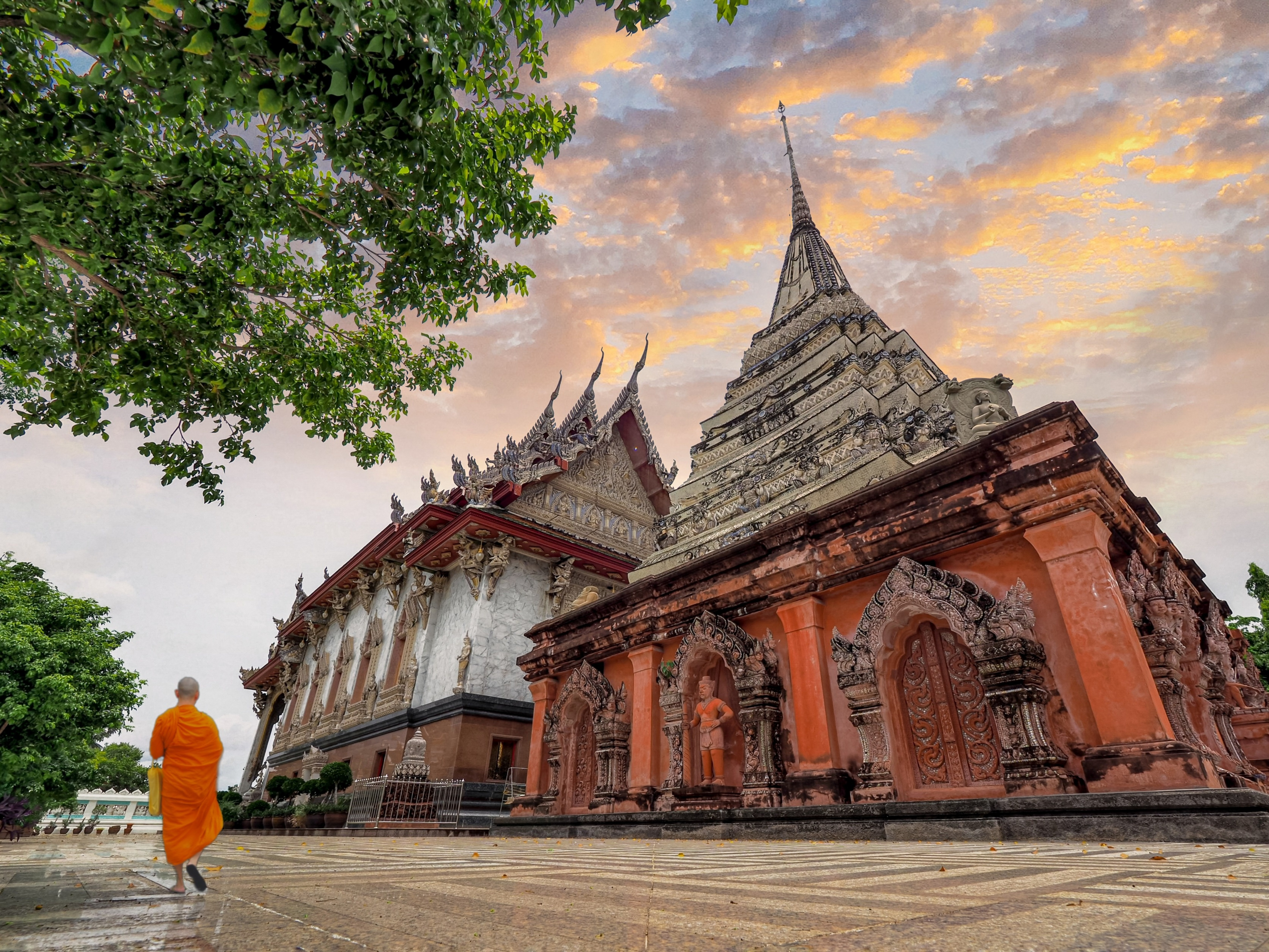

Religion
- District: Nakhon Chai Si District
- Province: Nakhon Pathom Province
- Region: Central Thailand

Location
- Country: Thailand
- Interactive map of Wat Klang Bang Kaeo
- Coordinates: 13.7953°N 100.1930°E

Wat Klang Bang Kaeo is a temple in Nakhon Chai Si District, Central Thailand. Located on the Tha Chin River, the temple was established during the Ayutthaya period.

== Description ==
The temple was built during the rule of the Ayutthaya Kingdom and was formerly known as Wat Khongkharam. The temple has three floors and contains Buddhist art and iconography.
