= Ildikó Juhász =

- Born: 1953 (age 71–72); Budapest, Hungary
- Other names: Ildi Juhász
- Occupation(s): cinema manager, restaurateur, activist
- Years active: 1970s–1990s

Ildikó Juhász (born 1953) is a Hungarian hospitality worker and lesbian activist most known for creating safe spaces for LGBT community members to gather during the socialist regime. She managed the Ipoly Cinema and after regular screenings invited lesbians to secretly gather for social events. Her after-hours events were the first to offer lesbians a public meeting space in Budapest. After the cinema closed and the regime changed, she opened the Rózsaszín csokornyakkendő (Pink Bowtie), a restaurant and nightclub, which she operated until 1999. In 2021, she was interviewed as a part of the Queer Memory Project, which aims to collect the history of the LGBT community in Hungary and what was formerly Czechoslovakia.

== Early life and education ==
Ildikó Juhász, known as Ildi, was born in Budapest, Hungary in 1953. She had a younger brother and grew up in an intellectual middle-class family. By the time she was fourteen or fifteen Juhász recognized her sexual orientation, but had no reference points to understand it until she met a fellow student who was gay and who introduced her to other homosexuals. When she came out to her family, they were not happy to learn she was a lesbian, but they accepted it. At the time, there was little information available in Hungary about same sex attraction and most of society viewed homosexuality as deviant. Juhász graduated from Eötvös Loránd University with a degree in philosophy and aesthetics.

== Career ==
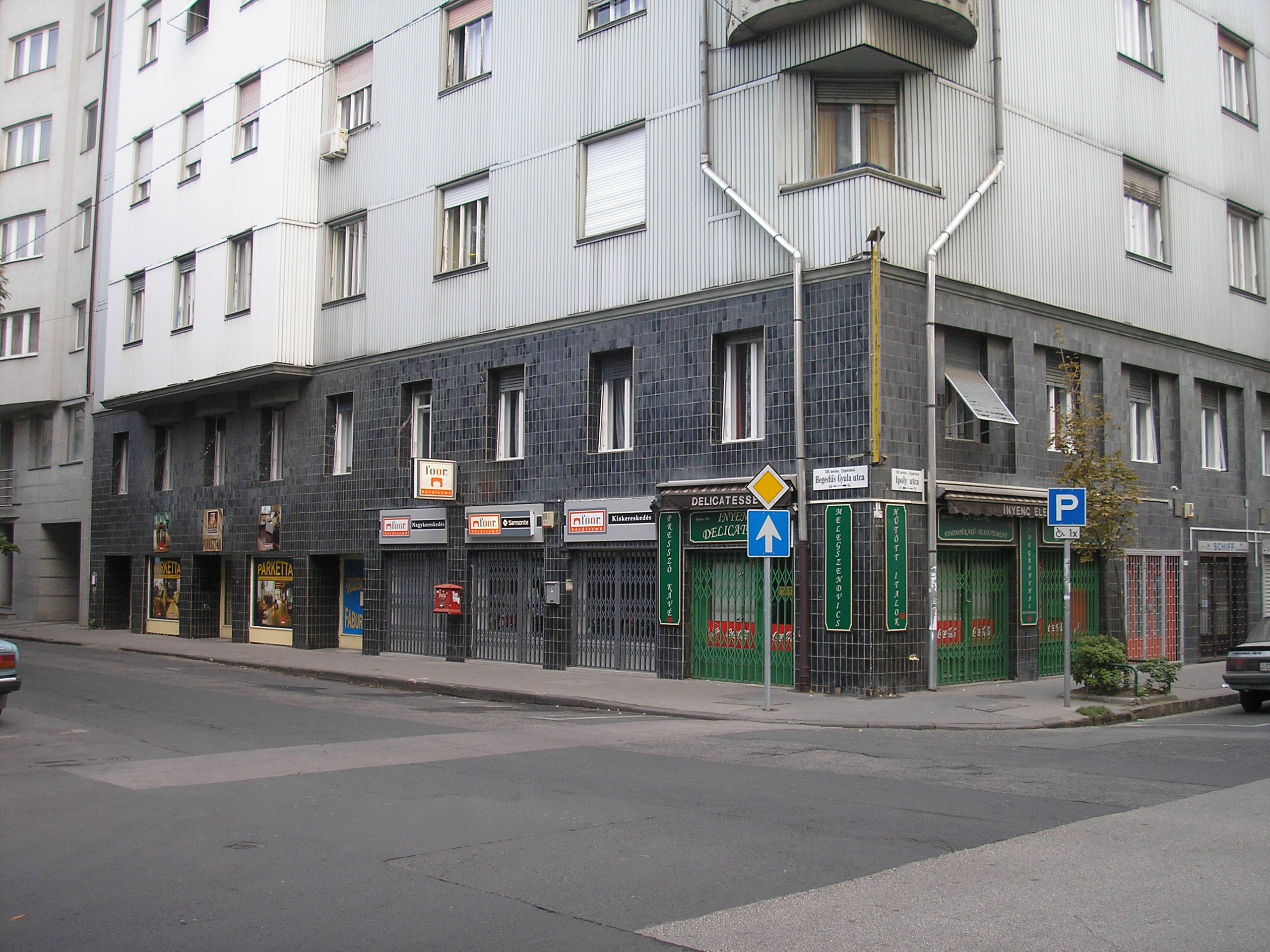
The former Ipoly Cinema building, circa 2007

After she graduated, Juhász began working in the hospitality industry. She was first employed as an assistant director and later as a manager in the nationalized Cinema Company. In the interwar period, all aspects of the Hungarian film industry from production and distribution to exhibition and cinema network management were taken over by the government. In the early 1980s, there were few places that were safe spaces for homosexuals to gather. The two primary social spaces were the Diófa restaurant and when that closed at midnight, an after-hours spot called the Egyetem cafe. There was no specific place for women to gather and as both the Diófa and Egyetem were well-known, police raids or taking down names of people who frequented the establishments was common. The state police, known as the MIAIII, routinely kept dossiers on homosexuals to monitor their activities.

By the mid-1980s Juhász was working at the Ipoly Cinema located in the Újlipótváros neighborhood on the corner of Ipoly and Hegedűs Gyula Streets, which since 1949 had been owned by the Hungarian Communist Party. Juhász began operating a clandestine meeting place for women after the film screening was done for the day. It was the first and for a long time, only place that catered solely to lesbians. The events were not advertised, but spread by word of mouth, and grew because of overlapping social circles which introduced new people to the crowd. She didn't charge for the Friday and Saturday night after-hours screenings, when she showed films with homosexual themes. Fridays were reserved for women, though if gay men showed up at the Ipoly, they were allowed to participate. On Saturdays the hidden bar of the Ipoly welcomed a mixed crowd after the regular theater screenings were completed.

If a film was not being shown the stage was sometimes open for drag shows or other performances, and on another floor typically there was space for music and dancing. Some of the parties were known to have up to eighty participants, but typically the crowd was forty to fifty people. The parties became legendary in the lesbian community and Juhása was seen as a community icon. Many of the lesbians who participated in the film and book project Eltitkolt évek: tizenhat leszbikus életút (Secret Years: Sixteen Lesbian Life Stories, 2011) reported the pivotal role Juhász played in creating lesbian networking opportunities through both the gatherings at the Ipoly and at private house parties.

In 1988, when Homéros, the first officially sanctioned homosexual association was registered, activists asked Juhász, even though she was not part of the organization, to organize their fundraising gala. Over three hundred people showed up. Based upon that success, five annual events were scheduled for Homéros. That same year, the Ipoly became the first cinema in Hungary to offer waitstaff service during showings. After the fall of communism in 1989, the 1990s saw many opportunities open up for businesses and allowing LGBTI people to begin living openly. In 1990, the Ipoly was sold and Juhász left the cinema. The following year, she opened her own restaurant and nightclub and the cinema reopened as the L'amour, the first pornographic movie house in Hungary.

The club, Rózsaszín csokornyakkendő (Pink Bowtie), operated at the beginning of Üllői Avenue between 1991 and 1999. Juhász continued to organize lesbian events to allow community members to organize and meet each other. When the gay Jewish group "Szidra" (Cider), which later changed its name to "Keshergay Magyar Zsidó" (Hungarian Jewish Gay Group), decided to organize in 1991, they met at the Pink Bowtie to found their association. Because her new business had to operate as a commercial enterprise and new freedoms had allowed other venues to open, Juhász did not attract the same crowds as previously, and she closed the business and retired in 1999. Juhász was interviewed in 2021 as a part of the Queer Memory Project, a group that focuses on collecting the history of the LGBT community in Hungary and what was formerly Czechoslovakia.
