= Warlpiri =

Warlpiri may refer to:

- Warlpiri people, an indigenous people of the Tanami Desert, Central Australia
- Warlpiri language, their language
