= Timeline of LGBTQ journalism =

The following is a timeline of lesbian, gay, bisexual, transgender and queer (LGBTQ) journalism history.

== 19th century ==
- 1869 – The term "homosexual" appears in print for the first time in a German-Hungarian pamphlet written by Karl-Maria Kertbeny (1824–1882).
- 1870 – The first LGBT-related periodical is established, Karl Heinrich Ulrichs Uranus, ceasing after one issue.
- 1896 – The second LGBT-related periodical is established, Adolf Brands Der Eigene.
- 1899 – The third LGBT-related periodical is established, Jahrbuch für sexuelle Zwischenstufen.

== 20th century ==
=== 1901–1909 ===
- Adolf Brand, the activist leader of the Gemeinschaft der Eigenen, working to overturn Paragraph 175, publishes a piece "outing" the imperial chancellor of Germany, Prince Bernhard von Bülow. The Prince sues Brand for libel and clears his name; Brand is sentenced to 18 months in prison.
- Harden-Eulenburg Affair in Germany.

=== 1910s ===
- 1913 – The word faggot is first used in print in reference to gays in a vocabulary of criminal slang published in Portland, Oregon: "All the fagots [sic] (sissies) will be dressed in drag at the ball tonight".
- 1919 – In Berlin, Germany, Doctor Magnus Hirschfeld co-founds the Institut für Sexualwissenschaft (Institute for Sex Research), a pioneering private research institute and counseling office. Its library of thousands of books was destroyed by Nazis in May 1933.
- 1919 – Different From the Others, one of the first explicitly gay films, is released. Magnus Hirschfeld has a cameo in the film and partially funded its production.
- 1919 Die Freundschaft is established, an LGBT-magazine which causes soon people throughout Germany getting united and organized.

=== 1920s ===
- 1924 – Die Freundin is established, world's first lesbian magazine.
- 1926 – Frauenliebe is established, world's second lesbian magazine.
- 1926 – Die BIF - Blätter Idealer Frauenfreundschaften is established, the world's first lesbian magazine run solely by women, edited by Selli Engler.
- 1926 – The New York Times is the first major publication to use the word "homosexuality".

=== 1930s ===
- 1932 - the first Swiss LGBT-periodical is established, Das Freundschaftsbanner. In 1942 it changes its title to Der Kreis.
- 1938 – The word gay is used for the first time on film in reference to homosexuality.
- 1939 – Frances V. Rummell, an educator and a teacher of French at Stephens College, published an autobiography under the title Diana: A Strange Autobiography; it was the first explicitly lesbian autobiography in which two women end up happily together. This autobiography was published with a note saying, "The publishers wish it expressly understood that this is a true story, the first of its kind ever offered to the general reading public".

=== 1940s ===
- 1940 – The first Dutch LGBT periodical ist established, Levensrecht. Due to the German occupation it has to pause after its first issue until 1946 and then continues until 1948.
- 1947 – Vice Versa, the first North American lesbian publication, is written and self-published by Lisa Ben (real name Edith Eyde) and distributed in Los Angeles.

=== 1950s ===
- 1952 – In Japan the male homosexual magazine Adonis is launched with the writer Mishima Yukio as a contributor.
- 1952 – In Los Angeles the male homosexual magazine "One" is published by the Mattachine Society.
- 1956 – The Ladder, the first nationally distributed lesbian publication in the United States, begins publication. It continues until 1970.
- 1957 – Homoerotic artist Tom of Finland first published on the cover of Physique Pictorial magazine from Los Angeles.
- 1958 – The United States Supreme Court rules in favor of the First Amendment rights of a gay and lesbian magazine, marking the first time the United States Supreme Court had ruled on a case involving homosexuality.

=== 1960s ===
- 1964 – Canada sees its first gay-positive organization, ASK, and first gay magazines: ASK Newsletter (in Vancouver), and Gay (by Gay Publishing Company of Toronto). Gay was the first periodical to use the term 'Gay' in the title and expanded quickly, including outstripping the distribution of American publications under the name Gay International. These were quickly followed by Two (by Gayboy (later Kamp) Publishing Company of Toronto).
- 1964 – The first photograph of lesbians on the cover of lesbian magazine The Ladder was done in September 1964, showing two women from the back, on a beach looking out to sea.
- 1965 – Everett George Klippert, the last person imprisoned in Canada for homosexuality, is arrested for private, consensual sex with men. After being assessed "incurably homosexual", he is sentenced to an indefinite "preventive detention" as a dangerous sexual offender. This was considered by many Canadians to be extremely homophobic, and prompted sympathetic articles in Maclean's and The Toronto Star, eventually leading to increased calls for legal reform in Canada which passed in 1969.
- 1966 – The first lesbian to appear on the cover of the lesbian magazine The Ladder with her face showing was Lilli Vincenz in January 1966.
- 1967 – The Advocate was first published in September as "The Los Angeles Advocate", a local newsletter alerting gay men to police raids in Los Angeles gay bars.
- 1967 – The book Homosexual Behavior Among Males by Wainwright Churchill breaks ground as a scientific study approaching homosexuality as a fact of life and introduces the term "homoerotophobia", a possible precursor to "homophobia"; The Oscar Wilde Bookshop, the world's first homosexual-oriented bookstore, opens in New York City.
- 1969 – Come Out! is established in New York City in November 1969 by the Gay Liberation Front. It stopped publishing in 1972.
- 1969 – Washington Blade is founded in Washington, D.C., as The Gay Blade with its first issue on October 5, 1969. It is the oldest continually operating LGBT newspaper in the United States.

=== 1970s ===
- 1971 – First issue of the newspaper Fag Rag is published by the Boston-based Fag Rag Collective. The last issue was published circa 1987.
- 1971 – The first issue of Lesbian Tide, a magazine created by younger, more radical members of the Daughters of Bilitis, is published, and continues until 1980.
- 1972 – A Quaker group, the Committee of Friends on Bisexuality, issued the "Ithaca Statement on Bisexuality" supporting bisexuals. The Statement, which may have been "the first public declaration of the bisexual movement" and "was certainly the first statement on bisexuality issued by an American religious assembly," appeared in the Quaker Friends Journal and The Advocate in 1972.
- 1974 – Elaine Noble becomes the second openly gay American elected to public office when she wins a seat in the Massachusetts State House; Inspired by Noble, Minnesota state legislator Allan Spear comes out in a newspaper interview; the Brunswick Four are arrested on 5 January 1974, in Toronto, Ontario. This incident of Lesbophobia galvanizes the Toronto Lesbian and Gay community; Also in 1974, the Lesbian Herstory Archives opened to the public in the New York apartment of lesbian couple Joan Nestle and Deborah Edel; it has the world's largest collection of materials by and about lesbians and their communities.
- 1975 – UK journal Gay Left begins publication.
- 1976 – Conditions: "a feminist magazine of writing by women with a particular emphasis on writing by lesbians", is founded in New York and features writing by Audre Lorde, Adrienne Rich, Paula Gunn Allen and others.
- 1976 – Lesbian magazine Sinister Wisdom begins publication in the United States, and becomes the longest running lesbian literary magazine in the country.
- 1977 – Welsh author Jeffrey Weeks publishes Coming Out.
  Original eight-color version of the LGBT pride flag
  Publication of the first issue of Gaysweek, NYC's first mainstream gay weekly.
- 1979 - Gai pied weekly magazine (hence the name Hebdo), French gay magazine, founded by Jean Le Bitoux. The magazine's name was suggested by philosopher Michel Foucault who wrote an article for the first issue. Among the magazine's collaborators were famous writers and philosophers: Yves Navarre, Tony Duvert, Gianni De Martino, Guy Hocquenghem, Renaud Camus. Considered the most iconic gay European magazine.

=== 1980s ===
- 1981 – Randy Shilts was hired as a national correspondent by the San Francisco Chronicle, becoming "the first openly gay reporter with a gay 'beat' in the American mainstream press."
- 1984 – On Our Backs, the first women-run erotica magazine and the first magazine to feature lesbian erotica for a lesbian audience in the United States, was first published in 1984 by Debi Sundahl and Myrna Elana, with the contributions of Susie Bright, Nan Kinney, Honey Lee Cottrell, Dawn Lewis, Happy Hyder, Tee Corinne, Jewelle Gomez, Judith Stein, Joan Nestle, and Patrick Califia.
- 1987 – The article "The Bisexual Movement: Are We Visible Yet?", by Lani Ka'ahumanu, appeared in the official Civil Disobedience Handbook for the March. It was the first article about bisexuals and the emerging bisexual movement to be published in a national lesbian or gay publication.
- 1988 GCN Magazine (Gay Community News), Ireland @gcn.ie

=== 1990 ===
- In April 1989, the American Society of Newspaper Editors released a survey of American newspaper journalists that noted the only newspaper in America to offer domestic partners benefits was the Village Voice. Because of the survey results, the Association of LGBTQ Journalists was created in 1990 to fight a "palpable undercurrent of bias" in mainstream news.
- The National Lesbian and Gay Journalists Association is founded in the United States.

=== 1993 ===
21 April - GAY45 was published and helped to free gay prisoners in Eastern Europe.

=== 1994 ===
- Susan Stryker's essay "My Words to Victor Frankenstein Above the Village of Chamounix" became the first article to be published in a peer-reviewed academic journal by an openly transgender author.

=== 1996 ===
- The Gay and Lesbian Medical Association launched the Journal of the Gay and Lesbian Medical Association, the world's first peer-reviewed, multi-disciplinary journal dedicated to LGBT health.

=== 1999 ===
- Steven Greenberg publicly came out as gay in an article in the Israeli newspaper Maariv. As he has a rabbinic ordination from the Orthodox rabbinical seminary of Yeshiva University (RIETS), he is generally described as the first openly gay Orthodox Jewish rabbi. However, some Orthodox Jews, including many rabbis, dispute his being an Orthodox rabbi.

== See also ==
- LGBTQ
- History of LGBTQ in policing
- LGBT literature
