= Käthe Reinhardt =

20th-century German lesbian activist

- Born: Katharina Erika Selma Reinhardt; 23 September 1896; Hansa Quarter, Berlin, German Empire
- Died: 28 June 1987 (aged 90); West Berlin, West Germany
- Other name: Kati

Käthe "Kati" Reinhardt, born Katharina Erika Selma Reinhardt (23 September 1896 – 28 June 1987), was a German activist in the lesbian movement. She was a formative figure in Berlin's lesbian subculture from the time of the Weimar Republic to the early 1980s as an organizer of clubs, balls, and meetings, and as a bar operator. In the 1920s she ran the largest clubs for the lesbian movement, which served up to 2,000 people, and worked, among others, with Charlotte “Lotte” Hahm.

== Early life ==
Käthe Reinhardt was born on 23 September 1896 at her parents' apartment at Claudiusstrasse 4 in the Hansa Quarter. Her parents were Max Reinhardt, a bank clerk, and Marie née Gassel. She grew up as part of the upper middle class. She had a brother, Walter, who was born in 1890. No further details about her childhood and youth are known.

== 1927 - 1932 ==
Reinhardt first came to public prominence at the beginning of 1927, after she published two poems in the lesbian magazine The Girlfriend. Shortly afterwards, she worked as an organizer for the “Monbijou Club”. The club founded in 1928 by the women's group of the German Friendship Association, one of the largest homosexual organizations in the Weimar Republic. Reinhardt was the leader of the club, which took place in the “Zauberflöte” at Kommandantenstrasse 72. In addition to regular large balls, the club hosted smaller events such as lectures. The club also organized bowling and hiking groups (which were led by Herta Laser) and a steamboat trip. According to the club's records, it had almost 2,000 members after one year of existence and over 15,000 visitors during the first year. The following was reported about the Christmas and New Year's Eve balls in 1928: "The events of the club were rarely of great success Women's Club 'Monbijou', in the 'Zauberflöte', Commandant Street 72, on Christmas holidays and New Year's Eve. Around 300 women showed up on Christmas Day to hand out Christmas presents […]. The New Year’s Eve celebration at the ‘Monbijou’ club was surprisingly well attended. Well over 400 women wanted to celebrate the New Year with like-minded people. Many left because there was no chance of getting a chair. [...] It was full of activity until 6 a.m".

Ruth Margarete Roellig dedicated a separate chapter to the club in her 1928 book, in which she wrote: "a lavishly colorful flood of light floods over the mostly youthful, slim female figures who are here harmless happiness at the "mirror dance", waltz or at the social tyrolienne. A special feature of the club is the very official distinction between "Bubis" - the masculine - and "Mädis" - the feminine women. This is the case with the popular bell dance, where the "Bubis" are alone Receive bells and use them to ring the bells for their girls. [...] Other male visitors are very unwelcome, people prefer to be among themselves. Despite its relative youth, the Monbijou club already enjoys a large following in the better circles of young girls [ ...] The highlight of these evenings is the wonderful play of lights, which is worth seeing - soon the large, beautiful hall is ablaze with purple, then green again, or it suddenly turns into a deep, rich red, in whose soft light the couples follow the sounds of the music."

The club's first foundation festival was scheduled for 31 August 1929. Two days earlier, the announcement came that Kati Reinhardt and the club were leaving the German Friendship Association, merging with the Violetta club under Lotte Hahm, which also belonged to the DFV, and joining together to form the DFV's larger competitor organization, the Bund für Menschrecht under Friedrich Radszuweit. According to Lotte Hahm, Carl Bergmann, the president of the DFV and the head of the women's group, was a heterosexual man who founded the women's club "only to exploit it for his personal purposes". Since Reinhardt carried out this move without considering the club's anchoring in the DFV, it is assumed that she also managed the club from a commercial perspective and had both the naming rights and the club's rental agreement in the Magic Flute. Selli Engler, who was still part of the DFV at the time but also switched to the BfM shortly afterwards, reported on an encounter between her and Reinhardt on the evening of the foundation party, at which Reinhardt insulted and verbally abused her, which was probably related to Engler's previous publications in which she had accused Reinhardt and Hahm of betrayal of the DFV and base motives.

The Association 1929 of the ladies' clubs Violetta and Monbijou organized three evenings a week in the Magic Flute. Around 500 women could be present at New Year's Eve balls; men were not allowed to enter. Outside of the Magic Flute evenings, the two clubs operated independently of each other. In addition to her organizational role, Reinhardt appeared regularly as a singer, and contemporary reports highlighted the quality of her singing. However, their events were not viewed entirely uncritically. In a review in 1976, Gertrude Sandmann commented cautiously and characterized the type of events as bourgeois and bourgeois, with a "preference for crooner music and hearty dancing in the large hall".

Unlike prominent representatives of the first lesbian movement such as Hahm or Engler, Reinhardt appeared neither as an author nor as an activist, but instead limited herself entirely to her work as an organizer. Reinhardt was extraordinarily popular; in 1931, the magazine The Girlfriend wrote that "as a magnificent person and artist, she knew how to win the hearts of all members".

== 1933 - 1945 ==
When the Magic Flute was closed by the National Socialists in 1933, Reinhardt's involvement was paused; unlike Lotte Hahm, there is no evidence of Reinhardt's organizing activities between 1933 and 1945.

The only report about Reinhardt from this time comes from police and Gestapo files from October 1935. At that time she reported to the police a ball of lesbian women in Friedrichshain, organized by the club “The Funny Nine” . As a result, the approximately 150 women who took part were monitored by the Gestapo; the denunciation probably had no direct consequences. It is not known why Reinhardt reported the event to the police, Schoppmann considers the possibility that it was not Reinhardt himself and that the denunciation was essentially foisted on her, or that Reinhardt may have been involved himself The police could have been targeted and was therefore under pressure.

== Post-war period ==
A few months after the end of the war, Reinhardt and her partner, Eva Kohlrusch, moved into a small apartment on Kulmbacher Strasse in Schöneberg. It is not known when the couple met. Kohlrusch was born Ewa Frydman in Warsaw in 1900 and was of Jewish origin. By moving to Berlin and dissolving her marriage in 1938, she may have succeeded in concealing her origins and thus escaping the Shoah. From 1951 to the 1970s, Reinhardt - together with Kohlrusch until her death on 19 July 1969 - ran a dyeing, cleaning and laundry shop on Winterfeldtstrasse.

=== Local ===
In 1945, Hahm and Reinhardt opened a bar for lesbian women on Spittelmarkt, The bar existed from 1945 to 1947 for around one and a half years and was therefore the first lesbian bar in East Berlin. Since the restaurant was not well-liked in the Soviet sector, they moved to Oranienstrasse 162 in the western part of Berlin and opened there under the name “Max and Moritz”, the restaurant was popular among lesbian women until the 1960s. A contemporary witness reported: “Katy’s restaurant was a real contact court because she tried very hard to establish contacts without appearing in any way disreputable. She referred ‘new’ women to certain tables [...]”.

In 1958, there was evidence of women's clubs at “Kati and Eva” at Augsburger Straße 52. Reinhardt promoted this through small advertisements in Aphrodite, a supplement for lesbian women published from 1956 to 1958 in the homophile magazine Der Ring. The young Gisela Necker frequented there from 1959 and remembered it in 2011: “Back then there was a club called 'Bei Kathi' in a backyard on Augsburger Straße. But this was only found out through connections. We played party games and dance games there. […] Bei Kathi was still very discreet, with the atmosphere of a club, very plush and with dim lighting; people went there late at night."

=== "Elite dance evenings" ===
In 1945, immediately after the end of the war, Reinhardt and Lotte Hahm began to organize larger events. They tried to organize balls together at the Magic Flute, but Reinhardt soon began organizing balls on her own. These balls were called “elite dance evenings” and took place once a month from the 1950s to the early 1980s. The locations changed, around 1950 in the “cabin” behind the Schöneberg town hall, in the winter in the 1950s and in the 1980s in the Hotel Intercontinental, later also in the Eierschale in Dahlem.

Around 200 women regularly took part in these balls, some from abroad. Women were only allowed access by invitation if Reinhardt had included them in her “private file”. To do this, they had to know Reinhardt or have recommendations from other women. In many cases, these women had already known Reinhardt from before the war; overall, the audience was older.

The elite dance evenings of the pre-war period remained stuck in their form. The historian and activist Ilse Kokula, who was able to take part in one of these balls in the 1970s, described that, for example, The dances still followed the patterns of the 1920s, which seemed strange to her. Among other things, polonaises were part of these dance evenings. Historian and activist Claudia Schoppmann had the opportunity to take part in such a ball in 1981 at the Hotel InterContinental Berlin.

=== Death ===
By the mid-1980s, Reinhardt was ill and dependent on social benefits. She died on 28 June 1987 in the Elisabeth Hospital in Berlin-Tiergarten, then part of West Berlin. She was buried on 6 August in the municipal cemetery in Berlin-Steglitz; the grave was later leveled.

== Research history ==
With the destruction of their organizations and media by the Nazis from 1933 onwards, the first homosexual movement and its protagonists were increasingly forgotten. The continued repression in the post-war Federal Republic only led to the first investigations with the lesbian and gay movement from the early 1970s onwards among activists and their interest in their "own history".

Since Reinhardt almost never published texts, contemporary advertisements and reports about her events as well as later memories and interviews with contemporary witnesses are the main sources about her activities. Despite her long and constant presence in the lesbian subculture, Reinhardt neither sought connection to the new lesbian movement nor bore witness to its activities. Reinhardt evaded research requests from Ilse Kokula and refused interviews. When Claudia Schoppmann considered an interview request in the mid-1980s, Reinhardt was “unfortunately already too senile to say anything.”

Reinhardt was mentioned in connection with her events in early texts on the first lesbian movement, for example. by Gertrude Sandmann. In monographic works on the history of the Berlin homosexual movement, Heike Schader in 1994 and Jens Dobler in the early 2000s systematized and supplemented the knowledge about Reinhardt. In 2020, Claudia Schoppmann published a first biographical account of Käthe Reinhardt's life.
