= Das 3. Geschlecht =

First transvestite magazine published in Weimar Germany from 1930 to 1932

Das 3. Geschlecht ("The Third Sex"), subtitled Die Transvestiten ("Transvestites"), was a transvestite magazine of Weimar Germany, published from 1930 until 1932 in Berlin. Published by the Radszuweit publishing house, it is believed to be the first transvestite magazine in history. A predecessor to the magazine was Die Freundin, a more lesbian-focused magazine that nonetheless published some columns appealing to transvestites.

Das 3. Geschlecht first appeared on May 28, 1930. The magazine was planned as a monthly, but was published at greater intervals, issue 2 in September 1930, issue 3 in February 1931, and issue 4 in July 1931. Issue 5 of May 1932 was the last issue; shortly before, the publisher Friedrich Radszuweit had died, and his heir Martin Radszuweit did not continue the magazine. The issues each comprised 40 pages, they contained activist texts, medical articles, clothing guides, belletristic texts as well as reports on the experiences of transvestites, supplemented by numerous photographs of transvestites. Their appearance is considered one of the few pieces of evidence of the first "constitution of transvestites as a gender minority". Frequently seen in illustrations was Lotte Hahm, a prominent lesbian and transvestite activist within Weimar homosexual subculture. Both Selli Engler and Elsbeth Killmer published texts there.
