= History of LGBTQ people in policing =

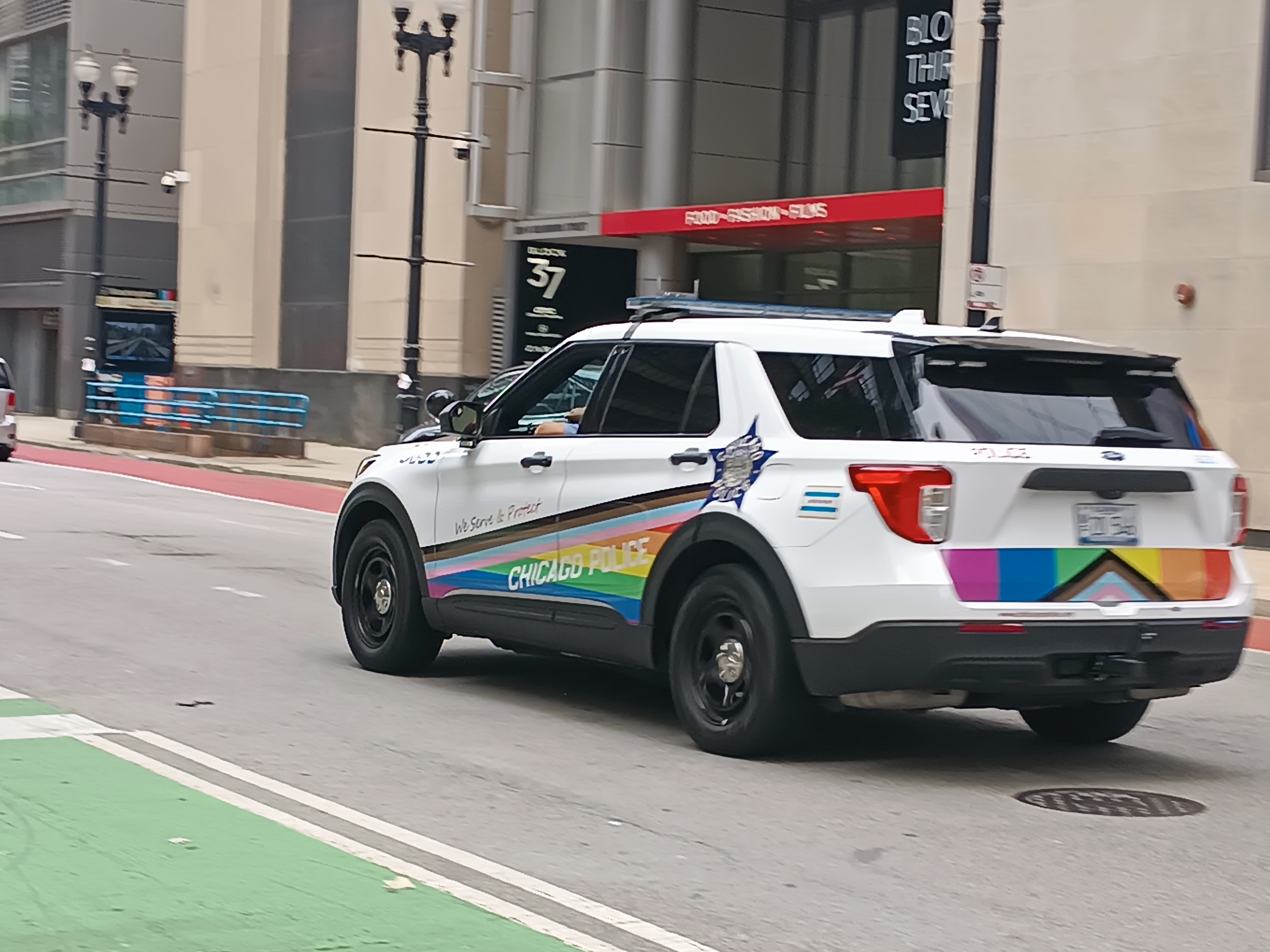
Vehicle of the Chicago police with an LGBTQ branding

The presence of LGBTQ officers in law enforcement has a history of controversy. As times have changed, police forces have adapted by adding LGBTQ divisions, officers and committees within their ranks to account for legislation established by governments to protect individuals who previously had little or no voice when it came to laws impacting their own communities.

== Introduction ==
=== Diversity and inclusion in policing ===
Diversity in service and the elimination of discrimination across the planet is led by many individuals, staff, associations and others within the global police community.

Inclusivity, evolution, acceptance, intersectionality, organizational values and career advancement lead to cops and acceptance.

Nevertheless, many LGBTQ individuals still face significant discrimination in the police force. In a 2013 study of British forces, Jones and Williams found that almost 20% of sexual minority officers said they experienced discrimination. At the same time, only 25% of those individuals reported the incident to a supervisor.

The following is a timeline of lesbian, gay, bisexual, transgender and queer (LGBTQ) police history.

== 1970s ==
=== 1974 ===
U.S.

- Alameda County (California) Sheriff's office begins recruiting gay officers, in the face of gay crime victims in San Francisco having reluctance to report the crimes against them.

=== 1978 ===
U.S.

- New York City mayor Ed Koch bans discrimination in police hiring on the basis of sexual orientation. This meets with resistance from the city's Patrolmen's Benevolent Association.
- San Francisco becomes the first city in America to have a recruitment drive for gay police officers, bringing in over 350 applications.

=== 1979 ===
U.S.

- Washington DC approves an officer (Bonnie Davenport) who received sex reassignment surgery the previous year to return to active duty as a woman. She continued to serve the police force as a woman for 12 additional years of service.

== 1980s ==
=== 1981 ===
U.S.

- A Sergeant of the New York City Police Department (Charles H. Cochrane Jr.) comes out as gay during a city council hearing. This made him the first New York City Police Department member to publicly announce his homosexuality. In 2016, a Greenwich Village street was named after him (Sergeant Charles H. Cochrane Way). A news story that quoted journalist Andy Humm reported:

"He gets up and says, 'I'm proud to be a New York City police officer,'" Humm said. "And then he says, 'I'm equally proud to be gay.' And the City Hall chamber, Council chamber almost fell out."

=== 1982 ===
U.S.

- New York City police sergeant Charles H. Cochrane Jr. and former Fairview, New Jersey sergeant Sam Ciccone form the first group targeted at the needs of gay members of law enforcement, the Gay Officers Action League (GOAL).

=== 1985 ===
U.S.

- The Golden State Peace Officers Association, "an organization of gay police officers, sheriff's deputies, California Highway Patrol officers and other homosexual law enforcement personnel", was started in 1985 and is thought to have been formed as an informal group of officers who "got together after work to drink beer and discuss the frustrations of police work. In a Spokane, Washington news article from 1987, a reporter claims the group was unofficially called "Pigs In Paradise".

== 1990s ==
=== 1990 ===
United Kingdom

- Gay Police Association (GPA) founded by Constable James Bradley from the Metropolitan Police Service plus four other officers to represent the interests and needs of gay and bisexual police and staff in the United Kingdom.

=== 1991 ===
Canada

- The death of Alain Brosseau inspired the creation of a combined effort of LGBT activists and Ottawa police and formed the GLBT Ottawa Police Liaison Committee. It included sensitivity training for police officers, as many of the LGBT activists noted the hatred and intolerance for the gay community that was held by members of the RCMP and Ottawa city police. The "diversity training" was a three-hour session that was held for all 600 members of the Ottawa city police service.

U.S.

- The Lesbian and Gay Police Association was initially a group of four Chicago police officers who founded the organization to support gay and closeted police officers at that time. "The LGPA is dedicated to promoting solidarity and upholding Human Rights, providing support and social interaction for its members and to promote understanding between the police and the LGBT Communities through education, communication and charitable acts."

=== 1993 ===
Canada

- Some sources say the country's first hate crimes unit was created in Ottawa while other sources claim it never existed and is rather the "security and intelligence service" misinterpreted as the hate crime unit. However the security and intelligence service does investigate hate crimes.

=== 1995 ===
U.S.

- The first float on the 1995 GLBT parade in Chicago was the GOAL-Illinois float.

== 2000s ==
=== 2001 ===
France

- Flag !Creation of an association of LGBT police officers in France

=== 2003 ===
United Kingdom

- London's Metropolitan Police allows 35 uniformed officers to participate Pride in London, the first time that police officers where allowed to wear uniforms while participating in Pride in London.

=== 2004 ===
European Union

- The European Gay Police Association formed to support best practises and help developing countries build internal and external capacity for service provision.

=== 2009 ===
Peru

- Peru announces a nationwide ban on police officers who have same-gender sexual relations, stating that they caused harm to the image of the police force.

== 2010s ==
=== 2014 ===
United Kingdom

- Suzette Davenport, the Chief Constable of Gloucestershire Constabulary came out on stage at the county's Pride event in 2014.

=== 2015 ===
United Kingdom

- In the United Kingdom, after the disbanding of the GPA because of government austerity measures, the National LGBT Police Network was established providing support to England, Wales and Northern Ireland.

United States

- Two gay police officers become the first partnered couple to graduate from the Boston Police Academy together. At the time of their graduation, it was believed that the couple may have been the first openly gay couple in any major police department in the U.S.

=== 2016 ===
Canada

- A gay Toronto police officer sends an open letter to organizers of Pride Toronto regarding political action by Black Lives Matter in 2016's parade that demanded the organizers exclude Toronto Police Service uniformed officers and police vehicles from participating in future parade festivities.

"Police officers are significantly represented in the LGBTQ community and it would be unacceptable to alienate and discriminate against them and those who support them. They too struggled to gain a place and workplace free from discrimination and bias."

- Police in Toronto establish the Youth Justice Bursary Fund headed by an LGBTQ Liaison officer who provides community policing support to Toronto Police Service LGBTQ members and community members.

Chile

- Chile's Hugo Alcalde becomes that country's first gay police officer to have a civil union.

Netherlands

- The 1st annual World LGBT Conference for Criminal Justice Professionals was held in August of this year with the theme of "To Connect And Inspire".

United States

- Among those injured in a Dallas, Texas sniper attack in July 2016 was a Dallas Area Rapid Transit officer. He and his former husband - himself a DART officer - worked with "Resource Center, a lesbian, gay, bisexual and transgender organization — to get same-sex partner benefits for DART a few years earlier".

== 2020s ==
=== 2021 ===
United Kingdom

- Adrian Hanstock was made the temporary Chief Constable of the British Transport Police, making him the first openly gay man to be chief of police of a British police force.

== Historical associations ==
- Golden State Peace Officers Association
- Gay Officers Action League

== See also ==
- History of LGBTQ in journalism
