= Das dritte Geschlecht =

Das dritte Geschlecht is German for "the third sex" or "the third gender". It may refer to:

- Das dritte Geschlecht (novel) by Ernst von Wolzogen
- Different from You and Me, 1957 German film
- Das 3. Geschlecht, a transvestite magazine published in Berlin from 1930 to 1932
