= The Third Sex =

The Third Sex may refer to:

- The Third Sex (band), an American queercore band
- The Third Sex (film), the working title of the 1957 German film Different from You and Me
- "The Third Sex", an episode of the American TV series Taboo
- Das 3. Geschlecht ("The Third Sex"), a German magazine

== See also ==
- Third gender, a concept in which individuals are categorized, either by themselves or by society, as neither a man or woman
