= Świebodzin =

Town and capital of Świebodzin County, Lubusz Voivodeship, Poland

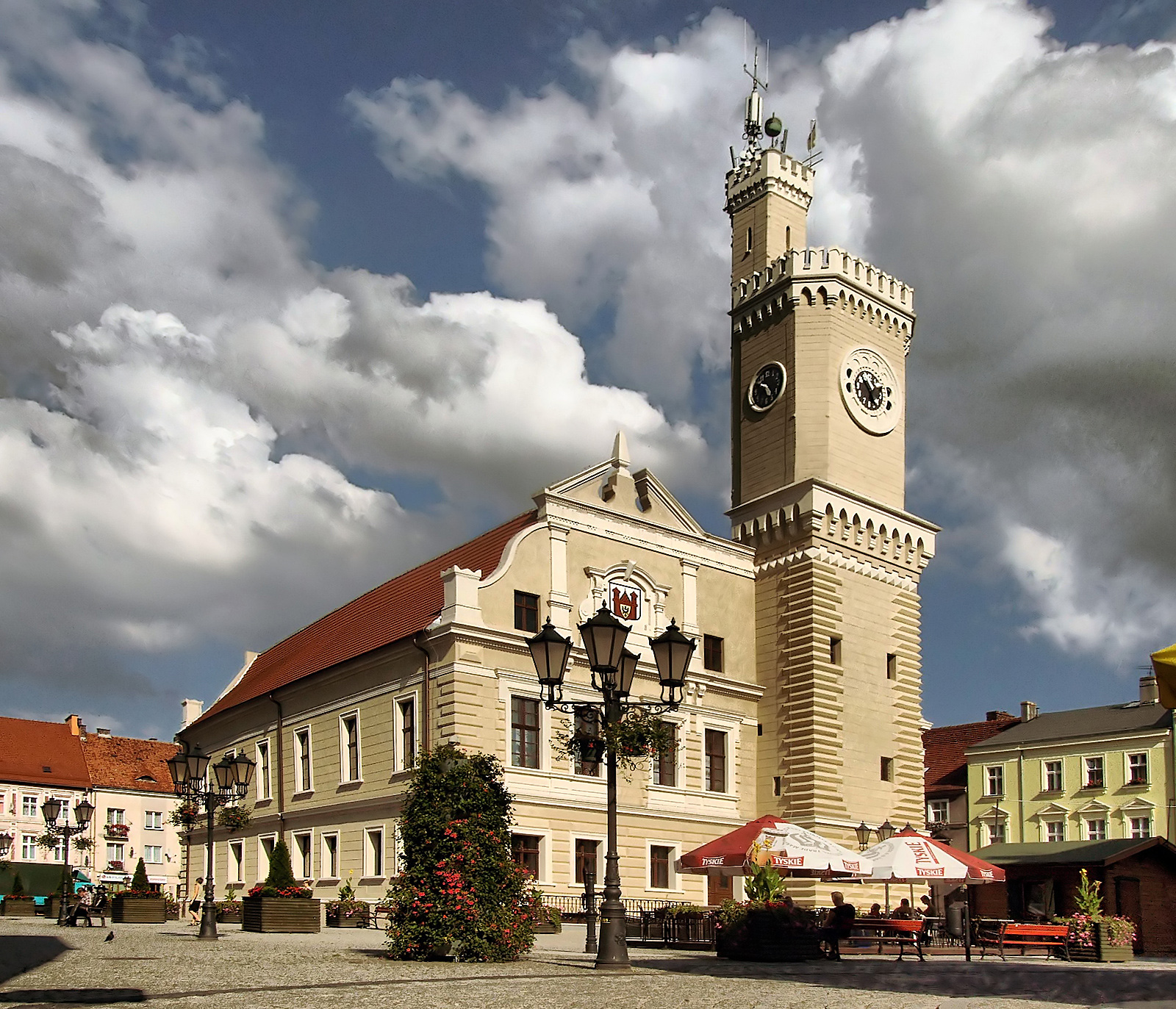
- Town hall of Świebodzin

- Flag Coat of arms

- Location within Poland
- Coordinates: 52°15′N 15°32′E
- Country: Poland
- Voivodeship: Lubusz
- County: Świebodzin
- Gmina: Świebodzin

Government
  - Mayor: Tomasz Olesiak

Area
  - Total: 10.54 km^{2} (4.07 sq mi)

Population (2025-01-20)
  - Total: 20,744
  - Density: 1,968/km^{2} (5,097/sq mi)
- Time zone: UTC+1 (CET)
  - Summer (DST): UTC+2 (CEST)
- Postal code: 66-200 to 66-201
- Car plates: FSW
- Website: www.swiebodzin.eu

Świebodzin (Polish: [ɕfjɛˈbɔd͡ʑin]; German: Schwiebus) is a town in western Poland with 20,744 inhabitants (2024). It is the capital of Świebodzin County in Lubusz Voivodeship.

Świebodzin is an important transportation hub, lying at the crossroads of the Polish national roads 2 and 3. The A2 motorway and S3 expressway cross near the town. Świebodzin is located 39 km (24 mi) northeast of Zielona Góra, one of the two voivodeship's capitals, 195 km (121 mi) northwest of Wrocław and 110 km (68 mi) west of Poznań; 70 km (43 mi) east of the German border and 130 km (81 mi) east of Berlin. The crowned statue of Christ in Świebodzin, completed in November 2010, is one of the world's tallest statues of Jesus.

== History ==
=== Middle Ages ===
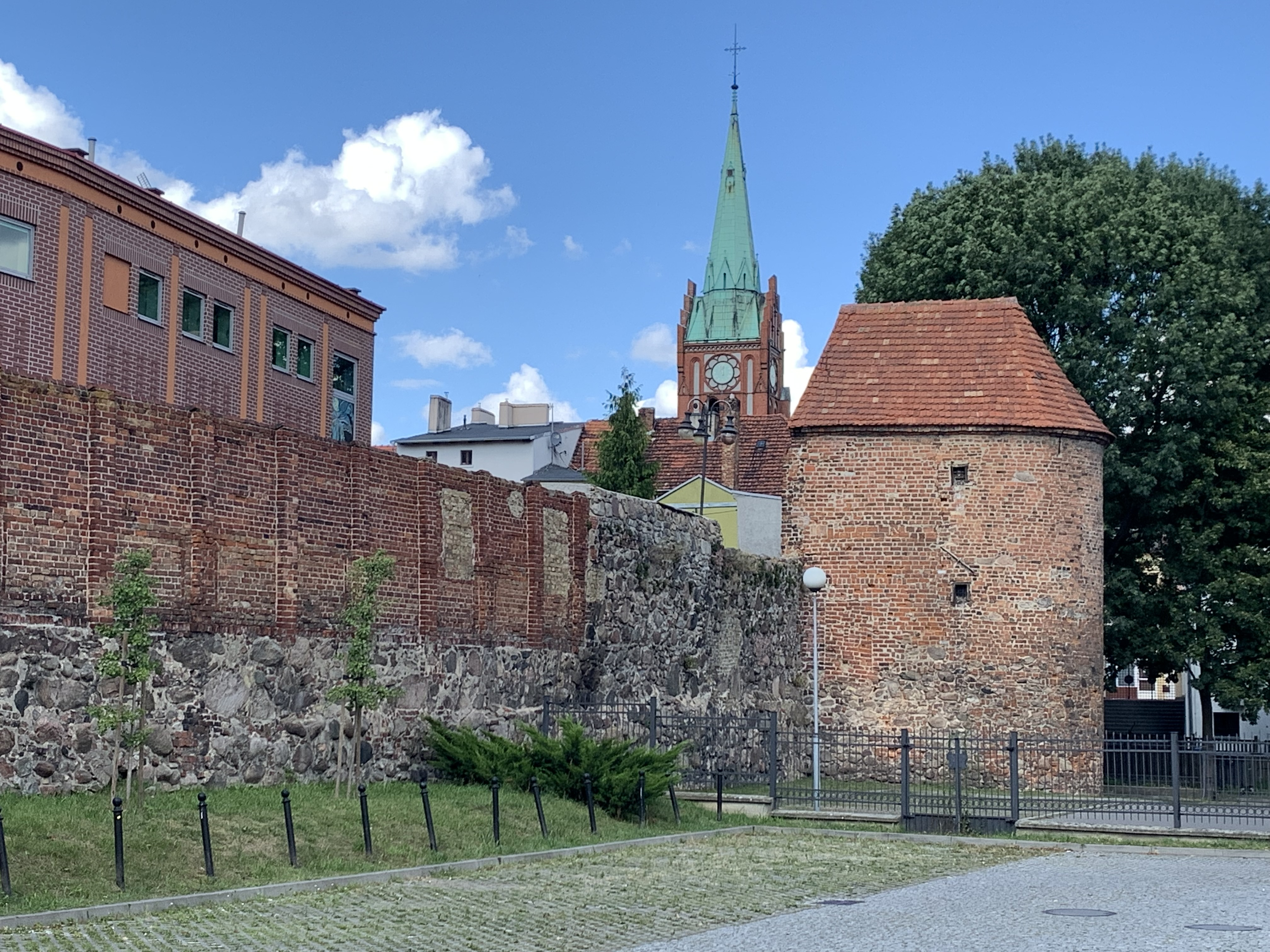
Partly preserved medieval town walls

The town's name derives from the Polish personal name Świeboda, related to swoboda meaning "freedom". The area was part of Poland from the time of the state's creation in the 10th century. As a result of the fragmentation of Poland, it initially was part of Greater Poland, and later it was part of Silesia. The earliest historical records which mention Sebusianis, Sipusius Silesius, Suebosian, Soebosian, Suebusianus for today's Świebodzin date from the beginning of the 14th century, when the area belonged to the Lower Silesian Polish-ruled Duchy of Głogów. The town sprang up at the intersection of the old trade routes linking Silesia with Pomerania and a branch of the route running from Lusatia to Poznań in Greater Poland and further to Pomerelia. Initially, the town was probably a defensive fortification, built on the western banks of Lake Zamecko at a slight elevation. The town wall was ringed by settlements, which were much later incorporated into the city itself.

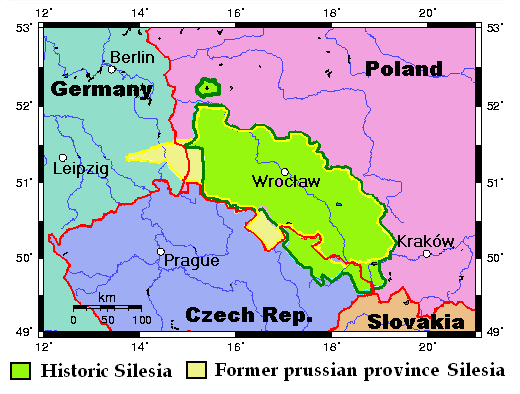
Bohemian Silesia (green) with northern Świebodzin exclave

In 1319 the Brandenburg margrave Waldemar of Ascania conquered Świebodzin and the town of Sulechów to its south. He died in the same year and the territory fell back to the Silesian Piasts, who in 1329 became vassals of Bohemia, an Electorate of the Holy Roman Empire. When in 1476 Duke Henry XI of Głogów died without issue, fights over his succession broke out between Duke Jan II the Mad of Żagań and the Brandenburg Elector Albert III Achilles of Hohenzollern, who in ca.1479 was able to acquire the northern part of the duchy with the towns of Crossen (Krosno Odrzańskie) and Züllichau (Sulechów), which were incorporated into the Neumark district of Brandenburg in 1537. The area of Świebodzin however remained a Bohemian fief, becoming an exclave of the Silesian crown land which in 1526 passed with the Bohemian Kingdom to the Habsburg monarchy.

=== Early modern period ===
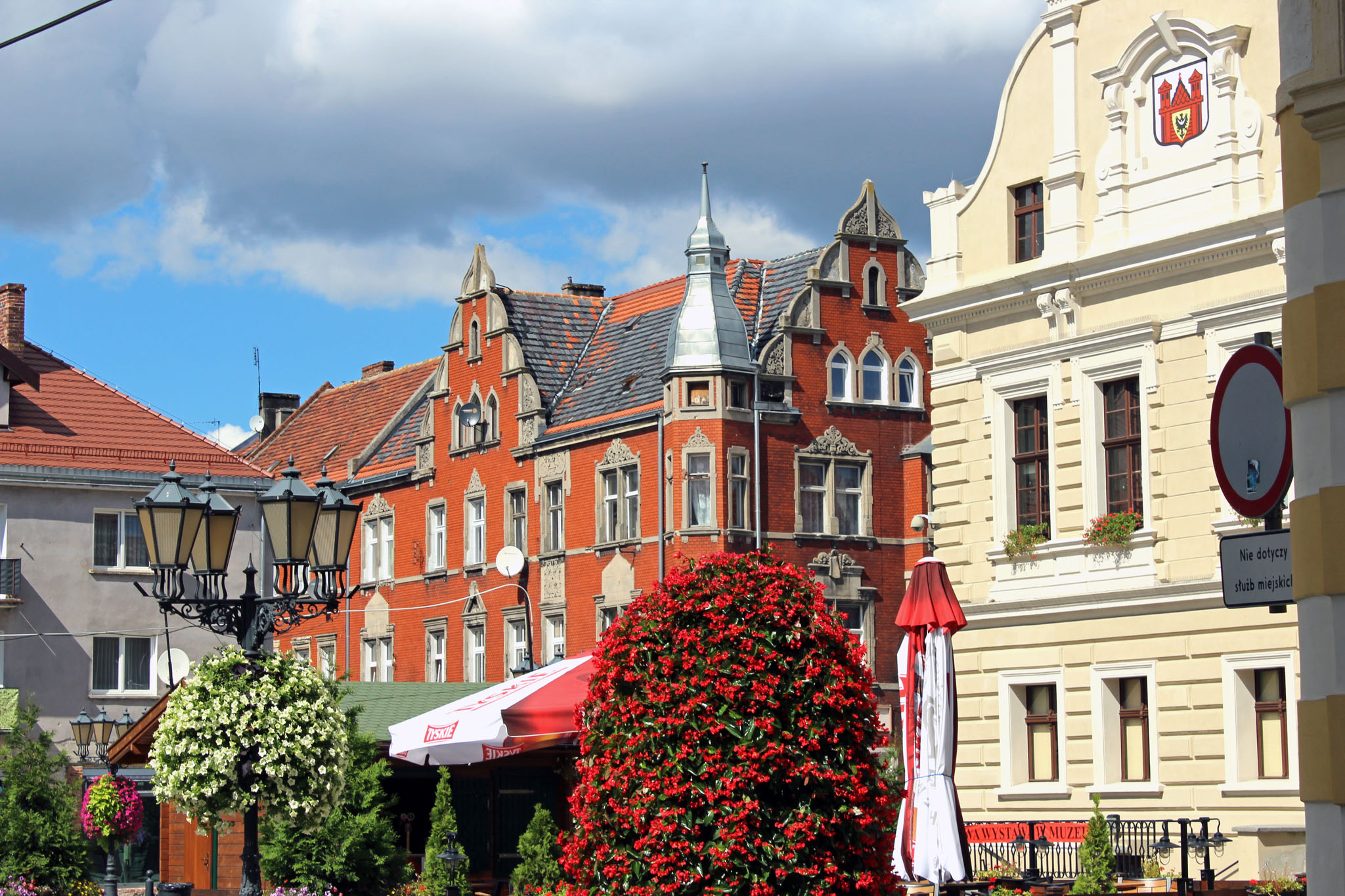
Façades at the market square

Because of the town's location at an important crossroads, it developed economically, particularly in the areas of commerce and craft production. In the 15th century and particularly in the 16th century, Schwiebus was known for manufacturing beer and exporting cloth. It also developed various urban handicrafts and manufactured goods for local purposes (the weekly market). The salt, wool, grain, horse, and beef trades were also important. For a time the Schwiebus territory was granted by the emperor to Brandenburg-Prussia. Representatives of well-known Silesian families, including the von Knobelsdorffs, among others, held authority and power in the town as district starosts and castle commanders on behalf of the Habsburgs.

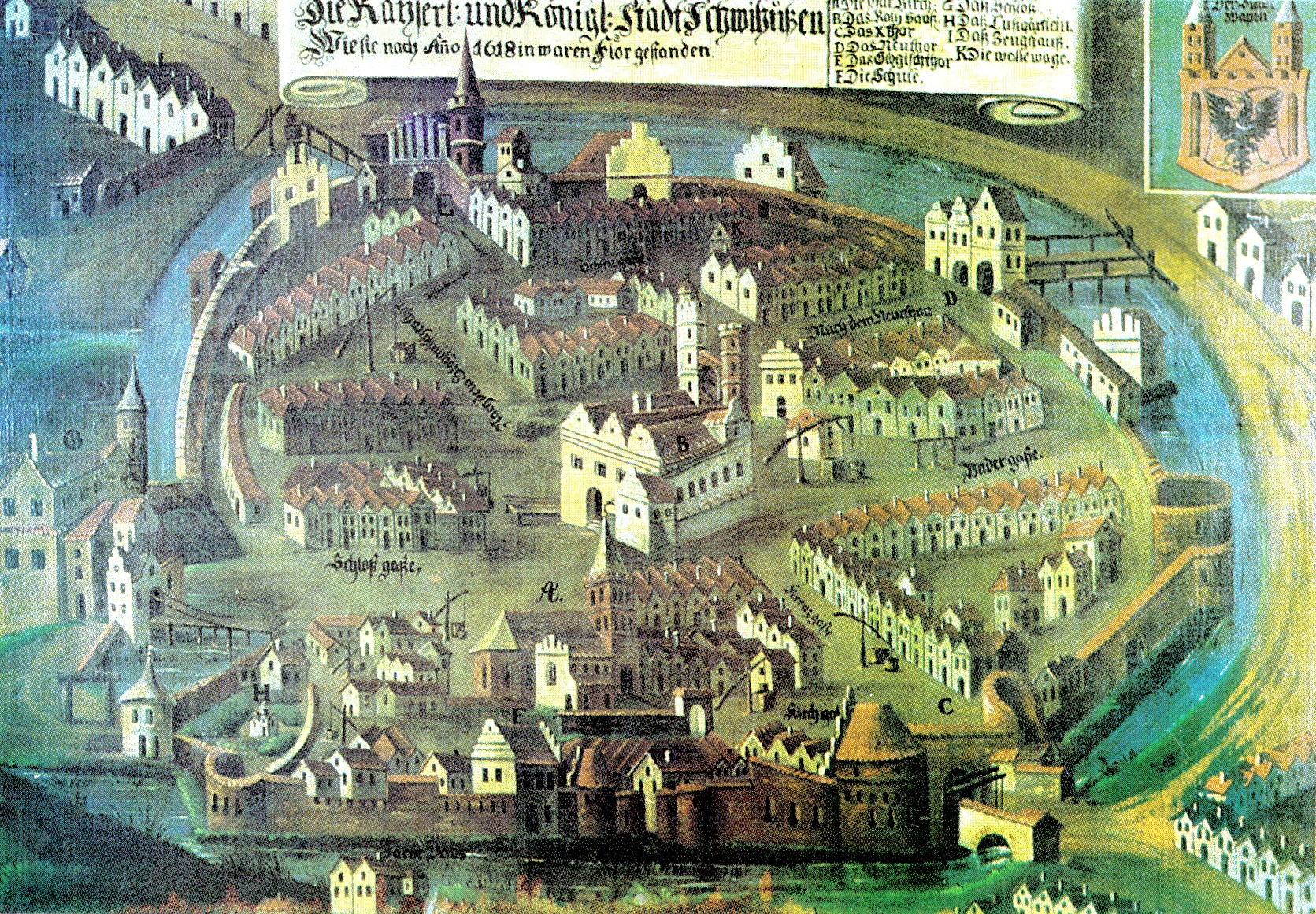
17th-century view of the town

Because of its position near the Holy Roman Empire's border with the Kingdom of Poland, the town most likely had a population of mixed Polish and German descent at this time, but Germans were the majority by the early modern period. During the 16th and the first half of the 17th centuries, the town expanded economically, spatially, and demographically, in spite of local conflicts and the turbulent Protestant Reformation and Counter-Reformation.

After the victory of King Frederick II of Prussia in the First Silesian War (1740–1742), Schwiebus came under Prussian administration. In 1817 its territory was merged with the southern Züllichau region to form the Züllichau-Schwiebus District in the Province of Brandenburg. Schwiebus remained in this territorial form until 1945. Annexation by Prussia brought about a sharp economic crisis, as the tradesmen of Schwiebus were cut off from many of their traditional markets and outlets. The Prussian authorities also increased local taxes while limiting the town's autonomy. The period of revolutions and Napoleonic Wars brought about a depression in the cloth trade and limited the economic prospects of the town.

The town's extended stagnation ended with the Stein-Hardenberg economic reforms and the beginning of the Industrial Revolution in the mid-19th century. As a medium-sized town and hub of the local market, lying at the intersection of several routes of communication, including the new Frankfurt (Oder)-Poznań railway line, Schwiebus became a center of local industry (textile, machinery, and agricultural food processing). The town was modernized at this time with improved traffic arteries, renovation of the town hall, reconstruction of the church of St. Michael, and the construction of several new public service buildings (law courts, high school, gas works, and post office). Schwiebus contributed to and benefited from the economic expansion of the German Empire in the years before 1914.

=== 20th century ===
A new period of economic stagnation began with the territorial changes in central Europe after Germany's defeat in World War I. In the interwar period, Schwiebus found itself in the eastern outskirts of Germany, twenty kilometers west of the newly imposed German-Polish border. During the 1920s, Weimar Germany experienced two major economic crises, the hyperinflation of the early 1920s and the Great Depression beginning in 1929. The citizens of Schwiebus suffered severe economic hardship during this time. As was the case elsewhere in Germany, many of the town's citizens were dissatisfied with their lot and turned to political extremism.

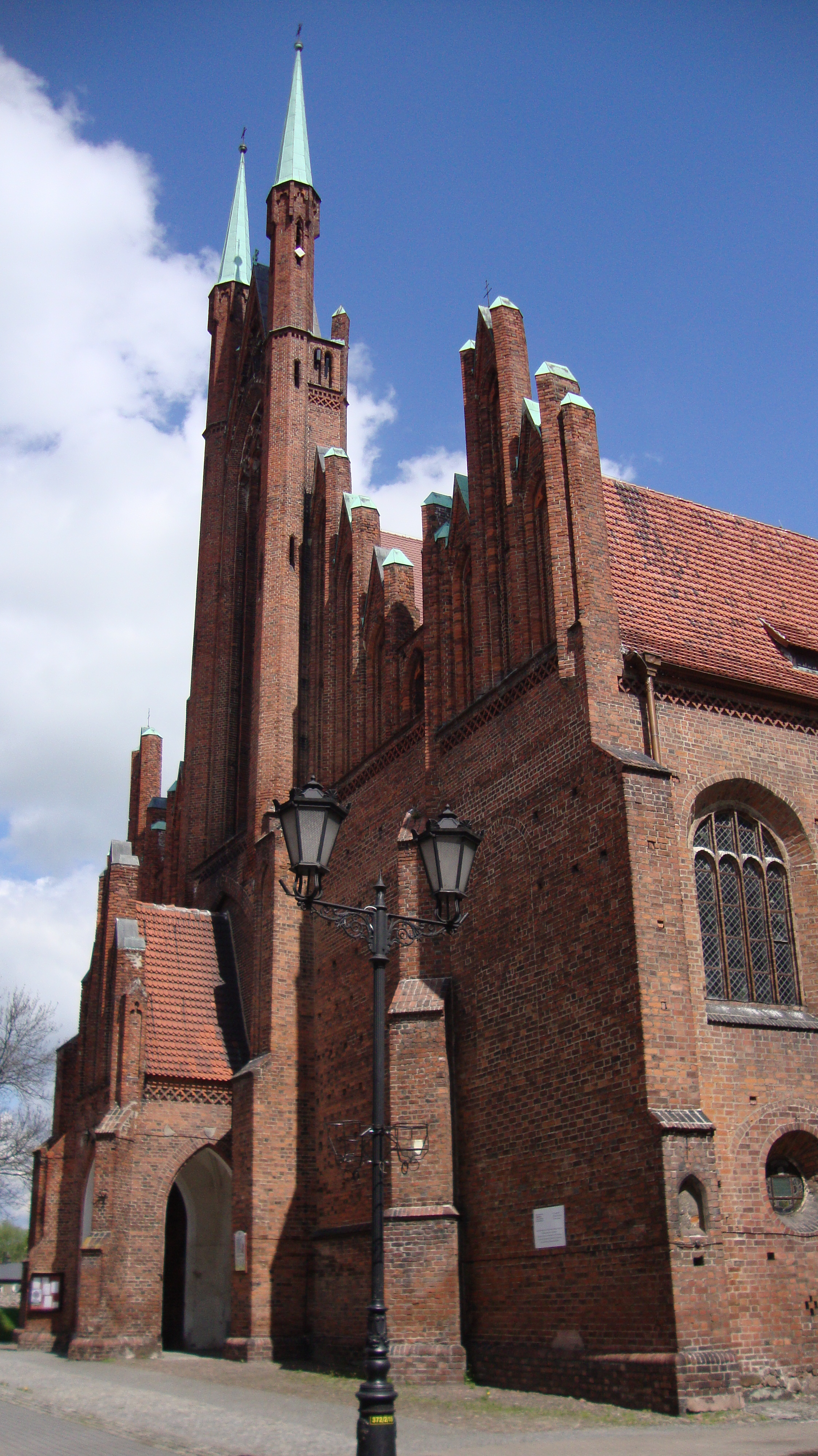
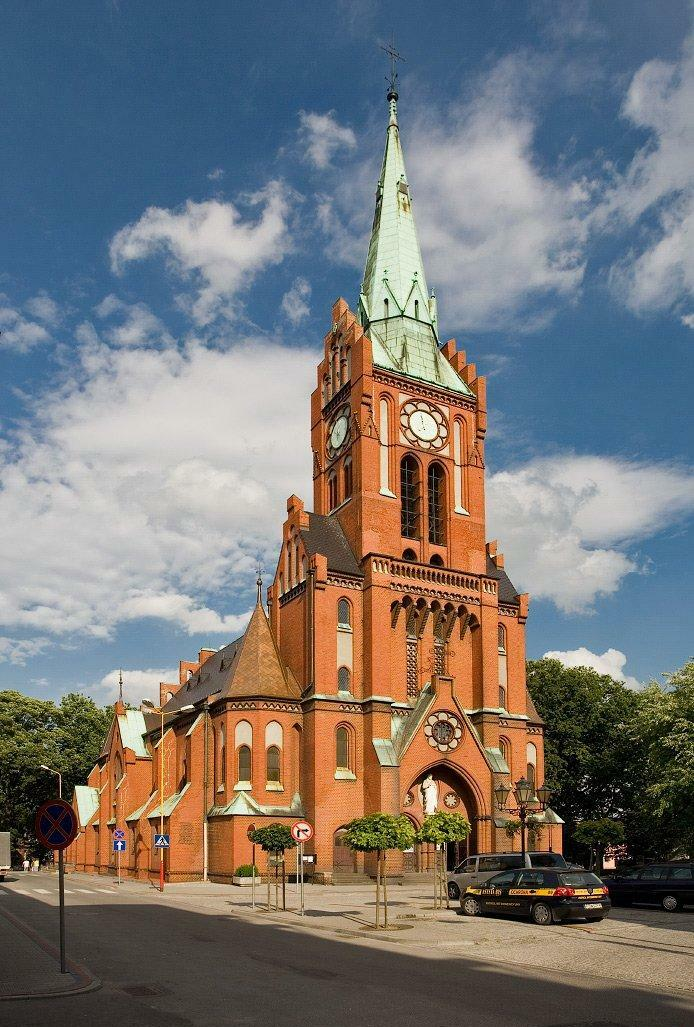
Historic churches of Świebodzin: Saint Michael Archangel church (on the left), Our Lady Queen of Poland church (on the right)

Adolf Hitler of the Nazi Party came to power in Germany in 1933. Hitler quickly moved to consolidate and expand his power, adopting severe repressive measures against his political opposition and the German Jewish minority. However, Hitler remained popular with the public because he oversaw the German economic recovery of the 1930s. The new government sponsored many public works programs and a massive rearmament campaign which included the construction of an extensive fortified line of bunkers, Ostwall (today known as the Międzyrzecz Fortified Region) twenty kilometers north of Schwiebus.

During World War II, Nazi Germany operated a forced labour camp for Jews in the town. The war first brought hardship to Schwiebus and then total disaster. In early January 1945, the Soviet Red Army began its final advance through Poland into eastern Germany, reaching Schwiebus before the end of the month. By this time, many of its inhabitants had already fled, fearing the Soviet revenge for the atrocities perpetrated by the German occupation forces against the civilian population of the Soviet Union. The town was largely spared from destruction during the fighting, as the bulk of the Soviet forces passed to the north and south on their way to Berlin. It was finally captured on 31 January 1945. The capture was not without casualties.

In the aftermath of the Soviet military occupation, the German population began fleeing or was expelled as part of the broader post-war expulsions from the eastern German territories. On 26 June 1945, the newly established Polish administration expelled around 1,900 German inhabitants. From February until the end of 1945, a transit and internment camp was established in the town, where conditions were harsh and mortality was high. By early March, the camp housed approximately 5,000 inmates. In total, about 14,000 inmates passed through the camp, many of whom were deported to the Soviet Union for forced labour. The final remaining German inhabitants were expelled from the town on 6 May 1947, marking the end of the German presence in the town.

The communist economic system enacted sweeping social, economic, and political reforms. Świebodzin's economic recovery was also hampered by the Soviet policy of dismantling industrial facilities in conquered areas, and shipping components back to the Soviet Union. In this way, Świebodzin lost some of its prewar industries, particularly its breweries.

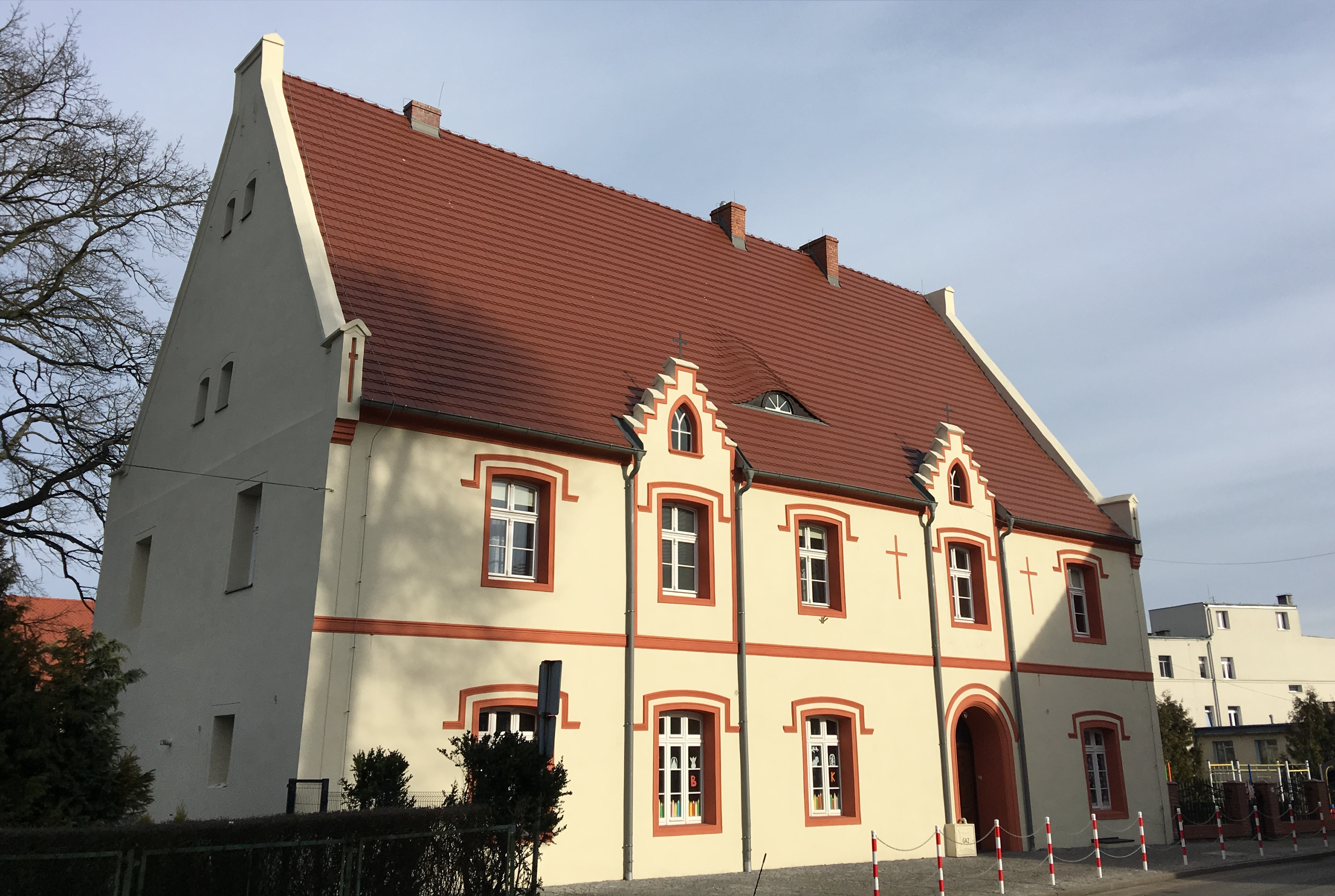
Former parish school

Świebodzin expanded in the period under communist rule, and its population doubled. New neighborhoods were built to the south of the railway line, composed largely of pre-fabricated apartment buildings. The Communist Economic Planning Commissions chose to develop the electromechanical, furniture, and timber industries in Świebodzin. Products were exported throughout Poland and to the other states in the Soviet Bloc.

Świebodzin was formerly part of the Zielona Góra Voivodeship (1975–1998). Since the Local Government Reorganization Act of 1998, it has been part of Lubusz Voivodeship.

However, with the collapse of the Soviet Bloc and the revolutions of 1989, Świebodzin once again experienced economic upheaval. With some difficulties, the local economy was adapted to the international market economy. New industries and businesses were established, but others were unable to compete in the new environment and went bankrupt. Many more goods became available in local shops, but at prices that many inhabitants could not afford. In recent years, a few foreign-owned discount supermarkets, pizzerias, hotels, and other businesses have been established in the town, taking advantage of the proximity of Poland's main east–west motorway. With the economic changes there have also been political changes. Since the restoration of free elections in 1989 the city council's former communist control has been replaced by democratic parties.

== Attractions and sites of interest ==
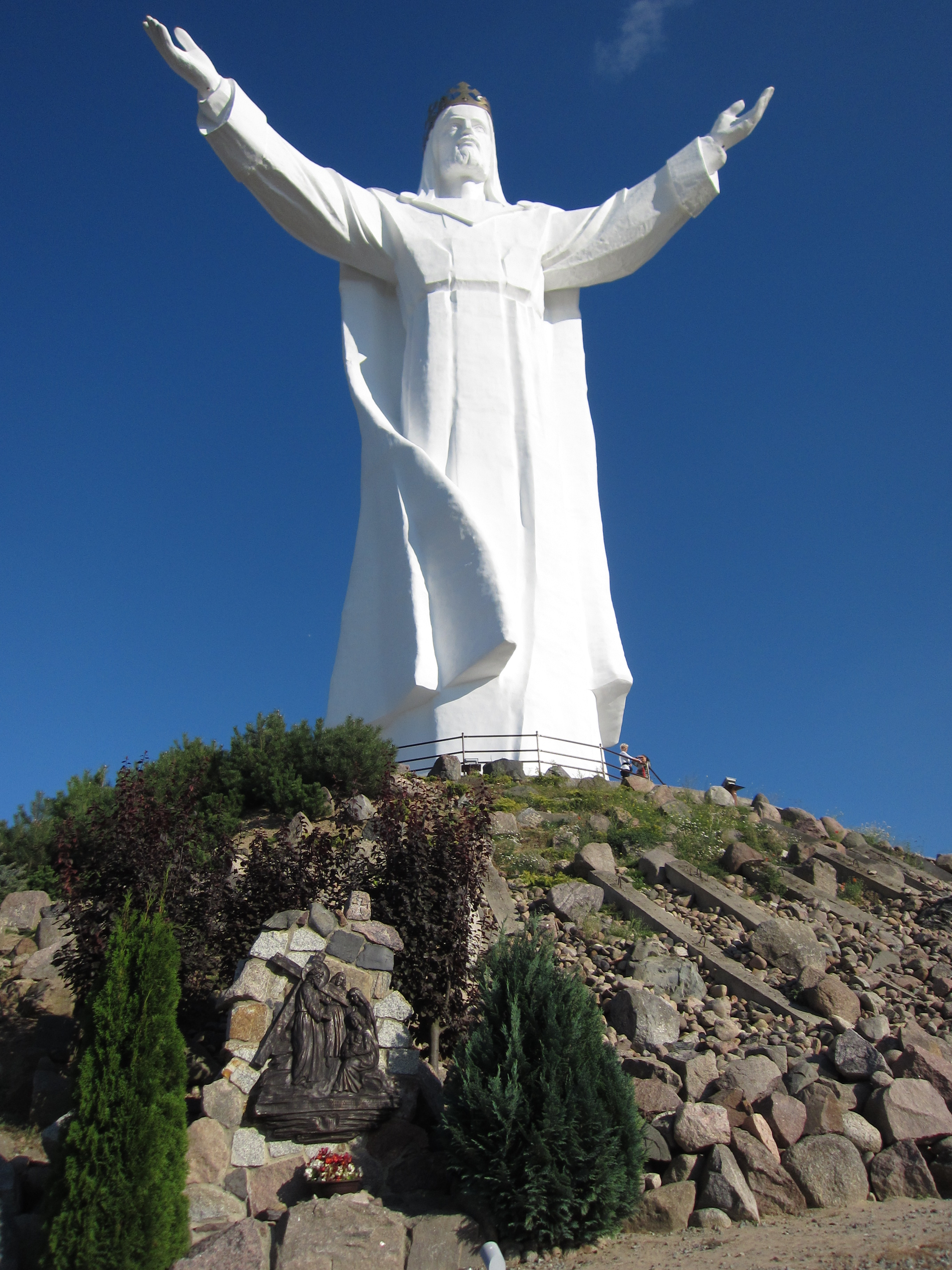
Statue of Christ the King

The center of Świebodzin still contains remnants of the town's past as a medieval walled settlement, including two nearly intact towers and fragments of the town's defensive walls and bastions. The central market square is dominated by the town hall, built around 1550 in the Renaissance style and rebuilt in the 19th century with the addition of its prominent clock tower. The town hall still contains its original Gothic vaults in the rooms of the Regional Museum and basement cafe. There are two large churches in the town center, the Church of St. Michael the Archangel and the Church of the Mother of God. The Church of St. Michael was first built in the second half of the 15th Century, and its neo-Gothic façade was added in the second half of the 19th century. The neo-Gothic Church of the Mother of God was built during the Imperial German period as a Protestant Church but was reconsecrated as a Catholic Church after World War II.

In the summer of 2008, assembly of the Christ the King, a giant statue of a crowned Jesus Christ, began on a hill on the outskirts of the town. Intended to serve as a future site of pilgrimage, the statue was completed in November 2010, and is claimed to be the world's largest statue of Jesus, although if the crown is excluded the Cristo de la Concordia in Bolivia is still taller. Construction was funded by donations from local people and as far away as Canada. The existence of the statue has seen fellow Poles referring to the town jokingly as Rio de Świebodzineiro.

== Sport ==
Świebodzin has a table tennis club KS Jofrakuda Świebodzin which is playing in 3.liga (Polish third division). The club has also the other teams playing in lower divisions of Lubusz. The club is known from a successful work with young table tennis players, who are highly ranked in Polish youth categories.

== Notable people ==
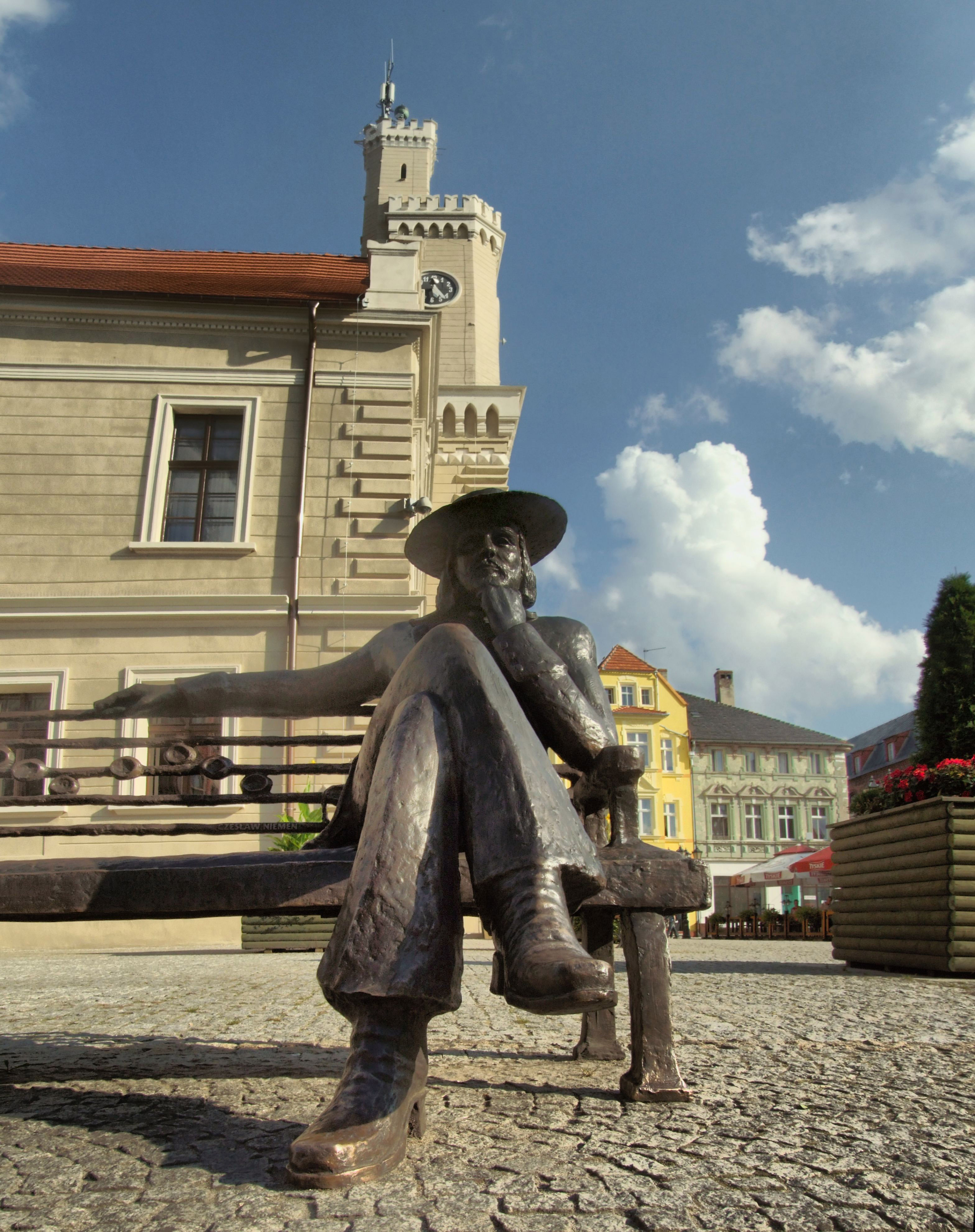
Czesław Niemen's monument on the Market Square

- Martin Agricola (1486–1556), composer
- Ruth Margarete Roellig (1878–1969), writer
- Otto Feige (B. Traven) (ca. 1882 – ca. 1969), writer of The Treasure of the Sierra Madre
- Werner Kolhörster (1887–1946), physicist
- Walter Warzecha (1891–1956), admiral and last commander of the Kriegsmarine
- Alfred Knispel (1898–1945), artist
- Selli Engler (1899-1972), German writer and leading activist of the lesbian movement in Berlin
- Karl-Heinz Bendert (1914–1983), Luftwaffe ace
- Wolfhart Westendorf (1924–2018), egyptologist
- Michael Witzel (born 1943), Wales Professor of Sanskrit at Harvard University
- Zdzisław Hoffmann (born 1959), first ever triple jump World Champion (1983)
- Piotr Rysiukiewicz (born 1974), sprinter

== Twin towns – sister cities ==
See twin towns of Gmina Świebodzin.
