= Die BIF =

1920s German lesbian magazine

Die BIF - Blätter idealer Frauenfreundschaften
- Cover of the 2nd issue of Die BIF (1927)
- Editor: Selli Engler
- Categories: Lesbian magazine
- Publisher: Selli Engler Verlag
- Founder: Selli Engler
- First issue: 1925/1926
- Final issue: 1927
- Country: Germany
- Based in: Berlin
- Language: German

Die BIF – Blätter Idealer Frauenfreundschaften (Papers on Ideal Women Friendships), subtitled Monatsschrift für weibliche Kultur (Monthly magazine for female culture), was a short-lived lesbian magazine of Weimar Germany, published from either 1925 or 1926 until 1927 in Berlin. Founded by lesbian activist Selli Engler, Die BIF was part of the first wave of lesbian publications in history and the world's first lesbian magazine to be published, edited and written solely by women.

== Publication dates ==
Die BIF was founded, edited and published by Selli Engler, who afterwards became one of the most renowned lesbian activists of Weimar Germany. It was one of three lesbian magazines of the time besides Die Freundin (since 1924) and Frauenliebe (since 1926). Among them Die BIF was unique, as both other magazines were published, edited and even partly written by men.

According to the imprint it was located at Großbeerenstraße 74 III in Kreuzberg. Engler acted as publisher, editor and writer but, as a result of financial difficulties and illness, had to delay publishing twice. Die BIF was printed at Mitsching's Buchdruckerei in Berlin; its circulation is unknown. The 1927 issues were distributed by the GroBuZ company in Berlin. Advertising offices were available in many large towns in Germany, including Dresden, Munich, Hamburg, Stuttgart and Duisburg.

Only three issues are known to have been published: Issue No. 1 (date unknown) and Issues No. 2 (January 1927) and Issue No. 3 (early 1927). The only known originals belong to the collection of the German National Library in Leipzig; Engler herself submitted them in November 1927. Copies can be found in the special libraries Spinnboden – Lesbenarchiv und Bibliothek, Schwules Museum and Magnus-Hirschfeld-Gesellschaft in Berlin and at the library of the University of Wisconsin–Madison.

The exact dates of publication of Die BIF are still unknown, as the first and the last issues contain no information on when exactly they were published. For many years researchers suggested either 1924 or 1926 as possible dates for the first issue. As 1924 has since been discounted, publication is believed to have started either in 1925 or more likely 1926. Engler discontinued Die BIF in early 1927 and started writing in July for the competing magazine Frauenliebe.

Die BIF had 24 pages and was released as a monthly magazine on the first of the month, sold on news booths at a price of 1 Mark, a relatively high price, as well as by subscription. In Issue No. 3, "on request" of readers Engler announced a lower price for a reduced number of pages, down to 50 Pfennig for 12 pages.

As a spring-off to the magazine, on January 1, 1927, Engler started the "Damen-BIF-Klub" (Ladies BIF Club), an opportunity for lesbian women to meet once a week.

== Authors and contents ==
Die BIF published mainly literary works such as fictional prose and poems along with an occasional historical or analytical article on lesbianism, discussing social and work life, fashion and lesbian identity. Engler intended to offer a magazine with a standard higher than that of its competitors, which Engler considered to be inadequate. Nevertheless, in 2016 Claudia Schoppmann referred to Die BIF as "a monthly magazine with a low literary standard". In contrast to Freundin and Frauenliebe, Die BIF refrained from reporting on Berlin's contemporary lesbian social life.

All original content of Die BIF was written by women. While many articles were written by Engler herself, other noticeable writers included Olga Lüdeke and Ilse Espe. All in all, there were at least ten contributors, five of whom later went on—along with Engler—to write for Frauenliebe. In addition to their articles, there were occasionally excerpts of works by men, selected by the publisher for their interest to readers, for example snippets from Alexandre Dumas, Magnus Hirschfeld or Otto Weininger.

== Legacy ==
Only a few contemporary comments on Die BIF are known. Franz Scott wrote in 1933 that Die BIF has been launching "excellent artistic and literary contributions", which in accordance with its standards made Die BIF superior to Freundin and Frauenliebe and stated that it failed because the target group was undemanding. Scott's comparison has been heavily criticized by Hanna Hacker in 2015 as biased, contradictory and one-sided. In 1927, Magnus Hirschfeld took a photograph that shows two issues of Die BIF from the archive of the Institut für Sexualwissenschaft, among other gay papers. In 1938 the Nazi jurist Rudolf Klare mentioned Die BIF in his article "Zum Problem der weiblichen Homosexualität" (On the problem of female homosexuality) as an example of the "abundant press" by "organisations of female homosexuals" of the 1920s in Germany.

After being forgotten for decades, Die BIF was rediscovered by Katharina Vogel and Claudia Schoppmann in 1984 as part of basic work on Engler's biography, punctually extended by Schoppmann (1997), Jens Dobler (2003) and Heike Schader (2004). Some more in-depth work followed in 2020, though a thorough analysis of the BIF's contents is still missing.

Since the rediscovery of Selli Engler and Die BIF, German and international researchers acknowledge its pioneering role as the first lesbian magazine run by women (and the only one until Vice Versa was published in 1947). Florence Tamagne highlighted this as Die BIF's "unique quality".
