= Charles H. Cochrane =

American law enforcement officer

Charles H. Cochrane, Jr.
- Cochrane in NYPD uniform
- Born: August 5, 1943
- Died: May 5, 2008 (aged 64); Pompano Beach, Florida, US
- Occupation: Police officer
- Employer: New York City Police Department

Charles Henry "Charlie" Cochrane, Jr. (August 5, 1943 – May 5, 2008) was an American law enforcement officer and sergeant with the New York City Police Department. Following his delivery of public testimony on anti-discrimination legislation pending before the New York City Council, Cochrane became the first openly gay officer of the NYPD. He later helped to form the Gay Officers Action League (GOAL).

== Early years ==
Charles Henry Cochrane, Jr. was born August 5, 1943. In 1963, Cochrane enlisted in the United States Army.

Cochrane joined the New York City Police Department in 1967. For the first 10 years of his time on the force, Cochrane kept his homosexuality a secret, known only to a limited circle of friends. He first came out to his patrol partner in 1977, gradually becoming less fearful over time, until by the early 1980s he believed that "hundreds of guys and women in the department" were aware of his sexual orientation.

Cochrane became a member of the NYPD's Manhattan South Task Force, rising to the rank of sergeant.

== 1981 City Council testimony ==
In 1981, the New York City Council announced plans to conduct hearings leading towards a ban on discrimination against gay citizens in the city. Cochrane believed it important for gay residents from a wide range of occupations to participate in the process and in the first week of November met with a group of nine friends and acquaintances who knew of his sexuality to discuss possible repercussions that he might suffer in the event that he himself gave public testimony on the matter. Deciding to move forward with the process, Cochrane met with his parents and came out as gay for the first time.

Cochrane wrote a letter to NYPD Police Commissioner Robert J. McGuire on November 15, 1981, informing him of his intent to testify before the City Council on the matter, which he did at the witness table in front of the council five days later. In reading his prepared statement before the council, Cochrane thereby became the first New York City Police Department member to publicly announce his homosexuality.

Cochrane followed Pat Burns, first vice president of the Patrolmen's Benevolent Association to the witness stand, having heard Burns declare that he knew of no gay New York City police officers, and that he was opposed to the NYPD hiring homosexuals to the force.

Cochrane dramatically contradicted Burns' assertion, stating that he was "very proud of being a New York City policeman" and "equally proud of being gay." Cochrane further testified that gay men were not "cruel, wicked, cursed, sick, or possessed by demons." "I've always been gay", Cochrane declared to a slightly stunned council chamber, which erupted after a short pause into a raucous standing cheer from Cochrane's assembled supporters. A news story that quoted journalist Andy Humm reported:

""He gets up and says, 'I'm proud to be a New York City police officer,'" Humm said. "And then he says, 'I'm equally proud to be gay.' And the City Hall chamber, Council chamber almost fell out."

== Reaction ==
Despite Cochrane's testimony, the New York City Council defeated this 1981 anti-discrimination proposal, leaving Cochrane largely unprotected by law to deal with any discriminatory consequences of his action. He found the reaction surprisingly positive, noting in an interview by The New York Times that he had received about 15 letters from other NYPD officers in the two weeks after his testimony, almost all of which were positive, and had a positive discussion with a fellow officer who was black about stereotypes and prejudice.

Cochrane remarked at the time:

Everyone I talked to within the department felt I probably would meet a lot of negative response, but I could not believe the support. Even the biggest clowns had nothing to say. Now maybe some of those cops who are already suspect and are teased a bit may finally say, "Hey, knock it off, I am gay."

The most hurtful reaction to Cochrane was a severing of personal relations by the officer who had originally persuaded Cochrane to join the police force following the public revelation of his sexuality. The dire warnings of other officers who had offered Cochrane advice before his testimony that by doing so he would be committing career suicide did not come to fruition.

== Gay Officers Action League ==
After giving testimony before the City Council, Cochrane was instrumental in establishing the Gay Officers Action League (GOAL), a support organization advocating on behalf of gay and lesbian officers in the New York City Police Department.

== Death and legacy ==
Cochrane died of cancer on May 5, 2008, in Pompano Beach, Florida. He was 64 years old at the time of his death.

On June 17, 2016, Cochrane's courageous 1981 testimony was honored with New York City street signs marking "Charles H. Cochrane Way", with the new signs unveiled at Washington Place and Sixth Avenue. At the unveiling ceremony NYPD Chief of Department James O'Neill paid tribute to Cochrane's fortitude, noting "Charlie had come out as a gay cop during a time when gay cops were afraid of losing their jobs and of being physically harmed." He added that "through the efforts of Charlie, this is now a very different New York City than it was 35 years ago and it's a very different NYPD."
