= Lotte Hahm =

Lesbian activist Weimar Germany (1890–1967)

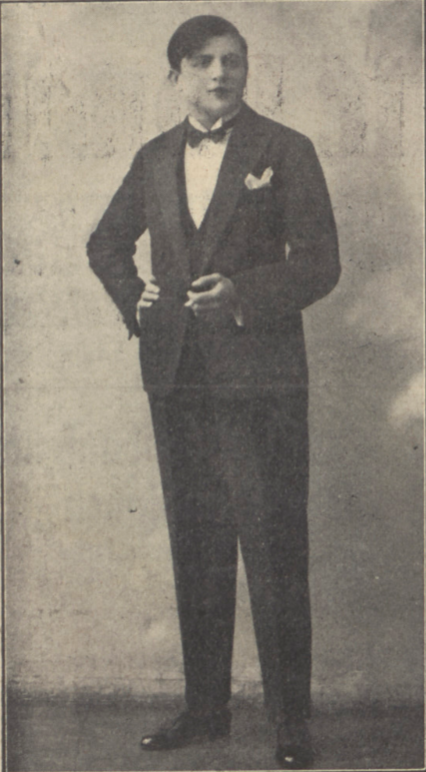
- Born: Charlotte Hedwig Hahm; 23 May 1890; Dresden
- Died: 17 August 1967 (aged 77); West-Berlin

Charlotte "Lotte" Hedwig Hahm (23 May 1890 – 17 August 1967) was a prominent activist of the lesbian movement in Berlin during the Weimar Republic, National Socialist period, and after 1949, in the Federal Republic of Germany.

Hahm was committed to organising lesbian women and improving their social situation. She was especially known for her organizing activities. Together with Käthe Reinhardt, she ran the largest lesbian clubs of the time in the 1920s, with up to 2,000 members and 500 participants, as well as various bars. She also wrote articles, organized lectures, readings and excursions, and supported the establishment of lesbian networks in other cities. In 1929 she was co-founder of the "Transvestite Association D'Eon", world's first organization of transgender people.

== Weimar Republic ==
Hahm was born in Dresden in 1890, where she still ran a mail order bookstore in 1920. In the first half of the 1920s she came to Berlin, where she started working as a lesbian activist in 1926. Of particular importance for the city's lesbian scene was her founding of the "Damenklub Violetta", which was one of the largest lesbian clubs in the city with up to about 400 participants. The club was associated with the Deutscher Freundschaftsverband (DFV), one of the major homosexual organisations of the time.

In 1929 Hahm's club Violetta united with Käthe Reinhardt's club "Monbijou", a similar sized lesbian club. In the course of this Hahm and Reinhardt changed to a larger competing organization, the Bund für Menschenrecht. The merger of the two big clubs and the change caused a great stir in the lesbian scene of the time; in the DFV and its magazine Frauenliebe there was talk of betrayal and intrigue. As justification Hahm wrote that it would have been considered "grotesque" that "a heterosexual man should be the leader of homosexual women" and on the other hand due to financial irregularities of Bergmann. She summed up that "the time has finally come for Karl Bergmann, who founded the Monbijou Women's Club only to exploit it for his personal purposes, to disappear."

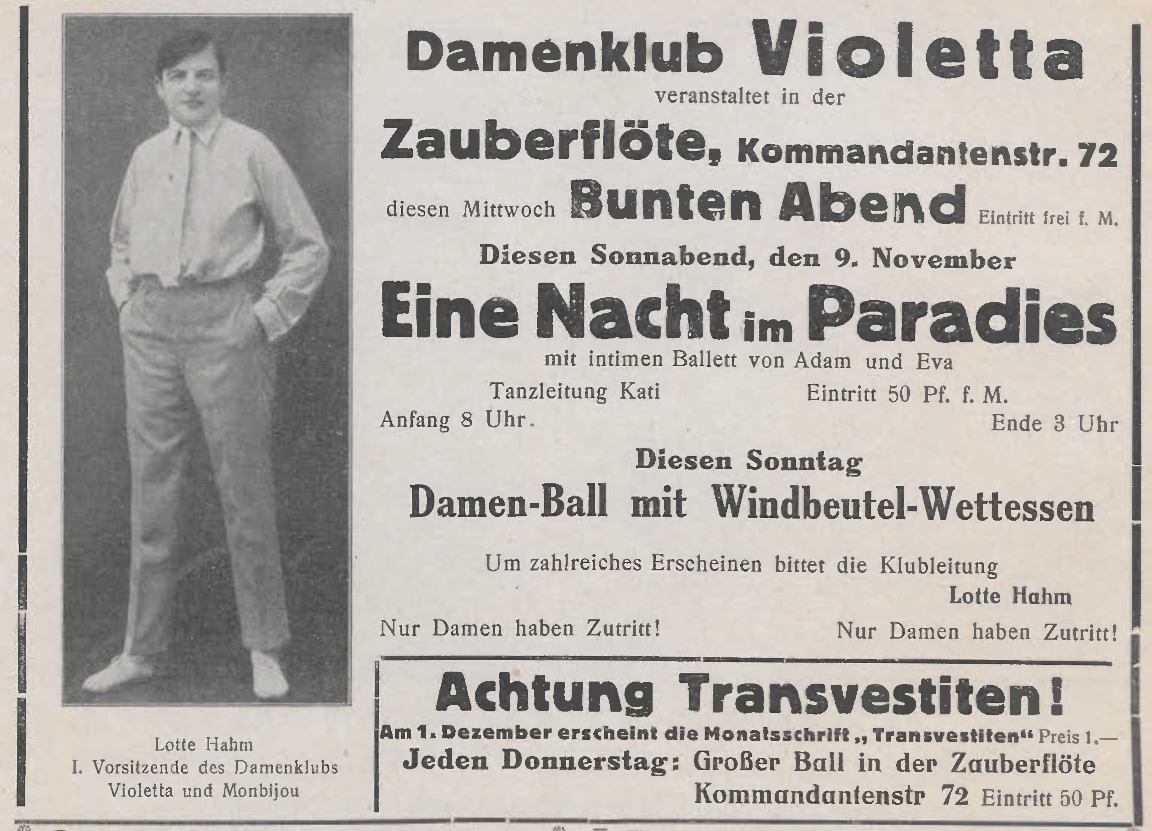
An advertisement for Damenclub Violetta, showing Lotte Hahm

Advertising photos of Hahm show her in a casual position wearing men's clothes. Although she was suspected of holding a so-called transvestite license, she was assumed to identify as a woman. Together with Felix Abraham, in 1929 Hahm was involved in the foundation of the first German organisation for transgender people, the transvestite association D'Eon, which still existed in 1932. D'Eon was open to people assigned male and female at birth alike, was based at the Institute for Sexology of Magnus Hirschfeld and was directed by Hahm until 1930. Hahm was also involved in the organization of lesbian groups, for example, she had been the leader of the women's group of the BfM since 1928 and in 1930 she called – unsuccessfully – for the foundation of a Germany-wide "federation for ideal women's friendship".

== Nazi era ==
Autumn 1932 was the start of the SA's anti-Semitic persecution of Jewish businesses, and Fleischmann's bars were targeted to the extent that Fleischmann has no choice but to sell her premises at a very low price . Then in 1933, by the National Socialists forbade all elements of lesbian public life with the forced closure of bars, magazines, and open air activities;

In spite of the risks involved, they started a women's group women called the "Sportclub Sonne", which was secretly the 'Violetta' lesbians' club . Until December 1934, events took place in the Jewish Lodge House in Joachimsthaler Straße 13 (later home to the Central Orthodox Synagogue of Berlin), and after that at Berliner Straße 53. After a denunciation on 17 July 1935, officers of the police and the Reich Chamber of Music observed about sixty-five women there; fifty-four women were recorded by name in the subsequent raid on 24 July, and further events of the club were prohibited. Hahm escaped the raids since she was in Hiddensee, which, according to a note in the records, was "known as a meeting place of homos. women", and it was there that she opened a pension (a type of lodging house) most probably for lesbian women.

The rest of her time under Nazism is poorly, and at times inconsistently, documented and reported. She may have first come to their attention in 1933, as a contemporary witness recounted that Hahm was arrested when she was charged by the father of a friend with seducing minors.

It is certain however, even though the files were destroyed, that she was taken to the Moringen concentration camp in early 1935, as fellow prisoners remembered her telling the tale of her arrest in Berlin at the Alexanderplatz by the Gestapo She said she had been looking after a suitcase, for a person whose name she did not disclose, and when this was searched and Communist material was found within. In the camp, Hahm joined a communist group, and presumably was tortured, but she kept silent about her experiences in the concentration camp even after the war.

By 1937, Hahm was free again and working as a textile trader in the Berlin area, but the business was not a success, and she cheated her driver out of his wages. He sued her for fraud, and Hahm was sentenced to a fine and imprisonment. Having avoided prison, in 1939 Hahm resumed her earlier activities and started for a brief time a lesbian meeting place on Alexanderplatz on the first floor of the old Haus des Lehrers. At the same time, Hahm's business partner, Fleischmann remained secretly active, taking the risk of running a restaurant with a lesbian clientele despite the life-threatening situation for her. In 1938 she was sentenced to forced labour; in 1941 she managed to escape and survived by changing hiding places, supported by Hahm.

== After the war ==
Immediately after the end of the war, Hahm began to become active again in 1945 together with Käthe Reinhardt. They tried to organize lesbian balls in the "Magic Flute"; later they moved to Oranienstraße 162. In the same year Hahm and Reinhardt opened a bar for lesbian women near the Alexanderplatz, the name and exact location of which is unknown. The bar existed from 1945 to 1947 for about one and a half years and was the first lesbian restaurant in East Berlin. Hahm was involved in the 1958 refoundation of the Bund für Menschenrecht, which failed.

Hahm and Fleischmann had separated by the end of the 1950s. In the 1960s, Fleischmann was asked whether she would agree to an official tribute to Lotte Hahm for her support during the Nazi era. Fleischmann denied this request; her reason was that she felt abandoned. In 1967 Fleischmann died in Berlin-Schöneberg. Hahm died in August of the same year in Berlin-Wannsee.

== Legacy ==
Lotte Hahm's work was already highly appreciated in contemporary times. Already for the first anniversary of Klub Violetta two poems about her were published in Frauenliebe, one by Selli Engler: "You, who have prepared a home for us through noble and serious diligence, and who with a proud and free forehead only strides forward with strength, you shall continue to be our guide, and we shall trust in you... Therefore, guide, show us the way to good and happiness, and build with us a strong bridge to all the world." In 1928 the gay magazine Neue Freundschaft described Hahm as "one of our best known and most popular leaders in the Berlin homoerotic women's movement."

Franz Scott saw Hahm in retrospect at the beginning of the 1930s alongside Selli Engler as an important personality of the first lesbian movement.

Today, Hahm is recognized for her activist work as one of the "most important activists of the homosexual subculture, especially in Berlin" and "a significant champion* for the organization of homosexual women and "transvestites" during the Weimar Republic". Her "organizational skills, untiring energy and [...] a lot of courage are emphasized".

Hahm is commemorated in the Holocaust memorial at Rio de Janeiro, Brazil.
