= Hanna Hacker =

Austrian sociologist

Hanna Hacker (born 1956 in Vienna) is an Austrian sociologist, historian and development researcher. Her focus is on feminism, queer theory and postcolonialism.

== Life ==
Hacker studied sociology as well as economic history and social history at the University of Vienna from 1974 to 1979. She then completed her doctorate in sociology and modern history at the University of Vienna from 1980 to 1985 and received her doctorate in 1986. From 2011 to 2014, she held a professorship for cultural and social science development research at the Institute for International Development at the University of Vienna. From 1986, she worked as a lecturer at various Austrian and international universities, including the Central European University. Since 1998 she has been authorised to teach the entire subject of sociology at the University of Vienna. She currently teaches gender studies and development research at the University of Vienna.

She was involved in the autonomous women's and lesbian movement in Austria for many years. Among other things, she co-founded the STICHWORT - Archive of the Women's and Lesbian Movement in Vienna.

She is co-editor of the journal Österreichische Zeitschrift für Geschichtswissenschaften (ÖZG). From 1991 to 2012, she co-edited L'Homme. European Journal for Feminist Historical Studies. She is co-founder of the Österreichische Gesellschaft für Geschlechterforschung. With Sabine Hark she organized the first Symposium of German Lesbian Studies in Berlin in 1991.

== Works ==
- Das lila Wien um 1900. Zur Ästhetik der Homosexualitäten. Wien: Promedia 1986 (Hg., mit Neda Bei, Wolfgang Förster u. a.)
- Frauen und Freundinnen. Studien zur „weiblichen Homosexualität" am Beispiel Österreich 1870–1938. Weinheim / Basel: Beltz 1987
- Donauwalzer Damenwahl. Frauenbewegte Zusammenhänge in Österreich. Wien: Promedia 1989 (mit Brigitte Geiger)
- Gewalt ist: keine Frau. Der Akteurin oder eine Geschichte der Transgressionen. Königstein/Taunus: Helmer 1998
- Whiteness.(Themenheft von:) L’Homme. Europäische Zeitschrift für Feministische Geschichtswissenschaft, 16, 2. Wien: Böhlau 2005 (Hg., mit Mineke Bosch)
- Norden. Süden. Cyberspace. Text und Technik gegen die Ungleichheit. Wien: Promedia 2007
- Queer Entwickeln. Feministische und postkoloniale Analysen. Wien: Mandelbaum 2012
- Geschlechterverhältnisse und neue Öffentlichkeiten. Feministische Perspektiven. Münster: Westfälisches Dampfboot 2013 (Hg., mit Birgit Riegraf et al.)
- Sexualitäten und Körperpolitik. JEP-Journal für Entwicklungspolitik, 29, 1, 2013 (Hg.)
- Frauen* und Freund_innen. Lesarten „weiblicher Homosexualität", Österreich 1870–1938. Wien: Zaglossus 2015
