= Ruth Margarete Roellig =

German writer

- Born: 14 December 1878; Schwiebus, Prussia, Germany
- Died: 31 July 1969 (aged 90); Schöneberg, Berlin, Germany
- Years active: 1913–1937
- Known for: Writing

Ruth Margarete Roellig (14 December 1878 – 31 July 1969) was a German writer, she is known for documenting Berlin's lesbian club scene of the late 1920s during the Weimar Republic. Additionally she published support of Nazism starting in the 1930s, and she stopped writing after the end of World War II.

== Life ==
Roellig was born on 14 December 1878 in Schwiebus, Prussia, Germany. Her parents were Anna and Otto Roehlig, they were in the restaurant and hotel business. At the age of 9, in 1887 the family moved to Berlin. After school in Berlin, Roellig began to write works.

Her first published book was in 1913, Geflüster im Dunkel (English: Whispered in The Dark), about a poet and their muse. Roellig became newspaper contributing editor in Berlin. Roellig wrote in 1920s several books over her travels to Finland, Bonn and Paris.

After her travels she started working for two lesbian feminist journals, Die Freundin (English: The Girlfriend) and Frauenliebe (English: Love of Women) later called Garçonne (English: Boyish). In 1927, her home in Berlin's Schöneberg neighborhood included living with a much younger woman and a pet monkey, they were interested in the occult and hosted many parties with actresses and writers. The following year, Roellig published a city guide, Berlins lesbische Frauen (1928), for lesbians (with a prologue by Magnus Hirschfeld). And by 1930, a second edition of the city guide was published. Roellig wrote in 1930 an article in sexual education book, Das lasterhafte Weib.

After the Machtergreifung (the Nazi seizure of control 1931–1933) of Nazism, the LGBT culture in Berlin was under pressure. Roellig who supported Nazism in 1930s wrote in 1937 her last book Soldaten, Tod und Tänzerin with antisemitic content. In 1943, her home in the Schöneberg quarter of Berlin was destroyed by an airstrike. Roellig traveled to her house in Silesia. After World War II, Roellig left Silesia and went with her friend Erika to her sister Käthe. She never wrote again after the war.

Roellig died on 31 July 1969, at the age of 90 in the Schöneberg neighborhood of Berlin.

== Works by Roellig ==
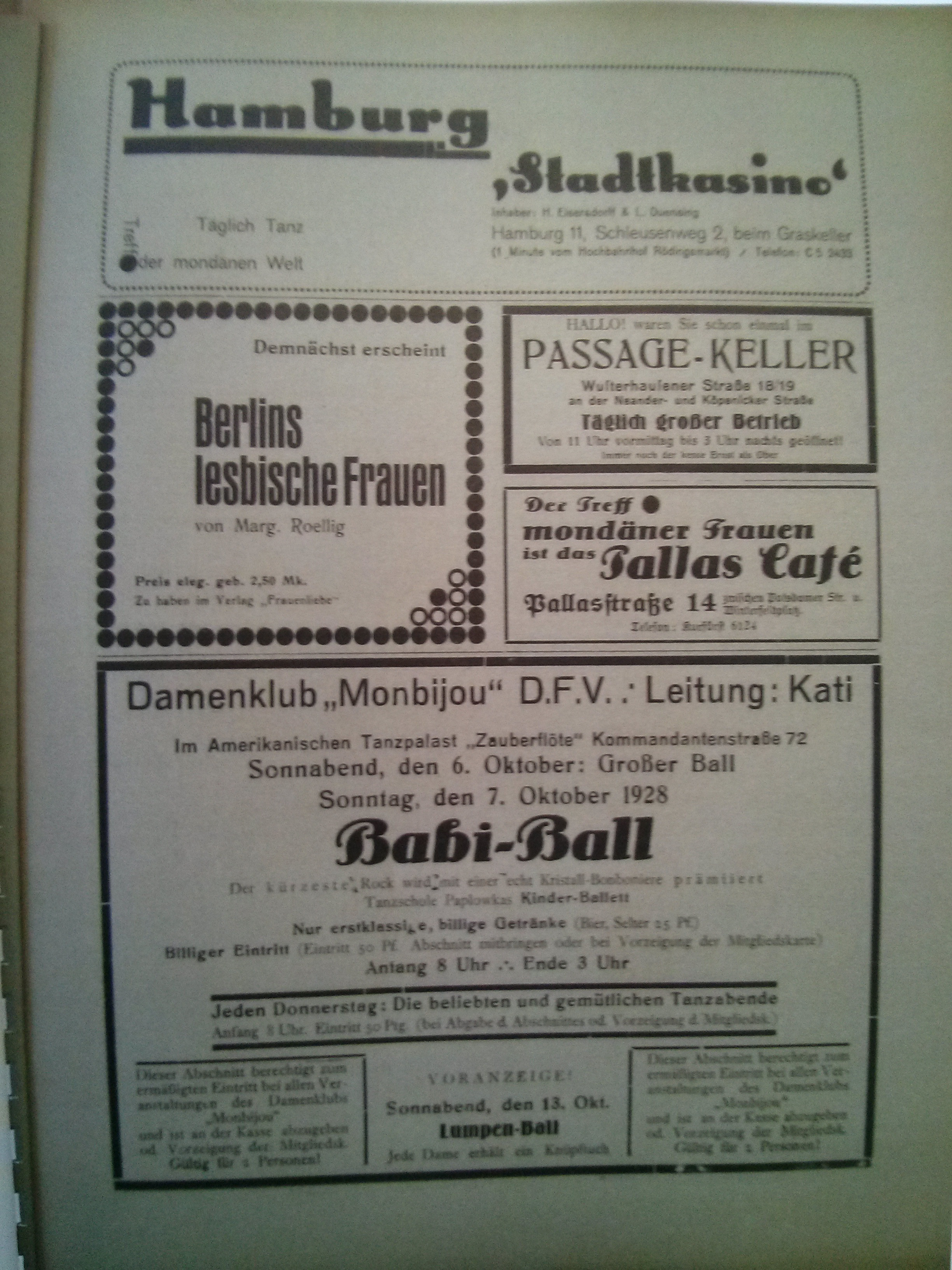
Advertisement for Roellig's book "Berlins lesbische Frauen" (1928) in the magazine Frauenliebe (1928).

=== Books ===
- Roellig, Ruth Margarete (1913). Geflüster im Dunkel [Whispered in the Dark].
- Liane (1919)
- Traumfahrt: Eine Geschichte aus Finnland (1920)
- Lutetia Parisorum (1920)
- Die fremde Frau (1920)
- Die heiligen Annunziaten (1925)
- Roellig, Ruth Margarete (1928). Berlins lesbische Frauen [Berlin's Lesbian Women]. Bibliothek der Frauenfrage in Deutschland. Magnus Hirschfeld (introduction). Bruno Gebauer Verlag f. Kulturprobleme.
- Ich klage an! (1931)
- Die Kette im Schloss (1931)
- Der Andere (1935)
- Soldaten, Tod und Tänzerin (1937)

=== Essays ===
- Roellig, Ruth Margarete (1930). "Lesbierinnen und Transvestiten" [Lesbians and Transvestites]. In Esterhazy, Agnes Gräfin (ed.). Das lasterhafte Weib [The Vicious Woman].
