= Garçonne (magazine) =

German lesbian magazine (1926–1932)

Garçonne was a Weimar-era German magazine for lesbians. It was published from 1926 to 1930 under the title Frauenliebe (Woman Love) and from 1930 to 1932 as Garçonne.

== Title ==
The magazine was named after Victor Margueritte's 1922 novel La Garçonne—whose title was translated for English readers as The Bachelor Girl—which was a critique of tomboys and flappers.

The word garçonne is derived from the French word for "boy" (garçon) with the addition of a feminine suffix; its closest English translation is "tomboy". After the publication of Margueritte's novel, the term came into popular use as a descriptor for flappers, women who wore masculine clothing, and lesbians. According to Marsha Meskimmon, the relaunch of Frauenliebe as Garçonne, "the more modish title", provided the magazine with a more marketable title that functioned as "a common currency as a lesbian type".

== History ==
=== Frauenliebe ===
Frauenliebe was established in Berlin in 1926 and its first issue was published on 9 June 1926. It was advertised with the description "Weekly for friendship, love and sexual enlightenment". (Note: Original German: Wochenschrift für Freundschaft, Liebe und sexuelle Aufklärung.) At the time, it was one of three lesbian periodicals published in Berlin, alongside Die Freundin and Selli Engler's Die BIF – Blätter Idealer Frauenfreundschaften. Its target audience included lesbians, including transgender women. Frauenliebe and Garçonne, as the competing Freundin have been published, often edited and even partly written by men, as they were part of the male dominated homosexual movement of the 1920s and 1930s, who saw lesbian women as a possible supportive force in their fight. The only independent magazine, where only women were in charge, was the short-lived Die BIF. Writer Ruth Margarete Roellig started working as a journalist at Frauenliebe in 1927.

Frauenliebe was shut down for a time in 1928 by legal authorities, who were unable to name homosexual content as offensive under a law that prohibited "trashy and obscene" literature, but deemed that the "literary portion of the issues is worthless" and the advertisements that "facilitate sexual relationships [have] to be seen as obscene in the sense of the law". In 1930, the magazine's editors changed the name from Frauenliebe to Garçonne to avoid legal troubles.

=== Garçonne ===
The first issue of the magazine printed under the new title of Garçonne was published on 15 October 1930. In addition to works of fiction and short stories, the magazine published lesbian-related news and opinion pieces from Germany and neighbouring countries; a 1931 article about the lack of lesbian organisations and publications in Switzerland led to the formation of the Swiss lesbian group Amicitia. Its issues contained ongoing debate about the nature of lesbianism and echoed the popular views of sexologists at the time that homosexuality was a form of natural biological variation. Although it was printed and distributed in Berlin, and focused mainly on Berlin's lesbian scene, it was accessible by subscription in regional areas of Germany where there was no local lesbian subculture. One reader from Görlitz submitted a letter to Garçonne in 1931 declaring that "this paper means everything to me", while another from Karlsruhe reported that "I cannot any longer do without this magazine".

Garçonne ceased publication in 1932.
