= Selli Engler =

German lesbian activist (1899–1972)

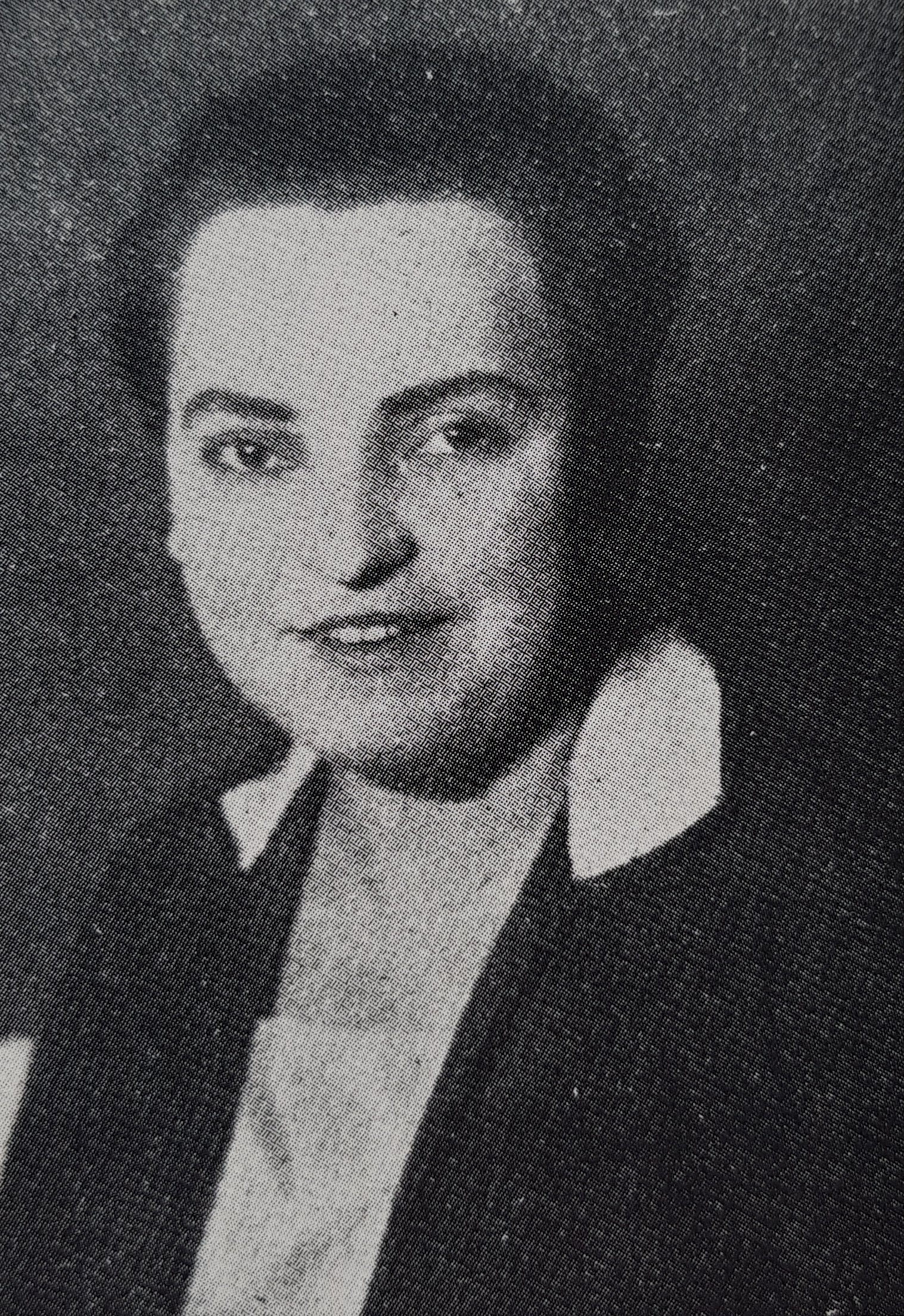
Selma Engler, 1929

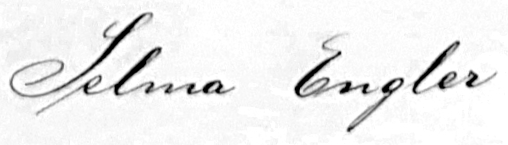
Autograph Selma Engler, 1938

Selma "Selli" Engler (27 September 1899 – 30 April 1972) was a leading activist of the lesbian movement in Berlin from about 1924 to 1931.

In 1931, Engler withdrew from the movement and focused on her career as a writer. After the end of World War II, she lived in Berlin and unsuccessfully attempted to continue her literary work. She did not return to activism, and died in obscurity in Berlin in 1972.

== Biography ==
=== Early years, 1899–1925 ===
Engler was born on 27 September 1899 in Schwiebus as daughter of Maria Franziska Engler and her husband Gustav Engler, a maker of slippers. Engler had eleven siblings, the family lived in poor conditions. The father died in 1912, in the following year Selma left school at the age of fourteen. In 1914 the mother moved to Berlin with some of the children. As the eldest of the siblings, Engler worked to support the family, initially as a saleswoman, later as an office clerk and accountant. From 1921 on, making a living was taken over by her siblings, who had grown up in the meantime; Engler presumably ran the family household at Nostitzstraße 61 for the next few years. This provided her with economic and temporal leeway for the coming decade, which she also used for her education; she learned English and the violin, and at the same time she found the time to pursue her "literary inclinations for a few hours a day".

=== Activist life, 1926–1931 ===
At this time at the latest, she also became part of the lesbian scene in Berlin and dealt with sexual science writings on female homosexuality. However, the exact time of her coming out is not known. Engler was described as a so-called "virile" homosexual woman and identified herself as a masculine lesbian woman, similar to the later emerging concept of a butch. Franz Scott, a contemporary author on the lesbian scene of the Weimar Republic, wrote about her nature that she "always had a distinguished masculine and serious swing", in 1929 she described herself with self-irony as "a pretty solid guy (who's laughing?)".

Engler's work as an activist began either in 1925 or 1926 (probably the latter) with the founding and editorship of the magazine Die BIF – Blätter Idealer Frauenfreundschaften ("Papers of ideal women's friendship"). Die BIF ceased publication after three monthly issues in 1927. Die BIF was unique among lesbian publications of the time as it was the first one published, edited and written solely by women; both competing magazines were dominated by men.

From 1927 to 1929, Engler contributed to the magazine Frauenliebe and from 1929 to 1931 to Die Freundin. Beside many texts related to her activist work her writings included, in particular, short fiction, poems and serial novels.

As an activist, Engler sought to improve the organization of lesbian women, following the lead of gay activists such as Friedrich Radszuweit and Carl Bergmann. She particularly asked lesbians to join Radszuweit's Bund für Menschenrecht.

In addition to her work as a writer, she organized ladies' clubs to allow lesbian women to gather without distraction. From 1926 to 1927, she ran the weekly "Damen-BIF-Klub", and in September 1929, she opened the ladies' club Erâto on the premises of the Zauberflöte, a well-known gay and lesbian venue. It appears to have been popular, as some of the club's events took place in venues with a capacity of some 600 persons. The club shut down after a few months and reopened in January 1931 on a smaller scale. It was last recorded as active in May 1931.

After May 1931, Engler is no longer recorded as being active in the lesbian movement. Her name or that of the club Erâto does not appear again in scene publications.

=== Life in the Third Reich ===
In 1933, Engler sent a play titled Heil Hitler directly to Adolf Hitler. As Engler never before or after showed any nationalist or antisemitic attitudes and never got involved with the NSDAP or any other national socialist organisations, this step is currently understood as either being an opportunistic step towards a writer's career or an attempt to show herself as a loyal citizen in view of her own past. The Reich Dramaturgist, Rainer Schlösser, approved of the play's ideology, but believed that it lacked artistic and dramatic merit. In 1933, 1938 and 1943, Engler filed an application for membership in the Reichsschrifttumskammer (RSK), part of the Reichskulturkammer, the state organization to which all artists were required to belong. Due to a lack of publications, her application was rejected. On the basis of the RSK-files, poems, prose texts, dramas and an opera libretto can be traced, she also gave occasional lectures, but none of her works has survived.

=== After the war ===
After the war, Engler continued to live in Berlin-Kreuzberg in the Ritterstrasse as a writer, however, there are no known publications. In 1956, she was briefly observed by the East German Stasi, whose report described her as "1.69m tall, of stable figure, has a full face and was carelessly dressed." At that time, she made a living by subletting. She moved at the beginning of the 1970s to Berlin-Marienfelde, where she died shortly thereafter in April 1972.

== Legacy ==
Already contemporary, Franz Scott saw Engler in an outstanding position as one of the pioneers of the lesbian movement alongside Lotte Hahm. According to him, she "had achieved a certain significance among homosexual women".

Alfred Döblin mounted a text passage of her novel Erkenntnis in a parodistic manner into a passage of his novel Berlin Alexanderplatz, where he deals with homosexual love. Döblin expert Gabriele Sander attests Engler a "highly trivial [...] Courths-Mahler style" in this context.

In an analysis of Englers novel Arme kleine Jett, Doris Claus emphasizes the emancipatory value of Englers literary work. By drawing a lesbian way of life without massive conflicts with social environment and society in the realistically drawn Berlin female artist milieu, she sketches a utopia and offers possibilities for identification.

Today, Engler is recognized above all for her activist activity as one of the "central and long-standing makers of the lesbian subculture in Berlin in the 1920s" and a "prominent lesbian fighter during the Weimar Republic". In 2015, the naming of a Berlin street after Engler was considered, but due to Engler's somewhat ambivalent behaviour during National Socialism, this was controversial, the naming did not take place.

== Works ==
- Erkenntnis 1927
- Das Leben ist nur noch im Rausch zu ertragen 1929, incomplete
- Arme kleine Jett 1930
- Kleine Novellen 1932

== See also ==
- LGBT history in Germany, 1890s–1934
