= Friedrich Radszuweit =

German LGBT activist (1876–1932)

Friedrich Radszuweit (15 April 1876 – 15 March 1932) was a German publisher, author and LGBT activist, who was of major importance to the first homosexual movement.

== Early life and career ==
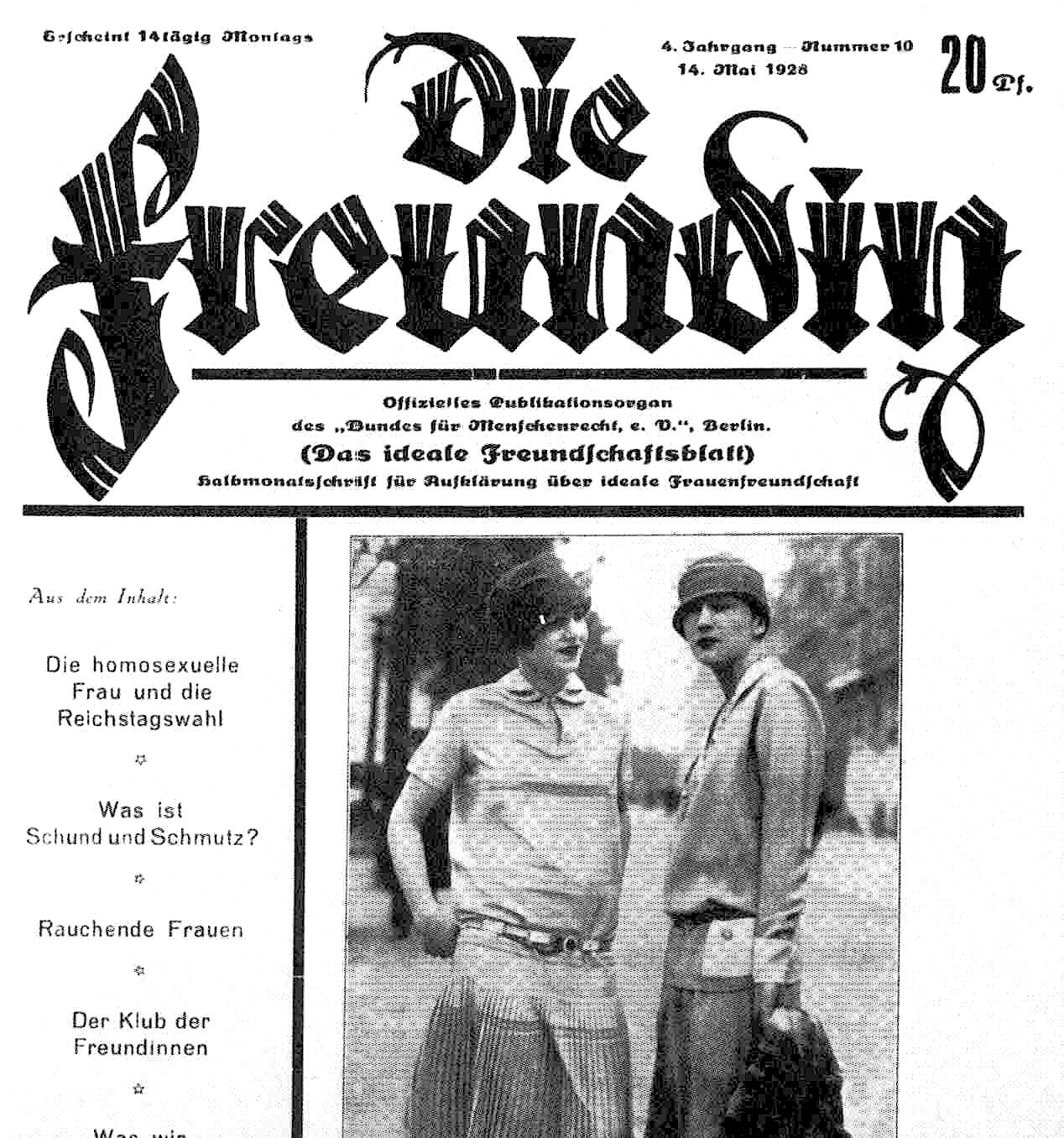
Die Freundin (May 1928)

Radszuweit was born in Klein-Stobingen, a small hamlet in Insterburg district, East Prussia, today located in Russia. He moved to Berlin in 1901 and opened a shop for women's clothes. In 1923, Radszuweit, who was gay, became president of the organisation Bund für Menschenrecht E.V. (BfM), which worked for the rights of gay people and for the deletion of Paragraph 175 in Germany. He started his own publishing company and published the monthly magazine Zeitschrift für Menschenrecht from 1923 to 1933. The company also published several LGBT books and homoerotic graphics.

The company also produced the first gramophone record with homosexual themes, including Bubi laß uns Freunde sein by Bruno Balz and Erwin Neuber. Other magazines published include Die Insel, Magazin der Einsamen (1926–1931), and the transvestite magazine Das 3. Geschlecht (five issues: 1930–1932). He also started the lesbian magazine Die Freundin, Wochenschrift für ideale Frauenfreundschaft.

Radszuweit wrote the novels Männer zu verkaufen, Ledige Frauen, Die Symphonie des Eros and Paul Tritzkis Lebensweg. In 1927, he produced a flyer for the members of the Reichstag advocating reform of § 175.

== Death ==
In April 1932, Radszuweit died in Berlin of a heart attack. His businesses were taken over at his death by his lover Martin Butzkow (1900–1933), whom he had adopted to allow him to be his heir.

== Works ==
- Männer zu verkaufen, Leipzig, Lipsia-Verlag, 1932, 6. edition
- Die Symphonie des Eros, Berlin-Pankow, Kaiser Friedrich-Str. 1, 1925
- Paul Titzkis Lebensweg, Berlin-Pankow, Kaiser-Friedrich-Str. 1, Orplid-publishing, 1924
