= History of gay rights =

History of gay rights is covered by multiple articles:

- LGBT history
- LGBT social movements
