= Abu'l-'Anbas Saymari =

Medieval Persian astrologer and astronomer

- ابوالعنباس صیمری
- Born: 828; Kufa
- Died: 889

Academic work
- Era: Islamic Golden Age
- Main interests: Astrology, poetry

Abu'l-'Anbas Saymari Mohammad bin Eshaq bin Abi'l-'Anbas bin Al-Maghira bin Mahan (Persian: ابوالعنباس صیمری; Arabic: أبو العنبس محمّد بن إسحاق بن إبراهيم الصيمري) was an Iranian astrologer, astronomer, poet and author. He was born in 213/828 in Kufa, and died in 275/889. He seems to have spent much of his time at the caliphal court from Motawakkel's reign (847 – 861) to Moʿtamed's (870 – 892). His great-great-grandfather's name, and his knowledge of the Sasanian astrologers Zaradūšt and Bozorjmehr, indicates that he was of Iranian origin.

== List of known works ==
- Ketāb al-radd ʿala’l-monaǰǰemīn (Book of the Refutation of Astrologers), lost;
- Ketāb aḥkām al-noǰūm (Book of Judgements of the Stars), lost;
- Ketāb al-madḵal elā ṣanāʿat al-tanǰīm (Book of the Introduction to the Art of Astrology), perhaps identical with no. 5;
- Ketāb al-mawālīd (Book of Nativities), lost;
- Ketāb al-madḵal elā ʿelm al-noǰūm (Book of the Introduction to the Science of the Stars);
- Ketāb fi’l-ḥesāb al-noǰūmī (Book on Stellar Computation);
- Al-Zīǰ.

== Sources ==
- Pingree, David (2011). "Abu'l-ʿanbas Ṣaymarī". Encyclopædia Iranica.
