= Timeline of transgender history =

Transgender history dates back to the first recorded instances of transgender individuals in ancient civilizations. However, the word transgenderism did not exist until 1965 when coined by psychiatrist John F. Oliven of Columbia University in his 1965 reference work Sexual Hygiene and Pathology; the timeline includes events and personalities that may be viewed as transgender in the broadest sense, including third gender and other gender-variant behavior, including ancient or modern precursors from the historical record.

== Before the Common Era ==
- c. 7,000 BCE – c. 1700 BCE – Among the sexual depictions in Neolithic and Bronze Age drawings and figurines from the Mediterranean are, as one author describes it, a "third sex" human figure having female breasts and male genitals or without distinguishing sex characteristics. In Neolithic Italy, female images are found in a domestic context, while images that combine sexual characteristics appear in burials or religious settings. In Neolithic Greece and Cyprus, figures are often dual-sexed or without identifying sexual characteristics.
- c. 2900 BCE – c. 2500 BCE – A burial of a suburb of Prague, Czech Republic, a male is buried in the outfit usually reserved for women. Archaeologists speculate that the burial corresponds to a transgender person or someone of the third sex.
- c. 400 BCE – Ancient Greek physician Hippocrates writes of the enarei, a class of androgynous Scythian priests and healers; "there are many eunuchs among the Scythians, who perform female work, and speak like women". The enarei are also mentioned around the same time in Herodotus' work Histories; "the Scythians who plundered the temple were punished by the goddess with the female sickness, which still attaches to their posterity. They themselves confess that they are afflicted with the disease for this reason, and travellers who visit Scythia can see what sort of a disease it is. Those who suffer from it are called Enarees".

== First millennium (1–1000) ==
- c. 1 – c. 100 – Philo of Alexandria and Marcus Manilius provided descriptions of transgender people during the early Roman Empire. Philo stated: "Expending every possible care on their outward adornment, they are not ashamed even to employ every device to change artificially their nature as men into women". He also attested that some members of this group, to that end, had their penises removed.
- 54 – Nero becomes Emperor of Rome. Nero married two men, Pythagoras and Sporus, in legal ceremonies, with Sporus accorded the regalia worn by the wives of the Caesars.
- 98 – Tacitus wrote in Germania that priests of the Swabian sub-tribe, the Naharvali or Nahanarvali, "dress as women" to perform their priestly duties.
- 218 – 222 – Roman emperor Elagabalus's reign begins. According to Cassius Dio, Elagabalus delighted in being called the mistress, wife, and queen of Hierocles, one of Elagabalus's lovers. The emperor wore makeup and wigs, preferred to be called a lady and not a lord, and offered vast sums to any physician who could provide the emperor with a vagina; for this reason, the emperor is seen by some writers as an early transgender figure and one of the first on record as seeking sex reassignment surgery.
- 576 – Death of Anastasia the Patrician who left life as a lady-in-waiting in the court of Justinian I in Constantinople to spend twenty-eight years (until death) dressed as a male monk in seclusion in Egypt, and has been adopted by today's LGBTQ community as an example of a "transgender" saint.

== 1001–1900 ==
- c. 1322 – Kalonymus ben Kalonymus composes a poem for Even Boḥan, a Jewish ethical treatise. The poem expresses discontent with having been born male instead of female. The poem, which was traditionally interpreted as a piece of satire, has sometimes been reinterpreted as a genuine expression of gender dysphoria.
- 1347 – Rolandina Roncaglia is tried for sodomy, an event that caused a sensation in Italy. She confessed she "had never had sexual intercourse, neither with (her) wife nor with any other woman, because (she) had never felt any carnal appetite, nor could (she) ever have an erection of (her) virile member". After her wife died of plague, Rolandina moved from Padua to Venice and started to live as a woman and prostituted herself, easily passing as a woman "since (she) has female look, voice and movements – although (she) does not have a female orifice, but has a male member and testicles – many persons considered (her) to be a woman because of (her) appearance". She was subsequently convicted of sodomy by the Lords of the Night and burned on 20 March 1354.
- 1395 – John Rykener, known also as Johannes Richer and Eleanor, was a transvestite prostitute working mainly in London (near Cheapside), but also active in Oxford. He was arrested in 1395 for cross-dressing and interrogated.
- 1460 – An unnamed individual claiming to be both a man and a woman is burned in Lille on 16 March this year as a cross-dressing man after being decided by judges to be such rather than a hermaphrodite, sentenced to death on the grounds of having done so to have sex with several young men.
- 1460 – Margarida Borràs, a trans woman, is hanged in Valencia for sodomy on 28 July this year. Today, an award for the defense of LGBT rights and a public square in Valencia have been named after her.
- 1498 – An unnamed trans woman, a Moor, was executed as a man for transvestism in Rome on 7 April this year, wearing "(her) usual women's clothes … (she) was placed on a bundle of wood and strangled at the column of the gallows" and subsequently burned.
- 1537 – An unnamed trans man was tried and drowned as a woman for wearing male clothing at Krenzach am Horn near Basel on 24 September this year. He had lived as a man for several years, working as a peasant, and eventually married a "pretty daughter" who remained faithful to him despite him becoming physically abusive towards her. He later was imprisoned in Röttallen after a theft, "where, during (his) torture and racking, it was discovered (he) was a woman."
- 1542 – Alvar Nuñez Cabeza de Vaca documents same sex marriages and men "who dress like women and perform the office of women, but use the bow and carry big loads" among a Native American tribe in his publication, The Journey of Alvar Nuñez Cabeza de Vaca and His Companions from Florida to the Pacific 1528–1536.
- 1561 – The trial of Wojciech Skwarski, who married Sebastian Słodownik, and lived with him for two years in Poznań. Both had female partners. On their return to Kraków after Słodownik's death, they married Wawrzyniec Włoszek. Wojciech, who lived as and was considered in public opinion to be a woman since 1550, was burned for 'crimes against nature' for having relationships with other women.

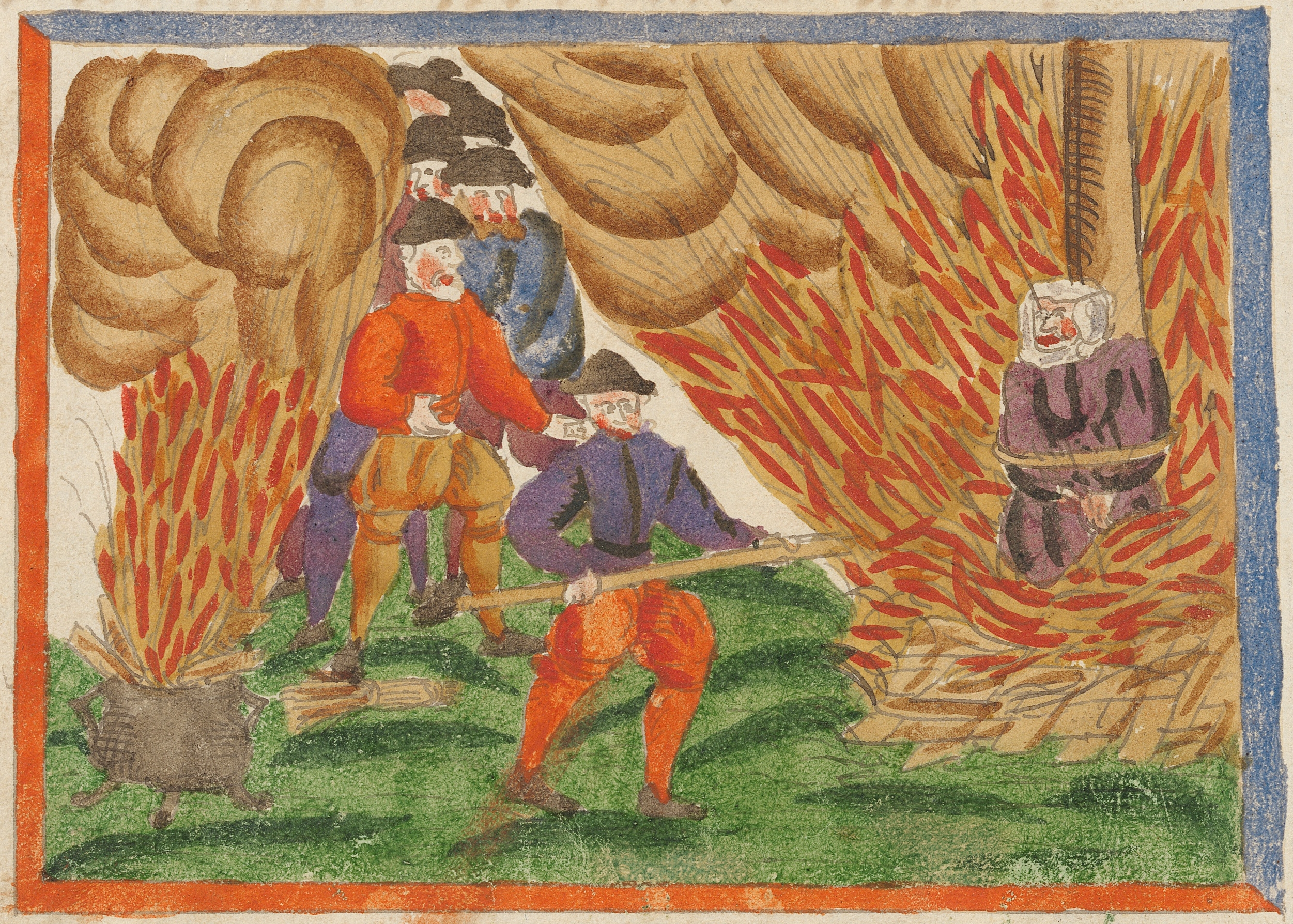
Execution of Barbara Brunner in Lenzburg, 1586

- 1586 – Barbara Brunner of Küsnacht, living in Lenzburg, was discovered to "be male under (her) clothes" and is burned at the stake on 28 May that year; a man was also burned for sodomy the same day between Lenzburg and Aarau, but it is unknown if the two executions were related. The executions were recorded in the chronicles of Johann Jakob Wick.
- 1629 – Thomas(ine) Hall is ordered by the Quarter Court of Jamestown, Virginia to wear a combination of male and female attire after a series of incidents led to Hall submitting to physical examination and the Court determining Hall to have a "dual nature" gender; it is likely that Hall was intersex as well as non-binary.
- 1776 – After recovering from a fever, a preacher in New England claimed to have died and started calling themselves the "Public Universal Friend" eschewing use of gendered pronouns and identification as either male or female.
- 1777 – The Chevalier d'Éon, an androgynous French courtier and spy of disputed gender identity, agrees with a request by French authorities to live and present as a woman.
- 1781 – Jens Andersson of Norway, assigned female at birth but identifying as male, was imprisoned and put on trial after marrying Anne Kristine Mortensdotter in a Lutheran church. When asked about his gender, the response was "Hand troer at kunde henhøre til begge Deele" ("He believes he belongs to both").
- 1836 – Mary Jones, a transgender African-American sex worker, is placed on trial in New York City after allegedly pickpocketing a client. The case received significant press attention, and she was depicted in a published lithograph entitled "the Man-Monster".
- 1871 – The hijra (a term used in South Asia to refer to eunuchs, intersex, or transgender people) are defined by the colonial authorities of the British Raj as a "criminal tribe" alongside various other social groups following the enactment of the Criminal Tribes Act, imposing state surveillance and restrictions on free movement.
- 1876 – Frances Thompson, a former African-American slave who had ten years earlier testified before the U.S. Congress on having been raped during the Memphis riots of 1866 amid the Reconstruction era in the former Confederate States of America, is arrested for "being a man dressed in women's clothing".
- 1895 – The Countess, a French transgender courtesan and singer, published her autobiography The Secret Confessions of a Parisian: The Countess, 1850-1871.
- 1895 – The Cercle Hermaphroditos, the earliest known transgender organization in the United States, was reportedly founded in this year according to Jennie June.

== 20th century ==
=== First half ===
- 1906 – Karl M. Baer, in December 1906, becomes the first transgender person to undergo sex reassignment surgery.
- 1907 – The word 'transsexual' is used to mean between or applicable to both men and women (modern usage of this and related words develops later, see 1931 onwards).
- 1913 – English sexologist Havelock Ellis (known for his writings on homosexuality) coins the term "sexo-aesthetic inversion" to refer to a phenomenon "by which, a person's tastes and impulses are so altered, that if a man, he emphasizes and even exaggerates the feminine characteristics in his own person". He would later use the term "eonism", named for the aforementioned Chevalier d'Éon, to refer to this phenomenon.
- 1919 – In Berlin, Germany, Doctor Magnus Hirschfeld co-founds the Institut für Sexualwissenschaft (Institute for Sex Research), a pioneering private research institute and counseling office. Its library of thousands of books was destroyed by Nazis in May 1933.
- 1923 – Hirschfeld introduces the (German) term "Transsexualismus".
- 1930 – Lili Elbe had received emasculation and ovary transplant in June 1930. She changed her legal gender in October 1930.
- 1931 – In Berlin in 1931, Dora Richter became the first known transgender woman to undergo vaginoplasty.
- 1931 – Lili Elbe received vaginoplasty and uterus transplant. Immune system rejection of the transplanted uterus caused her death.
- 1931 – Toni Ebel and her partner Charlotte Charlaque, received vaginoplasty and became first transsexed couple. They were involuntarily separated but lived until other trans women received sexual reassignment surgery and public attention after World War II.
- 1933 – Nazis burn the library of Magnus Hirschfeld's Institute for Sexual Research, and destroy the institute.
- 1934 – In February 1934, Dora Richter applied for a legal name change, granted by the president of Czechoslovakia in April 1934. She lives until 1966.
- 1941
  - The first use of the English word transsexuality in print recorded in the Oxford English Dictionary indicates the word is already in use, regarded by that author as a rarer synonym for homosexuality; the first use in print in a modern sense that the dictionary records is in 1950.
  - Barbara Ann Wilcox, a transgender woman, successfully petitions Los Angeles County Superior Court to change her legal name, in one of the earliest known legal cases of its kind.
- 1946 – Plastic surgeon Harold Gillies carries out female-to-male sex reassignment surgery on Michael Dillon in Britain.

=== 1950s ===
- 1950s – Rina Natan becomes the first known transsexual woman in Israel to undergo sex reassignment surgery. The surgery was conducted as an emergency operation after she attempted to perform it on herself; This came after her unsuccessful campaign to change Israeli policy to allow for sex reassignment surgeries. After the incident, the Israeli government did change its policy.
- 1952 – David Oliver Cauldwell uses the term "trans-sexual" in English (in its modern meaning) based on an earlier German term, having introduced "transsexualism" in 1949.
- 1952 – Christine Jorgensen becomes the first widely publicized person to have undergone sex reassignment surgery, in this case male to female, creating a world-wide sensation.
- 1953
  - Glen or Glenda, an American film featuring transgender surgery and transvestism, is released. A promotional poster for the film advertised that it would include a character that had changed sex.
  - Danish endocrinologist Christian Hamburger publishes one of the earliest reports on hormone therapy in transgender women, effective pharmaceutical female sex-hormonal medications having been available since the 1920s and 1930s.
- 1954 – The gender transition of Roberta Cowell, a British pilot during World War II, is reported internationally by the Associated Press. She also appeared that month on the cover of Picture Post, a then-popular magazine in the United Kingdom.
- 1957 – The term "Transsexual" is used by U.S. physician Harry Benjamin in a public lecture.
- 1959 – The Cooper Do-nuts Riot occurs at Cooper's Do-nuts in Los Angeles, US; rioters were arrested by LAPD. Transgender women, lesbian women, drag queens, and gay men riot, one of the first LGBTQ uprisings in the US. It is viewed by some historians as the first modern LGBT uprising in the United States.

=== 1960s ===
- 1965 – The term transgenderism is coined by psychiatrist John F. Oliven of Columbia University in his 1965 reference work Sexual Hygiene and Pathology.
- 1966 – The Compton's Cafeteria Riot occurred in August 1966 by transgender women and Vanguard members in the Tenderloin district of San Francisco. This incident was one of the first recorded transgender riots in United States history, preceding the more famous 1969 Stonewall Riots in New York City by three years.
- 1968 – According to the online encyclopedia glbtq.com, "In the aftermath of the riot at Compton's, a network of transgender social, psychological, and medical support services was established, which culminated in 1968 with the creation of the National Transsexual Counseling Unit [NTCU], the first such peer-run support and advocacy organization in the world".
- 1969
  - The Stonewall riots occur in New York City.
  - Funeral Parade of Roses, a Japanese drama art film, is released. It features Tokyo's underground gay and transgender subcultures.

=== 1970s ===
- 1970
  - Street Transvestite Action Revolutionaries (STAR), a transgender and gender non-conforming activist organization, is founded in New York City by Sylvia Rivera and Marsha P. Johnson in the wake of the Stonewall uprising.
  - A "male homosexual" group presents eighteen demands to the Revolutionary People's Constitutional Convention, one of which is the "right to free physiological change and modification of sex".
- c. 1970 – 1973 – "There are as many sexes as there are people" was a popular slogan in London's Gay Liberation Front (GLF) during this time; It relates to both cross-dressers and transsexuals. A subgroup called the "Transvestite, Transsexual and Drag Queen Group" was also formed within the GLF.
- 1972 – Sweden becomes the first country in the world to allow transgender people to legally change their sex, and provides free hormone therapy;
- 1974
  - Chile allows a trans woman, Marcia Torres, to legally change her name and gender on the birth certificate after undergoing sex reassignment surgery, becoming the second country in the world to do so.
  - Angela Morley became the first openly transgender person to be nominated for an Academy Award, when she was nominated for one in the category of Best Music, Original Song Score/Adaptation for The Little Prince (1974), a nomination shared with Alan Jay Lerner, Frederick Loewe, and Douglas Gamley.
  - Conundrum, by Jan Morris, was the first widely sold autobiography published by a transgender woman detailing her experience.
- 1975
  - Minneapolis becomes the first city in the United States to pass trans-inclusive civil rights protection legislation.
- 1976
  - Renée Richards competes in the US Open; she is one of the first prominent transgender athletes in the United States.

=== 1980s ===
- 1980
  - The Human Rights Campaign Fund is founded by Steve Endean; the Human Rights Campaign is now America's largest civil rights organization working to achieve lesbian, gay, bisexual and transgender equality.
  - The gender identity disorder in children (GIDC) diagnosis is introduced in the DSM-III; prior to the DSM-III's publication in 1980, there was no diagnostic criteria for gender dysphoria.
- 1985 – France prohibits discrimination based on lifestyle (moeurs) in employment and services.
- 1986 – Lou Sullivan founds the FTM International, the oldest organization specifically for trans men in the United States.
- 1986 (or 1987) – Trans woman Maryam Khatoon Molkara meets with supreme leader of Iran Ruhollah Khomeini, leading him to issue a fatwa to allow Gender-affirming surgery in Iran.

=== 1990s ===
- 1992 – Althea Garrison was elected as the first transgender state legislator in America, and served one term in the Massachusetts House of Representatives. It was not publicly known that she was transgender when she was elected.
- 1993 – US state of Minnesota enacts gender identity anti-discrimination legislation.
- 1995 – The Human Rights Campaign drops the word "Fund" from their title and broadens their mission to promote "an America where gay, lesbian, bisexual and transgender people are ensured equality and embraced as full members of the American family at home, at work and in every community;"
- 1998
  - Gender identity was added to the mission of Parents and Friends of Lesbians and Gays after a vote at their annual meeting in San Francisco. Parents and Friends of Lesbians and Gays is the first national LGBT organization to officially adopt a transgender-inclusion policy for its work.
  - Dana International became the first trans person to win the Eurovision Song Contest, representing Israel with the song "Diva".
  - Parinya Charoenphol becomes the first kathoey (transgender) Muay Thai boxing champion.
- 1999 – The Transgender Day of Remembrance was founded in 1999 by Gwendolyn Ann Smith, a trans woman who is a graphic designer, columnist, and activist, to memorialize the murder of Rita Hester in Allston, Massachusetts. Since its inception, TDoR has been held annually on 20 November, and it has slowly evolved from the web-based project started by Smith into an international day of action.

== 2000s ==
2000

- The Transgender Pride flag was first shown, at a pride parade in Phoenix, Arizona.

2001

- Anti-discrimination legislation (gender identity): US state of Rhode Island
- Transcendence Gospel Choir, the first known transgender choir, was founded in San Francisco.

2002

- Canada's Northwest Territories became the first jurisdiction in Canada to ban discrimination based on gender identity; the remaining provinces all would by 2017.
- Parents and Friends of Lesbians and Gays established its Transgender Network, also known as TNET, as its first official "Special Affiliate", recognized with the same privileges and responsibilities as its regular chapters.
- At the Reform seminary Hebrew Union College-Jewish Institute of Religion in New York, the Reform rabbi Margaret Wenig organized the first school-wide seminar at any rabbinical school which addressed the psychological, legal, and religious issues affecting people who are intersex or transsexual.
- In December 2002, the British Lord Chancellor's office published a Government Policy Concerning Transsexual People document that categorically states, "What transsexualism is not ... It is not a mental illness."

2003

- Reuben Zellman became the first openly transgender person accepted to the Hebrew Union College-Jewish Institute of Religion, where he was ordained in 2010.
- The Committee on Jewish Law and Standards approved a rabbinic ruling that concluded that sex reassignment surgery (SRS) is permissible as a treatment of gender dysphoria, and that a transgender person's sex status under Jewish law is changed by SRS.
- Legal recognition of indeterminate gender: Alex MacFarlane became the first person reported to obtain a birth certificate and passport, in Australia, showing indeterminate gender.
- Jennifer Finney Boylan's autobiography, She's Not There: A Life in Two Genders, was the first book by an openly transgender American to become a bestseller. Preceded by Conundrum, by Jan Morris in 1974.

2004

- The first all-transgender performance of The Vagina Monologues was held. The monologues were read by eighteen notable transgender women, and a new monologue revolving around the experiences and struggles of transgender women was included.
- Luna, by Julie Anne Peters, was published, and was the first young-adult novel with a transgender character to be released by a mainstream publisher.

2005

- The first European Transgender Council Meeting was held in Vienna.

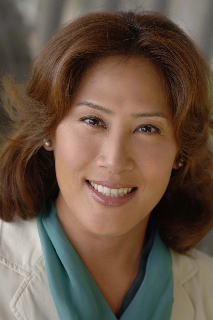
In 2006 Kim Coco Iwamoto became the first transgender official to win statewide office in Hawaii.

2006

- Anti-discrimination legislation for gender identity: Germany, New Jersey, New Zealand, Washington, and Washington, D.C.
- Elliot Kukla, who came out as transgender six months before his ordination in 2006, was the first openly transgender person to be ordained by the Hebrew Union College-Jewish Institute of Religion.
- Kim Coco Iwamoto became the first transgender official to win statewide office in Hawaii.

2007

- Anti-discrimination legislation for gender identity: the US states of Colorado, Iowa Kansas, Michigan, Ohio, Oregon and Vermont.
- Candis Cayne played Carmelita Rainer, a transgender woman having an affair with married New York Attorney General Patrick Darling (played by William Baldwin), on the ABC prime time drama Dirty Sexy Money. The role made Cayne the first openly transgender actress to play a recurring transgender character in prime time.
- Joy Ladin became the first openly transgender professor at an Orthodox institution (Stern College for Women of Yeshiva University).
- Amaranta Gómez Regalado (for México Posible) became the first trans person in the Mexican Congress.
- Theresa Sparks was elected president of the San Francisco Police Commission by a single vote, making her the first openly transgender person ever to be elected president of any San Francisco commission, as well as San Francisco's highest ranking openly transgender official.

2008

- Silverton, Oregon elected Stu Rasmussen as the first openly transgender mayor in America.
- Angie Zapata, a transgender woman, was murdered in Greeley, Colorado. Allen Andrade was convicted of first-degree murder and committing a bias-motivated crime, because he killed her after he learned that she was transgender. This case was the first in the nation to get a conviction for a hate crime involving a transgender victim. Angie Zapata's story and murder were featured on Univision's "Aqui y Ahora" television show on 1 November 2009.
- The first ever U.S. Congressional hearing on discrimination against transgender people in the workplace was held, by the House Subcommittee on Health, Employment, Labor, and Pensions.

2009

- The International Transgender Day of Visibility was founded by Michigan-based transgender activist Rachel Crandall Crocker in 2009 as a reaction to the lack of LGBT holidays celebrating transgender people, citing the frustration that the only well-known transgender-centered holiday was the Transgender Day of Remembrance which mourned the loss of transgender people to hate crimes, but did not acknowledge and celebrate living members of the transgender community.
- Diego Sanchez became the first openly transgender person to work on Capitol Hill; he was hired as a legislative assistant for Barney Frank. Sanchez was also the first transgender person on the Democratic National Committee's (DNC) Platform Committee in 2008.
- Barbra "Babs" Siperstein was nominated and confirmed as an at-large member of the Democratic National Committee, becoming its first openly transgender member.
- In May 2009, the government of France declared that a transsexual gender identity would no longer be classified as a psychiatric condition, but according to French trans rights organizations, beyond the impact of the announcement itself, nothing changed.

== 2010s ==
=== 2010 ===
- Tyler McCormick became the first openly transgender man (and the first wheelchair user, and the first person from New Mexico) to win International Mr. Leather.
- After a lawsuit filed by golfer Lana Lawless, the rules of the LPGA were changed in 2010 to allow transgender competitors.
- Guinness World Records recognized transgender man Thomas Beatie as the world's "First Married Man to Give Birth".
- Amanda Simpson became the first openly transgender presidential appointee in America when she was appointed as senior technical adviser in the Commerce Department's Bureau of Industry and Security.
- Kye Allums became the first openly transgender athlete to play in NCAA basketball. He was a transgender man who played on George Washington University's women's team.
- Phyllis Frye became the first openly transgender judge appointed in the United States.

=== 2011 ===
- Chaz Bono appeared on the 13th season of the US version of Dancing with the Stars in 2011. This was the first time an openly transgender man starred on a major network television show for something unrelated to being transgender.
- Harmony Santana became the first openly transgender actress to receive a major acting award nomination; she was nominated by the Independent Spirit Awards as Best Supporting Actress for the movie Gun Hill Road.
- Jaiyah "Johnny" Saelua became the first openly transgender international footballer to play in the World Cup when she took the field for American Samoa in Oceania's first round of World Cup qualifiers for Brazil 2014.

=== 2012 ===
- Anti-discrimination legislation for gender identity: Chile, Canadian province of Manitoba
- Anti-discrimination legislation for gender expression: Ontario
- The U.S. Dept. of Housing and Urban Development's Office of Fair Housing and Equal Opportunity issued a regulation to prohibit LGBT discrimination in federally assisted housing programs. The new regulations ensure that the Department's core housing programs are open to all eligible persons, regardless of sexual orientation or gender identity.
- Emily Aviva Kapor, an American rabbi who had been ordained privately by a "Conservadox" rabbi in 2005, began living as a woman in 2012, thus becoming the first openly transgender female rabbi.
- Rainbow Jews, an oral history project showcasing the lives of Jewish bisexual, lesbian, gay, and transgender people in the United Kingdom from the 1950s until the present, was launched. It is the United Kingdom's first archive of Jewish bisexual, lesbian, gay, and transgender history.
- Donald Trump intervened to allow Jenna Talackova (a transgender woman and legally recognized as female in Canada) to compete in Miss Universe Canada 2012, a beauty pageant he then owned. In the contest, Talackova placed Top 12.
- Stacie Laughton became the first openly transgender person elected to any American state legislature when she won a seat in the New Hampshire House of Representatives. However, she resigned from the New Hampshire state legislature before she took office, after it was revealed that she had served four months in Belknap County House of Corrections following a 2008 credit card fraud conviction.
- San Francisco voted to become the first U.S. city to provide and cover the cost of sex reassignment surgeries for uninsured transgender residents.

=== 2013 ===
- Anti-discrimination legislation for gender identity: Cyprus, Puerto Rico, US state of Delaware
- Anti-discrimination legislation for gender expression: Canadian provinces of Newfoundland and Labrador and Prince Edward Island
- Nikki Sinclaire came out as transgender, thus becoming the United Kingdom's first openly transgender Parliamentarian.
- The first United Nations ministerial meeting on the rights of lesbian, gay, bisexual and transgender individuals was held.
- Fallon Fox came out as transgender, thus becoming the first openly transgender athlete in mixed martial arts history.
- Philadelphia passed one of the most comprehensive transgender rights bills on the city level, which addresses transgender bathroom use and city employee healthcare, making it the first city on the east coast to provide transition related healthcare to its city employees.
- Autumn Sandeen, a U.S. veteran and transgender woman, received a letter from a Navy official stating, "Per your request the Defense Enrollment Eligibility Reporting System (DEERS) has been updated to show your gender as female effective 12 April 2013." Allyson Robinson of Outserve declared, "To our knowledge, this is the first time that the Department of Defense has recognized and affirmed a change of gender for anyone affiliated, in a uniformed capacity—in this case a military retiree."
- Ben Barres became the first openly transgender scientist in the US National Academy of Sciences in 2013.
- For the first time, the California Department of Education's list of recommended books for grades Pre-K-through-12 included a book with a transgender theme, I Am J by Cris Beam.
- California enacted America's first law protecting transgender students. The School Success and Opportunity Act extends gender identity and gender expression discrimination protection to transgender and gender-nonconforming K-12 students in public schools
- Jennifer Pritzker came out as transgender in 2013 and thus became the world's first openly transgender billionaire.
- A six-year-old girl named Luana, who was assigned male at birth, became the first transgender child in Argentina to have her new name officially changed on her identity documents. She is believed to be the youngest to benefit from the country's new Gender Identity Law, which was approved in May 2012.
- Jennifer Finney Boylan was chosen as the first openly transgender co-chair of GLAAD's National Board of Directors.
- On 31 October 2013 Paris Lees became the first openly transgender panellist to appear on the BBC's Question Time programme, drawing praise from commentators who included former Deputy Prime Minister John Prescott and the Labour Party deputy leader Harriet Harman.
- Stephen Alexander, of Rhode Island, became the first high school coach to come out publicly as transgender.
- On 1 November Audrey Gauthier was elected president of CUPE 4041, representing Air Transat flight attendants based in Montreal. She thus became the first openly transgender person elected president of a union local in Canada.
- Q Radio, which went on the airwaves in September, claims to be India's first radio station which caters to the country's lesbians, gays, bisexuals and transgender people.
- San Francisco's first Project Homeless Connect for lesbian, gay, bisexual, and transgender people was held.
- The diagnostic label gender identity disorder (GID) was used until 2013's release of the diagnostic manual DSM-5. The condition was renamed to gender dysphoria to remove the stigma associated with the term disorder. The DSM-5 also moved this diagnosis out of the sexual disorders category and into a category of its own.

=== 2014 ===
- Anti-discrimination law for gender identity: Canadian province Saskatchewan
- The U.S. Equal Employment Opportunity Commission filed the first Title VII action taken by the federal government on behalf of transgender workers. The lawsuits were filed for Amiee Stephens and Brandi Branson, both transgender women.
- Meghan Stabler became the first openly transgender woman to be named Working Mother magazine's Working Mother of the Year.
- Laverne Cox was on the cover of 9 June 2014 issue of Time, and was interviewed for the article "The Transgender Tipping Point". She also became the first openly transgender person to be nominated for an Emmy in an acting category: Outstanding Guest Actress in a Comedy Series for her role as Sophia Burset in Orange Is the New Black.
- Transgender Studies Quarterly, the first non-medical academic journal devoted to transgender issues, began publication, with Susan Stryker and Paisley Currah as coeditors.
- Mills College became the first single-sex college in the U.S. to adopt a policy explicitly welcoming transgender students, Mount Holyoke became the first Seven Sisters college to accept transgender students.
- Blake Brockington became the first openly transgender high school homecoming king in North Carolina.
- Nina Chaubal and Greta Gustava Martela cofounded Trans Lifeline, the first U.S. suicide hotline dedicated to transgender people.
- Tona Brown became the first African-American openly transgender woman to perform at Carnegie Hall.
- The Transgender Trends panel was the first panel on that subject ever held at San Diego Comic-Con.
- The San Francisco Police academy graduated its first openly transgender police officer, Mikayla Connell.
- The 100 block of Turk Street in San Francisco was renamed Vicki Mar Lane after trans activist Vicki Marlane.
- Lea T became the face of American hair-care brand Redken, thus making her the first openly transgender model to front a global cosmetics brand.
- A national Centers for Disease Control and Prevention campaign featured an openly transgender person, Jennifer Barge, as its spokesperson for the first time.
- Chris Mosier became the first openly transgender man inducted into the National Gay and Lesbian Sports Hall of Fame.
- Kinnon MacKinnon became the first openly transgender man to earn a gold in powerlifting at the Gay Games in the 2014 Games.
- BBC2 commissioned Britain's first transgender sitcom, called Boy Meets Girl, which follows the developing relationship between Leo, a 26-year-old man and Judy, a 40-year-old transgender woman.
- ICEIS Rain became the first openly two-spirit person to perform at the Aboriginal Peoples Choice Music Awards.
- Padmini Prakash became India's first openly transgender television news anchor.
- Denmark became the first European country to remove the Gender Identity Disorder diagnosis as a necessary requirement in the gender recognition process.
- Malta became the first European state to add recognition of gender identity to its constitution as a protected category.
- The first openly transgender woman got married in Malta.
- At least 1,000 openly transgender Bangladeshis held Bangladesh's first pride march, to mark one year since the government recognized them as a third gender.
- The Arizona Interscholastic Association Executive Board approved the first transgender student-athlete to play in a winter sport in Arizona.
- The FTM Fitness Conference hosted the first bodybuilding competition for transgender men, the FTM Fitness World Bodybuilding Competition.
- The UN Human Rights Council adopted a second resolution related to sexual orientation and gender identity on 26 September 2014. It passed by a vote of 25-14 and is the first time in the Council's history that it adopted a resolution on LGBT rights with the majority of its members.
- Petra De Sutter became the first openly transgender person to serve in Belgium's Parliament, specifically its Senate.
- Luisa Revilla Urcia became the first openly transgender person elected to a public office in Peru when she won a seat on the local council in La Esperanza in the province of Trujillo in northwestern Peru.
- The Labor government in Victoria, Australia appointed Martin Foley as Minister of equality, marking the first time an Australian government has ever had a dedicated Minister overseeing gay, lesbian, bisexual, transgender and intersex issues.
- Vered Meltzer was elected to the City Council in Appleton; as such he became the first openly transgender elected official in Wisconsin.
- Butterfly Music Transgender Chorus, the U.S.'s second known transgender chorus, was founded, inspiring others to found similar groups in cities across the country.

=== 2015 ===
No date

- Anti-discrimination law for gender identity and gender expression: Canadian province of Alberta.

January

- Madhu Kinnar became India's first openly transgender person to be elected mayor; she was elected mayor of Chhattisgarh's Raigarh Municipal Corporation.
- Zoey Tur joined Inside Edition as a Special Correspondent during February, thus becoming the first openly transgender television reporter on national TV in America.

February

- Pennsylvania State Representative Mark B. Cohen introduced the first transgender rights bills in Pennsylvania's history.

March

- The inaugural White House Trans Women Of Color Women's History Month Briefing was held.
- The U.S. Justice Department announced that it had filed its first civil lawsuit on behalf of a transgender person (Rachel Tudor); the lawsuit was United States of America v. Southeastern Oklahoma State University and the Regional University System of Oklahoma, filed in federal court in that state.

April

- In a first for the state, California's Department of Corrections was ordered by a federal judge to grant a transgender prisoner (Michelle-Lael Norsworthy) access to gender-affirming surgery.
- Andreja Pejic became the first openly transgender model profiled by Vogue, in its May 2015 issue.
- Laverne Cox (among others) posed nude for the Allure annual "Nudes" issue, becoming the first openly transgender actress to do so. She also became the first openly transgender person to have a wax figure of herself at Madame Tussauds. She also won a Daytime Emmy Award in Outstanding Special Class Special as Executive Producer for Laverne Cox Presents: The T Word. This made her the first openly transgender woman to win a Daytime Emmy as an Executive Producer; as well, The T Word is the first trans documentary to win a Daytime Emmy.
- Scott Turner Schofield became the first openly transgender actor to play a major role on daytime television, as the character Nick on the show The Bold and the Beautiful. On the same show, the character Maya Avant (played by Karla Mosley) became the first transgender bride to be married on daytime television when she married Rick Forrester (played by Jacob Young).
- Maka Brown, an 18-year-old senior at the Salt Lake School for Performing Arts, was crowned Utah's first openly transgender prom queen.

May

- When President Obama declared May to be National Foster Care Month in 2015, he became the first president to explicitly say gender identity should not prevent anyone from adopting or becoming a foster parent.
- Abby Stein came out as transgender and thus became the first openly transgender woman (and the first woman) to have been ordained by an ultra-Orthodox institution, having received her rabbinical degree in 2011 from Yeshiva Viznitz in South Fallsburg, New York. However, this was before she was openly transgender, and she is no longer working as a rabbi as of 2016. She is also the first openly transgender woman raised in a Hasidic community, and is a direct descendant of Hasidic Judaism's founder the Baal Shem Tov.

June

- Loiza Lamers won "Holland's Next Top Model", making her the first openly transgender winner of the "Top Model" franchise.
- Philadelphia flew the transgender pride flag above City Hall for the first time.
- Caitlyn Jenner became the first openly transgender woman on the cover of Vanity Fair.
- Chris Mosier became the first known out trans athlete to join a U.S. national team that matched his gender identity, rather than the gender assigned him at birth, when he won a spot on Team USA in the men's sprint duathalon.
- Manabi Bandopadhyay, India's first openly transgender college principal, began work; she worked as the principal of the Krishnagar Women's College in Nadia district.
- Breanna Sinclairé became the first openly transgender person to sing the national anthem at a professional sporting event, which she did at a Major League Baseball game.
- Audrey Middleton became the U.S. television show Big Brother's first openly transgender houseguest.

July

- Aydian Dowling became the first openly transgender man on the cover of Men's Health magazine, as part of a special collector's edition.
- Jacob Anderson-Minshall became the first openly transgender author to win a Goldie award from the Golden Crown Literary Society; he shared the award for best creative non-fiction book with Diane Anderson-Minshall for Queerly Beloved: A Love Story Across Genders.

August

- Schools In Transition: A Guide for Supporting Transgender Students in K-12 Schools was introduced; it is a first-of-its-kind publication for school administrations, teachers, and parents about how to provide safe and supportive environments for all transgender students in kindergarten through twelfth grade.
- Hari Nef became the first openly transgender model signed to IMG.
- President Obama appointed Raffi Freedman-Gurspan to serve as an Outreach and Recruitment Director in the Presidential Personnel Office, making her the first openly transgender appointee to work inside the White House.
- The (American) Department of Veterans Affairs opened its first clinic for transgender service members.

September

- Andrew Guy became Australia's first openly transgender TV host, as a guest presenter on The Project.
- Nepal adopted its first democratic constitution, which is the first in Asia to specifically protect the rights of lesbian, gay, bisexual and transgender communities.

October

- The first Oscar campaigns for openly transgender actresses supported by a movie producer were launched for actresses Kitana Kiki Rodriguez and Mya Taylor of the movie Tangerine.
- EastEnders chose Riley Carter Millington as the first openly transgender actor in UK TV soap history; he played 'Kyle', a man who has transitioned from female to male, which Riley did in real life. Shortly after, Hollyoaks cast transgender actress Annie Wallace.
- A transgender man's phalloplasty became the first ever seen on camera, in the Channel 4 documentary Girls to Men.

November

- The first U.S. congressional forum on anti-transgender violence was held.

December

- Mya Taylor won the Gotham Award for Breakthrough Actor, making her the first openly transgender actress to win a Gotham award.
- Tamara Adrian was elected to the Venezuelan National Assembly, thus becoming the first openly transgender Venezuelan to be elected to their national legislature, as well as the first openly transgender person in the entire Western Hemisphere to do so.

=== 2016 ===
January

- Through her Foundation, Jennifer Pritzker gave a $2 million donation to create the world's first endowed academic chair of transgender studies, at the University of Victoria in British Columbia; Aaron Devor was chosen as the inaugural chair. The United Nations voted to create their first LGBT human rights watchdog.

February

- Caitlyn Jenner became the first openly transgender person on the cover of Sports Illustrated.
- Mya Taylor became the first openly transgender actor to win an Independent Spirit Award; she won for Best Supporting Female.

March

- Israel held its first transgender beauty pageant, which was called "Miss Trans Israel", and was held at a club in Tel Aviv.
- President Barack Obama appointed Raffi Freedman-Gurspan as the White House's primary LGBT liaison, making her the first openly transgender person in the role.
- Nisha Ayub received the International Women of Courage Award in 2016, becoming the first openly transgender woman to receive that award.
- Aiden Katri, 19, became the first Israeli transgender woman to be jailed for refusing to serve in the military.

April

- Trans United Fund was founded; it is the first group of its kind, a 501(c)(4) organization of transgender leaders focused on transgender issues.

May

- Geraldine Roman became the first openly transgender woman elected to Congress in the Philippines.
- Anwen Muston was elected to Wolverhampton City Council, making her the first openly transgender woman to be elected as a Labour representative.

June

- Amelia Gapin became the first openly transgender woman to be featured on the cover of Women's Running.
- On 10 June 2016, an Oregon circuit court ruled that a resident, Elisa Rae Shupe, could obtain a non-binary gender designation. The Transgender Law Center believes this to be "the first ruling of its kind in the U.S."
- On 10 June 2016, the National Assembly of Quebec passed a bill to amend the Quebec Charter of Human Rights and Freedoms to prohibit discrimination based on gender identity or expression.
- Chris Mosier was chosen as the first openly transgender athlete to be featured in the "Body Issue" of ESPN The Magazine, and appeared in Nike's first ad with an openly transgender athlete.
- It was announced on 30 June 2016 that, beginning on that date, otherwise qualified United States service members could not any longer be discharged, denied reenlistment, involuntarily separated, or denied continuation of service because of being transgender.

July

- Misty Plowright became the first openly transgender candidate to win a major party primary for the US House of Representatives.
- An important legal victory for transgender people occurred in April 2016, when the 4th U.S. Circuit Court of Appeals ruled in favor of transgender male student Gavin Grimm, which marked the first ruling by a U.S. appeals court to find that transgender students are protected under federal laws that ban sex-based discrimination. The ruling came on a challenge to the Gloucester County School Board's policy of making transgender students use alternative restroom facilities.
- On 25 July, the Legislative Assembly of British Columbia unanimously passed a bill to amend the British Columbia Human Rights Code to prohibit discrimination based on gender identity and gender expression.
- Sarah McBride was a speaker at the Democratic National Convention, becoming the first openly transgender person to address a major party convention in American history.
- Elle printed special collectors' covers for their September 2016 issue, and one of them featured Hari Nef, which was the first time an openly transgender woman had been on the cover of a major commercial British magazine.

August

- Lea T became the first openly transgender person ever to participate in the opening ceremonies of an Olympics when she led the Brazilian team into the stadium on her bike during the 2016 Rio Olympics.

September

- Tracey Norman and Geena Rocero became the first two openly transgender models to appear on the cover of an edition of Harper's Bazaar.

October

- Harrison Browne of the National Women's Hockey League came out as a transgender man, which made him the first openly transgender athlete in professional American team sports.

=== 2017 ===
January

- The January 2017 issue of National Geographic has a nine-year-old transgender girl on the cover (Avery Jackson); she is thought to be the first openly transgender person on National Geographic's cover.
- Denmark became the second country in the world to officially remove transgender identities from its list of mental health disorders.
- Gabrielle Tremblay became the first openly transgender actress ever nominated for a Canadian Screen Award, as Best Supporting Actress for her role in Those Who Make Revolution Halfway Only Dig Their Own Graves (Ceux qui font les révolutions à moitié n'ont fait que se creuser un tombeau).

February

- Brazilian model Valentina Sampaio became the first openly transgender model on the cover of French Vogue.
- Joe Maldonado became the first openly transgender member of the Boy Scouts of America. In 2016, he was rejected from the Cub Scouts for being transgender, but this policy was changed in 2017 after his story became nationally known.
- Martina Robledo became the first openly transgender woman to act as a trophy presenter at the Grammys.

March

- Japan became the first country in the world to elect an openly transgender man to a public office when Tomoya Hosoda was elected as a councilor for the city of Iruma.

June

- M Barclay became the first openly non-binary trans person to be commissioned as a Deacon in the United Methodist Church.
- The Unitarian Universalist Association's General Assembly voted to create inclusive wordings for non-binary, genderqueer, gender fluid, agender, intersex, two-spirit and polygender people, replacing the words "men and women" with the word "people". Of the six sources of the living tradition, the second source of faith, as documented in the bylaws of the denomination, now includes "Words and deeds of prophetic people which challenge us to confront powers and structures of evil with justice, compassion, and the transforming power of love."

July

- Philippa York, formerly Robert Millar, came out as transgender, thus becoming the first former professional cyclist to have publicly transitioned.
- Alex Hai came out as a transgender man, thus becoming the first openly transgender gondolier in Venice.

October

- Ines Rau became the first openly transgender Playboy Playmate.

November

- Danica Roem was elected as Virginia's first transgender lawmaker.
- Andrea Jenkins became the first openly transgender black woman elected to public office in the United States when she was elected to the Minneapolis City Council.
- Tyler Titus, a transgender man, became the first openly transgender person elected to public office in Pennsylvania when he was elected to the Erie School Board. He and Phillipe Cunningham, elected to the Minneapolis City Council on the same night, became the first two openly trans men to be elected to public office in the United States.
- The United States Defense Health Agency for the first time approved payment for sex reassignment surgery for an active-duty U.S. military service member. The patient, a trans woman infantry soldier, had already begun a course of treatment, and the procedure, which the treating doctor deemed medically necessary, was performed on 14 November at a private hospital, since U.S. military hospitals lacked the requisite surgical expertise.

December

- America's first all-LGBT city council was elected in Palm Springs, California, consisting of three gay men, a transgender woman and a bisexual woman.

=== 2018 ===
January

- Canadian Women's Hockey League player Jessica Platt came out as a transgender woman, making her the first transgender woman to come out in North American professional hockey.
- Yance Ford and Joslyn Barnes were nominated for the Academy Award for Best Documentary Feature for producing Strong Island, which he also directed. As such, Ford was the first openly transgender man to be nominated for any Academy Award, and the first openly transgender director to be nominated for any Academy Award.
- Paris Lees became the first openly transgender woman featured in British Vogue.

February

- Laverne Cox became the first openly transgender person to appear on the cover of any Cosmopolitan magazine (specifically, Cosmopolitan South Africa's February 2018 issue).
- Transgender Health reported that a transgender woman in the United States breastfed her adopted baby; this was the first known case of a transgender woman breastfeeding.
- Daniela Vega became the first openly transgender person in history to be a presenter at the Academy Awards.

March

- Marvia Malik became the first openly transgender newsreader to appear on Pakistani television in 2018.

June

- Peppermint made her Broadway debut in The Go-Go's-inspired musical Head Over Heels. The show began previews on 23 June 2018 and officially opened 26 July; playing the role of Pythio, Peppermint became the first trans woman to originate a principal role on Broadway.
- Angela Ponce made history on 29 June 2018 as the first openly transgender woman to be crowned Miss Spain, and became the first openly transgender contestant in Miss Universe.
- Jesse James Keitel played TV Land's first non-binary character on Younger.

August

- Christine Hallquist became the first openly transgender candidate for governor nominated by a major political party in the United States when she was nominated for governor of Vermont by the Democrats.

September

- Stav Strashko became the first openly transgender actress ever to receive an Ophir Award nomination for Best Actress.
- Yance Ford and Joslyn Barnes were awarded an Emmy for Exceptional Merit in Documentary Filmmaking for producing Strong Island, which made Ford the first openly transgender man and the first black openly transgender person to win an Emmy award, as well as the first openly transgender filmmaker to win a Creative Arts Emmy.

November

- Paris Lees became a correspondent with British Vogue.

December

- Patricio Manuel became the first openly transgender male to box professionally in the United States, and, as he won the fight, the first openly transgender male to win a pro boxing fight in the U.S.
- Colombia prosecuted a transgender woman's murder as a femicide for the first time in 2018, sentencing Davinson Stiven Erazo Sánchez to twenty years in a psychiatric center for "aggravated femicide" a year after he killed Anyela Ramos Claros, a transgender woman.

=== 2019 ===
Feb

- Nyla Rose became the first openly transgender woman to sign with a major American professional wrestling promotion when she signed with All Elite Wrestling (AEW).
- Army Capt. Alivia Stehlik, Navy Lt. Cmdr. Blake Dremann, Army Capt. Jennifer Peace, Army Staff Sgt. Patricia King and Navy Petty Officer 3rd Class Akira Wyatt became the first openly transgender members of the United States military to testify publicly in front of Congress.

April

- The Trump administration announced on 12 April that transgender people were no longer allowed to enlist in the United States military if they had ever medically transitioned or had a history of gender dysphoria. Currently serving individuals were required to serve under their gender assigned at birth. This legal action is colloquially known as the "Trans Military Ban".

May

- Meghan Stabler became the first openly transgender member of Planned Parenthood's National Board of Directors. The Advocate editors named Meghan as one of The Advocate magazine's 2019 Champions of Pride.
- Indya Moore became the first openly transgender person to be featured on the cover of the U.S. version of Elle magazine.
- Lucia Lucas, normally based in Germany, made her debut as Don Giovanni with the Tulsa Opera, becoming the first openly transgender person to sing a lead role in a standard operatic work in the US.
- Gianmarco Negri was elected mayor of Tromello, making him Italy's first openly transgender mayor.

June

- Janet Mock signed a three-year deal with Netflix giving them exclusive rights to her TV series and a first-look option on feature film projects; this made her the first openly transgender woman of color to secure a deal with a major content company.
- Zach Barack became the first openly transgender actor in the Marvel Cinematic Universe when he played a classmate of Peter Parker's in Spider-Man: Far From Home.

July

- Laverne Cox was one of fifteen women chosen by guest editor Meghan, Duchess of Sussex to appear on the cover of the September 2019 issue of British Vogue; this made Cox the first openly transgender woman to appear on the cover of British Vogue.

August

- Valentina Sampaio was hired by Victoria's Secret as their first openly transgender model in August 2019.
- MJ Rodriguez became the first openly transgender woman to win Best Actress - Television at the Imagen Awards.
- June Eastwood became the first openly male-to-female transgender athlete to compete in NCAA Division I cross country; she competed for the University of Montana women's team.
- Teddy Quinlivan became the first openly transgender model to be hired by Chanel.

September

- Angelica Ross became the first openly transgender person to host an American presidential forum.
- Mattel launched the world's first line of gender-neutral dolls, which they marketed as Creatable World.

November

- In November 2019, transgender community leader Lauren Pulido raised the transgender pride flag over the California state capitol for Trans Day of Remembrance, reportedly the first time the transgender flag was raised over a state capitol building in the United States.

December

- In 27 December, Chile's Gender Identity Law came into force, allowing people to change their legal name and gender without the need of sex reassignment surgery.

== 2020s ==
=== 2020 ===
February

- Camila Prins became the first openly transgender woman to lead the drum section of a top samba school in the Carnival parade in São Paulo.
- The Pfister Hotel named Nykoli Koslow as its first openly transgender Artist in Residence.

March

- Megan Youngren became the first openly transgender athlete to compete at the Olympic marathon trials in U.S. history.
- The Philadelphia Police Academy graduated its first openly transgender officer, Benson Churgai.
- Diana Zurco became Argentina's first openly transgender newscaster.
- Chris Mosier became the first openly transgender male athlete to ever compete in an Olympic trial alongside other men; however, he was unable to finish the race due to injury.

June

- The Trump administration passed a regulation removing protections for transgender patients under medical care.
- The US Supreme Court ruled (in Bostock v. Clayton County) in favor of protecting employees from workplace discrimination based on sexual orientation or gender identity.

July

- The US Department of Housing and Urban Development announced plans to revert an ObamaCare-era ruling that prevented federally funded homeless shelters from discriminating against transgender people.
- Peyton Rose Michelle Theriot won election in Louisiana to the women's Democratic State Central Committee seat for the 46th District (seat A), representing St. Martin, Iberia and St. Landry, becoming the first out transgender woman elected to a political position in the state.
- Valentina Sampaio became the Sports Illustrated Swimsuit Issue's first openly transgender model in 2020.

August

September

October

- On 1 October 2020, Petra De Sutter was sworn in as one of seven deputy prime ministers in the government of Prime Minister Alexander De Croo, becoming Europe's first transgender deputy prime minister, and the most senior trans politician in Europe.
- FaZe Clan's Soleil 'Ewok' Wheeler came out as transgender, making him the first transgender male on a T1 esports organization.

November

- On 3 November 2020, Sarah McBride became the first transgender state senator elected in America.
- On 3 November 2020, Taylor Small became the first transgender person elected to be a state legislator in Vermont.
- On 7 November 2020, Joe Biden became the first president-elect to mention the transgender community in a victory speech.
- Big Sky premiered on 17 November 2020, making Jesse James Keitel the first nonbinary actor to play a nonbinary series regular on primetime television.
- In November 2020, Mauree Turner became the first non-binary state legislator elected in the United States.
- In November 2020, Stephanie Byers became the first Native American transgender person elected to office in America, when she was elected to the Kansas state House of Representatives; she is a member of the Chickasaw Nation. This election also made her the first transgender person elected to the Kansas state legislature.

December

- Mara Gómez became the first trans footballer to play in a top-flight Argentinian league.

=== 2021 ===
January

- Gottmik became the first openly transgender male contestant on RuPaul's Drag Race.
- After varying restrictions over the years, there stopped being restrictions on people serving in the US military due to their being transgender when President Joe Biden signed the "Executive Order on Enabling All Qualified Americans to Serve Their Country in Uniform" on 25 January 2021.

February

- In Angola a new criminal code went into effect after the parliament passed it in January 2019 and the president signed it into law in November 2020. The new code contains full anti-discrimination protections on the basis of gender identity.

March

- Elliot Page became the first openly trans man to appear on the cover of Time magazine.
- Tashnuva Anan Shishir became Bangladesh's first openly transgender news anchor.
- Patti Harrison became the first known transgender actor to appear in a Disney animated film, due to voicing the small part of Tail Chief in Raya and the Last Dragon.
- Rachel Levine was confirmed 24 March as U.S. assistant secretary for health, making her the first openly trans person confirmed by the U.S. Senate for a U.S. federal government position.
- Martine Delaney became the first openly transgender woman inducted into the Tasmanian Honour Roll of Women.
- Joe Biden became the first American president to issue a formal presidential proclamation recognizing the Transgender Day of Visibility.

April

- Alana Gisele Banks became the first Black openly transgender woman elected to a public school board in the United States.

September

- Megan Rohrer was instated as a Bishop in the Evangelical Lutheran Church of America, becoming the first openly transgender and non-binary bishop in any Christian denomination.

October

- The character of Bia was introduced as the first openly transgender Amazon in DC Comics' Wonder Woman series.

=== 2022 ===
February

- On 15 February 2022, Jowelle de Souza became the first transgender parliamentarian (specifically a Trinidad and Tobago senator) in the Caribbean.

March

- Jamie Wallis came out as transgender, becoming the first openly transgender MP in the House of Commons of the United Kingdom.
- Swimmer Lia Thomas became the first openly transgender athlete to win an NCAA Division I national championship in any sport, after winning the women's 500-yard freestyle with a time of 4:33.24.

May

- L. Morgan Lee became the first openly transgender person nominated for a Tony Award in an acting category; she was nominated for Best Performance by a Featured Actress in a Musical for playing Thought 1 in A Strange Loop.
- The Committee on Jewish Law and Standards approved a ruling authorizing non-gendered language for the aliyah, and the honors of the hagbah (lifting the Torah) and the gelilah (rolling up the Torah). The ruling also includes non-gendered language for calling up Cohens and Levis (descendants of the tribe of Levi) as well as how to address people without gendered language during the prayer Mi Shebeirach. This was a codification of a practice that already existed in places Jewish transgender people led.

June

- FINA (now World Aquatics) announced a new policy that effectively bars all transgender women from competing in professional women's swimming, with the exception of athletes who "can establish to FINA's comfortable satisfaction that they have not experienced any part of male puberty beyond Tanner Stage 2 (of puberty) or before age 12, whichever is later". FINA also announced the development of a separate "open" category for some events, to be determined by a working group over the next six months, so that "everybody has the opportunity to compete at an elite level".

August

- Ellia Green became the first Olympian to come out as a trans man.
- Jamie Hunter became the first openly transgender snooker player to win a women's tour ranking event in snooker when she won the U.S. Women's Open.

September

- In September 2022, Molly Kearney was announced as the first out non-binary cast member of Saturday Night Live.

October

- Duda Salabert and Erika Hilton became the first two openly transgender people elected to the National Congress of Brazil, with both of them elected to its Chamber of Deputies.

November

- Zooey Zephyr became the first openly transgender person to be elected to the state legislature in Montana.

=== 2023 ===
January

- Kim Petras (and Sam Smith) won the 2023 Grammy Award for Best Pop Duo/Group Performance for "Unholy", making Petras the first openly transgender artist to win a major-category Grammy Award.

May

- Sylvia Swayne announced her candidacy for the Alabama House of Representatives, becoming the first openly transgender woman to run for public office in Alabama.

June

- Seth Marnin became the first openly transgender judge in New York, and the first openly transgender male judge in the United States.

July

- Rikkie Kollé won the Miss Nederland 2023 beauty pageant, becoming the first openly transgender person to win a national beauty pageant.

November

- Danica Roem was elected to the Virginia Senate, becoming the first openly transgender person to be elected to a state senate in the Southern United States.

=== 2024 ===
January

- Danica Roem became the first openly transgender person to be elected and serve in both chambers of a state legislature (specifically, Virginia's) in U.S. history.

May

- At the 2024 Cannes Film Festival, Karla Sofía Gascón won the Best Actress prize, shared jointly with her costars Selena Gomez, Adriana Paz and Zoe Saldaña, making Gascón the first openly trans actor to win a major prize at Cannes.

== See also ==
- Intersex people in history
- LGBT history
- List of LGBT firsts by year
- Timeline of asexual history
- Timeline of LGBT history
- Timeline of LGBT history, 19th century
- Timeline of LGBT history, 20th century
- Timeline of LGBT history, 21st century
