= Eldorado: Everything the Nazis Hate =

- Directed by: Benjamin Cantu
- Written by: Benjamin Cantu; Felix Kriegsheim
- Narrated by: Robert Beachy; Katrin Himmler; Ben Miller; Klaus Mueller; Zavier Nunn; Morgan M. Page
- Cinematography: Christian Huck reenactments; Felix Leiberg documentary; Michael Marius Pessah Los Angeles unit; Cezary Zacharewicz reenactments
- Edited by: Barbara Gies
- Music by: Uno Helmersson
- Production companies: Film Base Berlin; Netflix Studios; The Thursday Company
- Distributed by: Netflix
- Release date: June 28, 2023 (Worldwide)
- Running time: 92 minutes
- Country: Germany
- Languages: English; German

Eldorado: Everything the Nazis Hate is a 2023 documentary film directed by Benjamin Cantu. The film was nominated for the 2024 GLAAD Media Award for Outstanding Documentary.

== Synopsis ==
The film is about the lives of LGBT people in the Weimar Republic and during the reign of Nazi Germany. The documentary film explores the titular Eldorado, a queer night club in Berlin. The film discusses queer figures in Germany during the 1920s and 1930s, such as Ernst Röhm, Magnus Hirschfeld, Gottfried von Cramm, Manasse Herbst, Charlotte Charlaque, and Toni Ebel. The film includes interviews with Walter Arlen, who grew up as a young gay Jew in Interwar Austria, and discusses the use of Paragraph 175 in Weimar Germany, in Nazi Germany and, in narrative closing credits, in post-War West Germany.

== Critical reception ==
Edge Media Network wrote "For anyone who wants the kind of understanding and perspective that the past offers us, Eldorado – Everything the Nazis Hate is an accessible, potent slice of history we'd do better to avoid repeating".
