= Sandi Hammond =

American singer-songwriter

Sandi Hammond is a Boston-based musician and business woman who founded Butterfly Music Transgender Chorus, the second all-transgender chorus in the country, in 2014. The first, the Transcendence Gospel Choir, was established in San Francisco in the early 2000s.

== Early life ==
Hammond grew up in Wellesley, and spend a lot of time with family in Plymouth, where she worked at the former Mayflower Seafoods on the waterfront. From an early age, Hammond's mother encouraged her to enter the world of music. Sandi Hammond was also part of a Boston-based children's choir when she was younger. Hammond went on to study music composition, singing, and piano at Earlham College in the Midwest. She also became steeped in the school’s underlying mission for social justice, but did not foresee a future career combining her two passions.

== Music career ==
After graduating, Hammond undertook a corporate sales job, before deciding to begin a career in music. Her debut album Rubbergirl, was released in 2003, and her second album, This Summer Night, followed in 2005, receiving critical acclaim from publications such as the Boston Herald. Hammond has made appearances on WERS and WGBH radio and has toured small acoustic venues on the East Coast. As a member of the jazz vocal trio, ESP, Hammond has also appeared at notable jazz club, Regattabar and on WGBH's prestigious jazz show, Eric in the Evening.

Hammond began teaching music, mindfulness, and meditation, and spent time keeping up to date with the Transgender Alliance Facebook Page. She was shocked by information she found on the page; for example, that transgender people are four times more likely to live in extreme poverty. In order to help, Hammond decided to create a choir specifically for the trans community.

== Butterfly Music Transgender Chorus ==
When she formed the Butterfly Music Transgender Chorus, Hammond was a major donor. Later, the Arts & Business Council of Greater Boston began serving as fiscal sponsor. The group quickly grew to 35 members, who rehearsed at a church in Cambridge. The chorus also received a high level of media interest, much of which focused on Hammond, including articles and interviews in O, The Oprah Magazine, WBUR, AP News, and ABC News. The chorus included trans women, trans men, and others who identified as nonbinary, agender, 3rd gender, intersex, trans masculine and trans feminine. The group was important for transgender singers, because most of its music was written for singers who do not fit into specific range categories, such as soprano or baritone. Since Butterfly's formation, between four and seven transgender choruses have formed around the US. At least one of them, the Transfinity KC Chorus in Kansas City, claims to have been directly inspired by the launch of Butterfly.

The Butterfly Music Transgender Chorus does not exist anymore. After two sold-out debut concerts in downtown Boston, Hammond stepped down in October 2016. This was the result of an intense debate about the impact of media exposure on the group and he fact that she herself is not trans. A small group of volunteers continued a self-led, volunteer song-circle for several months under the new name, Boston Trans Chorus.

== Research ==
During the course of her work as a vocal coach for transgender singers, Hammond made two important discoveries that she outlined in the 13th chapter of the book, Voice and Communication Therapy for the Transgender/Transsexual Client, edited by Richard Kenneth Adler, Sandy Hirsch, and Jack Pickering. Based on vocal range evaluations from over 50 trans men, who chose to take testosterone, Hammond discovered that the majority of their voices only deepened to A2, which is considered a baritone range, between tenor and bass. All but one trans man in the Butterfly Music Transgender Chorus gained enough notes to be considered a true bass (with a range that extended an additional 4th). Therefore, most trans men who elect to go on testosterone only gain about a 5th in range (usually from E3 to A2). Trans men also reported having to "re-learn" pitch-matching and sight-singing. This observation has implications for neurolinguistics and other research about how the brain learns to match pitch. One trans man explained, "before, as a soprano, I could sightread anything. Now, I have to re-learn how to think a note and then execute." Many trans men in the choir used the Tunable app during rehearsals, which was originally designed for guitar tuning, to create an immediate feedback loop as they re-learned to match pitch.
