= 2019 BWF World Senior Championships – 70+ =

Tournament details
- Dates: 4 August 2019 – 11 August 2019
- Edition: 9
- Level: International
- Competitors: 98 from 24 nations
- Venue: Spodek
- Location: Katowice, Poland

Champions
- Men's singles: (South Africa) Johan Croukamp
- Women's singles: (Japan) Yuriko Kaneko
- Men's doubles: (South Africa) Johan Croukamp (Finland) Carl-Johan Nybergh
- Women's doubles: (Japan) Haruko Asakoshi (Japan) Yasuko Kataito
- Mixed doubles: (Germany) Hans-Joachim Pothmann (Germany) Monika Regineri

These are the results of 2019 BWF World Senior Championships' 70+ events.

== Men's singles ==
=== Seeds ===
1. (South Africa) Johan Croukamp (gold medalist)
2. (Denmark) Per Dabelsteen (silver medalist)
3. (England) Jim Garrett (bronze medalist)
4. (Finland) Carl-Johan Nybergh (quarterfinals)
5. (India) Hubert Miranda (bronze medalist)
6. (Australia) Anthony Lourdes (quarterfinals)
7. (Thailand) Apirat Siwapornpitak (third round)
8. (Denmark) Harry Skydsgaard (second round)

=== Finals ===
Semifinals
1	(South Africa) Johan Croukamp	21	21
5	(India) Hubert Miranda	11	11
3	(England) Jim Garrett	15	12
2	(Denmark) Per Dabelsteen	21	21

Final
1	(South Africa) Johan Croukamp	21	21
2	(Denmark) Per Dabelsteen	11	6

=== Top half ===
==== Section 1 ====
First round
(Czech Republic) J Mácha	17	15
(Poland) W Księżyk	21	21

Second round
1	(South Africa) J Croukamp	21	21
(England) G Horrocks	2	12
(Germany) D Eichhorn	21	21
(Austria) J Halasz	19	9
8	(Denmark) H Skydsgaard	14	11
(Japan) H Toshijima	21	21
(Sweden) L-O Olsson	6	21	13
(Poland) W Księżyk	21	14	21

Third round
1	(South Africa) J Croukamp	21	21
(Germany) D Eichhorn	12	6
(Japan) H Toshijima	21	21
(Poland) W Księżyk	12	10

Quarterfinals
1	(South Africa) J Croukamp	21	22
(Japan) H Toshijima	8	20

==== Section 2 ====
First round
(England) M J Cox	21	18	21
(Poland) P Grzeszkowiak	15	21	14

Second round
4	(Finland) C-J Nybergh	21	21
(Thailand) J Leraman	12	3
(Denmark) K Danielsen	21	21
(Germany) P Honnen	11	15
5	(India) H Miranda	21	21
(Russia) V Duritsyn	16	6
(Canada) A A Knott	21	21
(England) M J Cox	16	13

Third round
4	(Finland) C-J Nybergh	21	21	21
(Denmark) K Danielsen	23	18	9
5	(India) H Miranda	21	19	21
(Canada) A A Knott	8	21	10

Quarterfinals
4	(Finland) C-J Nybergh	18	23	13
5	(India) H Miranda	21	21	21

=== Bottom half ===
==== Section 3 ====
First round
(Switzerland) W Rahm	21	17	21
(Israel) E Ofir	15	21	16
(Sweden) P-A Höij	24	16	12
(India) J George Jamakiraman	22	21	21

Second round
(Switzerland) W Rahm	21	21
(Poland) A Antosiewicz	4	12
(Germany) H-J Pothmann	18	21	19
6	(Australia) A Lourdes	21	11	21
(India) J George Jamakiraman	21	21
(Austria) H Mähring	14	19
(Denmark) T Hansen	14	15
3	(England) J Garrett	21	21

Third round
(Switzerland) W Rahm	14	9
6	(Australia) A Lourdes	21	21
(India) J George Jamakiraman	12	8
3	(England) J Garrett	21	21

Quarterfinals
6	(Australia) A Lourdes	21	12
3	(England) J Garrett	23	21

==== Section 4 ====
First round
(Scotland) W Durie	2
(Poland) W Świątczak	1^{r}

Second round
(Scotland) W Durie	13	11
(Finland) T Tennilä	21	21
(Moldova) N Botnarenco	19	14
7	(Thailand) A Siwapornpitak	21	21
(Malaysia) I S Abdullah	21	21
(Sweden) W Schneider	14	13
(Germany) B U Brüsewitz	12	10
2	(Denmark) P Dabelsteen	21	21

Third round
(Finland) T Tennilä	21	21
7	(Thailand) A Siwapornpitak	6	6
(Malaysia) I S Abdullah	14	22	13
2	(Denmark) P Dabelsteen	21	20	21

Quarterfinals
(Finland) T Tennilä	9	10
2	(Denmark) P Dabelsteen	21	21

== Women's singles ==
=== Seeds ===
1. (Germany) Elvira Richter (bronze medalist)
2. (Japan) Sumiko Kaneko (bronze medalist)
3. (Japan) Yuriko Okemoto (gold medalist)
4. (Denmark) Irene Sterlie (quarterfinals)

=== Finals ===
Semifinals
1	(Germany) Elvira Richter	7	14
3	(Japan) Yuriko Okemoto	21	21
(Japan) Yasuko Kataito	21	21
2	(Japan) Sumiko Kaneko	17	13

Final
3	(Japan) Yuriko Okemoto	21	21
(Japan) Yasuko Kataito	14	8

=== Top half ===
==== Section 1 ====
First round	Second round					Quarterfinals
	1	(Germany) E Richter	w	/	o
		(India) M Saxena
						1	(Germany) E Richter	21	14	21
							(Belgium) N Halsberghe	16	21	7
	(Belgium) N Halsberghe		21	21
	(Finland) L Junnila		14	15

==== Section 2 ====
First round	Second round					Quarterfinals
	3	(Japan) Y Okemoto	21	21
		(Denmark) J Nielsen	16	19
						3	(Japan) Y Okemoto	21	21
							(Sweden) L Wengberg	16	12
	(Sweden) L Wengberg		w	/	o
	(India) M Anand

=== Bottom half ===
==== Section 3 ====
First round
(France) F Bocquet	18	15
(India) O Dcosta	21	21

Second round
(India) O Dcosta	5	5
(Japan) Y Kataito	21	21
(Germany) A Schneider	7	12
4	(Denmark) I Sterlie	21	21

Quarterfinals
(Japan) Y Kataito	21	24
4	(Denmark) I Sterlie	17	22

==== Section 4 ====
First round	Second round					Quarterfinals
	(Denmark) T Gyldenoehr		21	21
	(Germany) M Nilges		16	11
							(Denmark) T Gyldenoehr	14	15
						2	(Japan) S Kaneko	21	21
		(Sweden) K Ekengren Gärtner	21	6	20
	2	(Japan) S Kaneko	14	21	22

== Men's doubles ==
=== Seeds ===
1. (Denmark) Knud Danielsen / Torben Hansen (silver medalists)
2. (South Africa) Johan Croukamp / (Finland) Carl-Johan Nybergh (gold medalists)
3. (England) Michael John Cox / Jim Garrett (bronze medalists)
4. (England) Gavin Horrocks / Grahame L. Moscrop (quarterfinals)

=== Finals ===
Semifinals
1	(Denmark) Knud Danielsen (Denmark) Torben Hansen	21	21
3	(England) Michael John Cox (England) Jim Garrett	12	19
(Germany) Peter Honnen (Germany) Claus-Peter Lienig	15	11
2	(South Africa) Johan Croukamp (Finland) Carl-Johan Nybergh	21	21

Final
1	(Denmark) Knud Danielsen (Denmark) Torben Hansen	21	13	12
2	(South Africa) Johan Croukamp (Finland) Carl-Johan Nybergh	15	21	21

=== Top half ===
==== Section 1 ====
First round
(Germany) L Bollin (Germany) B U Brüsewitz	21	21
(Canada) A A Knott (Slovakia) J Kozák	12	13
(Thailand) S Chintanaseri (Thailand) P Khaosamang	21	21
(Austria) J Halasz (Austria) H Mähring	8	7

Second round
1	(Denmark) K Danielsen (Denmark) T Hansen	21	21
(Germany) L Bollin (Germany) B U Brüsewitz	12	8
(Czech Republic) J Mácha (Israel) E Ofir	4	4
(Thailand) S Chintanaseri (Thailand) P Khaosamang	21	21

Quarterfinals
1	(Denmark) K Danielsen (Denmark) T Hansen	21	21
(Thailand) S Chintanaseri (Thailand) P Khaosamang	16	19

==== Section 2 ====
First round
(India) J P Ramappa (India) B K Shikari	21	21
(Germany) W Thie (Germany) H Wiegand	13	19
(Japan) Y Sugitani (Japan) H Toshijima	21	21
(Sweden) P-A Höij (Sweden) W Schneider	15	12

Second round
3	(England) M J Cox (England) J Garrett	21	21
(India) J P Ramappa (India) B K Shikari	9	6
(Malaysia) I S Abdullah (Australia) A Lourdes	15	13
(Japan) Y Sugitani (Japan) H Toshijima	21	21

Quarterfinals
3	(England) M J Cox (England) J Garrett	21	21
(Japan) Y Sugitani (Japan) H Toshijima	6	16

=== Bottom half ===
==== Section 3 ====
First round
(Germany) P Honnen (Germany) C-P Lienig	21	21
(Poland) W Borzęcki (Poland) P Grzeszkowiak	15	7
(Denmark) S Fuursted (Denmark) H Skydsgaard	17	21	21
(Malaysia) Goh K C (Malaysia) V Menon	21	12	14
(India) J George Janakiraman (India) D Surti	21	21
(Russia) V Duritsyn (Netherlands) K Tokromo	17	11

Second round
(Germany) P Honnen (Germany) C-P Lienig	10	21	21
(Denmark) S Fuursted (Denmark) H Skydsgaard	21	10	19
(India) J George Janakiraman (India) D Surti	21	17	16
4	(England) G Horrocks (England) G L. Moscrop	18	21	21

Quarterfinals
(Germany) P Honnen (Germany) C-P Lienig	15	21	24
4	(England) G Horrocks (England) G L. Moscrop	21	10	22

==== Section 4 ====
First round
(England) I Brothers (England) M Stoneman	13	12
(Poland) W Księżyk (England) K Tantum	21	21
(Germany) D Behrend (Germany) G Jacobi	21	22
(Scotland) W Durie (Switzerland) W Rahm	14	20

Second round
(Poland) W Księżyk (England) K Tantum	21	17	21
(Thailand) A Siwapornpitak (Thailand) P Surakkhaka	18	21	19
(Germany) D Behrend (Germany) G Jacobi	12	12
2	(South Africa) J Croukamp (Finland) C-J Nybergh	21	21

Quarterfinals
(Poland) W Księżyk (England) K Tantum	10	10
2	(South Africa) J Croukamp (Finland) C-J Nybergh	21	21

== Women's doubles ==
=== Seeds ===
1. (Japan) Haruko Asakoshi / Yasuko Kataito (gold medalists)
2. (Germany) Renate Gabriel / Elvira Richter (quarterfinals)

=== Group A ===
Pos	Team	Pld	W	L	GF	GA	GD	PF	PA	PD	Qualification
1	(Japan) Haruko Asakoshi (Japan) Yasuko Kataito	2	2	0	4	0	+4	84	52	+32	Qualified to Quarterfinals
2	(Denmark) Jette Nielsen (Denmark) Irene Sterlie	2	1	1	2	2	0	69	72	−3	Qualified to Quarterfinals
3	(England) Joanna Elson (England) Valerie Ann O'Neill	2	0	2	0	4	−4	55	84	−29	

Source: TS

Date		Score		Set 1	Set 2	Set 3
Aug 4; 11:00	Haruko Asakoshi (Japan); Yasuko Kataito (Japan)	2–0	(Denmark) Jette Nielsen (Denmark) Irene Sterlie	21–12	21–15	
Aug 5; 12:30	Joanna Elson (England); Valerie Ann O'Neill (England)	0–2	(Denmark) Jette Nielsen (Denmark) Irene Sterlie	16–21	14–21	
Aug 7; 13:15	Haruko Asakoshi (Japan); Yasuko Kataito (Japan)	2–0	(England) Joanna Elson (England) Valerie Ann O'Neill	21–17	21–8	

=== Group B ===
Pos	Team	Pld	W	L	GF	GA	GD	PF	PA	PD	Qualification
1	(Germany) Renate Knötzsch (Germany) Monika Regineri	2	2	0	4	1	+3	105	61	+44	Qualified to Quarterfinals
2	(England) Wendy Arscott (England) Vera Groves	2	1	1	3	2	+1	96	82	+14	Qualified to Quarterfinals
3	(Switzerland) Margrit Gretler (Germany) Astrid Schneider	2	0	2	0	4	−4	26	84	−58	

Source: TS

Date		Score		Set 1	Set 2	Set 3
Aug 4; 11:00	Wendy Arscott (England); Vera Groves (England)	2–0	(Switzerland) Margrit Gretler (Germany) Astrid Schneider	21–10	21–9	
Aug 5; 13:00	Renate Knötzsch (Germany); Monika Regineri (Germany)	2–0	(Switzerland) Margrit Gretler (Germany) Astrid Schneider	21–2	21–5	
Aug 7; 13:15	Wendy Arscott (England); Vera Groves (England)	1–2	(Germany) Renate Knötzsch (Germany) Monika Regineri	23–21	16–21	15–21

=== Group C ===
Pos	Team	Pld	W	L	GF	GA	GD	PF	PA	PD	Qualification
1	(Japan) Sumiko Kaneko (Japan) Yuriko Okemoto	3	3	0	6	1	+5	145	97	+48	Qualified to Quarterfinals
2	(Sweden) Ewa Carlander (Sweden) Kathryn Ekengren Gärtner	3	2	1	4	2	+2	109	80	+29	Qualified to Quarterfinals
3	(England) Vicki Betts (England) Linda Coombes	3	1	2	3	4	−1	119	120	−1	
4	(Finland) Sylvi Jormanainen (Finland) Leila Junnila	3	0	3	0	6	−6	50	126	−76	

Source: TS

Date		Score		Set 1	Set 2	Set 3
Aug 4; 11:00	Sumiko Kaneko (Japan); Yuriko Okemoto (Japan)	2–0	(Finland) Sylvi Jormanainen (Finland) Leila Junnila	21–10	21–13	
Aug 4; 11:30	Vicki Betts (England); Linda Coombes (England)	0–2	(Sweden) Ewa Carlander (Sweden) Kathryn Ekengren Gärtner	18–21	10–21	
Aug 5; 10:00	Vicki Betts (England); Linda Coombes (England)	2–0	(Finland) Sylvi Jormanainen (Finland) Leila Junnila	21–7	21–10	
Aug 5; 13:00	Sumiko Kaneko (Japan); Yuriko Okemoto (Japan)	2–0	(Sweden) Ewa Carlander (Sweden) Kathryn Ekengren Gärtner	21–14	21–11	
Aug 7; 13:15	Vicki Betts (England); Linda Coombes (England)	1–2	(Japan) Sumiko Kaneko (Japan) Yuriko Okemoto	15–21	21–19	13–21
Aug 7; 13:15	Sylvi Jormanainen (Finland); Leila Junnila (Finland)	0–2	(Sweden) Ewa Carlander (Sweden) Kathryn Ekengren Gärtner	6–21	4–21	

=== Group D ===
Pos	Team	Pld	W	L	GF	GA	GD	PF	PA	PD	Qualification
1	(Germany) Renate Gabriel (Germany) Elvira Richter	2	2	0	4	1	+3	107	85	+22	Qualified to Quarterfinals
2	(England) Sue Awcock (England) Jan Hewett	2	1	1	2	2	0	79	71	+8	Qualified to Quarterfinals
3	(Denmark) Margrethe Danielsen (Denmark) Thea Gyldenoehr	2	0	2	1	4	−3	77	107	−30	

Source: TS

Date		Score		Set 1	Set 2	Set 3
Aug 4; 16:30	Renate Gabriel (Germany); Elvira Richter (Germany)	2–1	(Denmark) Margrethe Danielsen (Denmark) Thea Gyldenoehr	23–25	21–13	21–10
Aug 5; 09:00	Sue Awcock (England); Jan Hewett (England)	2–0	(Denmark) Margrethe Danielsen (Denmark) Thea Gyldenoehr	21–13	21–16	
Aug 7; 13:15	Renate Gabriel (Germany); Elvira Richter (Germany)	2–0	(England) Sue Awcock (England) Jan Hewett	21–19	21–18	

=== Finals ===
Quarterfinals
1	(Japan) Haruko Asakoshi (Japan) Yasuko Kataito	22	19	21
(Sweden) Ewa Carlander (Sweden) Kathryn Ekengren Gärtner	20	21	15
(Germany) Renate Knötzsch (Germany) Monika Regineri	21	22
(England) Sue Awcock (England) Jan Hewett	19	20
(England) Wendy Arscott (England) Vera Groves	11	13
(Denmark) Jette Nielsen (Denmark) Irene Sterlie	21	21
(Japan) Sumiko Kaneko (Japan) Yuriko Okemoto	21	21
2	(Germany) Renate Gabriel (Germany) Elvira Richter	18	15

Semifinals
1	(Japan) Haruko Asakoshi (Japan) Yasuko Kataito	21	21
(Germany) Renate Knötzsch (Germany) Monika Regineri	14	11
(Denmark) Jette Nielsen (Denmark) Irene Sterlie	13	22	21
(Japan) Sumiko Kaneko (Japan) Yuriko Okemoto	21	20	15

Final
1	(Japan) Haruko Asakoshi (Japan) Yasuko Kataito	21	21
(Denmark) Jette Nielsen (Denmark) Irene Sterlie	18	14

== Mixed doubles ==
=== Seeds ===
1. (Denmark) Per Dabelsteen / Irene Sterlie (quarterfinals)
2. (Denmark) Knud Danielsen / Margrette Danielsen (quarterfinals)
3. (England) Jim Garrett / Angela Brown (second round)
4. (England) Roger Baldwin / Vicki Betts (second round)

=== Finals ===
Semifinals
(Japan) Hirohisa Toshijima (Japan) Yuriko Okemoto	21	11	22
(Denmark) Harry Skydsgaard (Denmark) Thea Gyldenoehr	16	21	20
(Germany) Hans-Joachim Pothmann (Germany) Monika Regineri	21	21
(England) Ian Brothers (England) Jan Hewett	19	9

Final
(Japan) Hirohisa Toshijima (Japan) Yuriko Okemoto	12	18
(Germany) Hans-Joachim Pothmann (Germany) Monika Regineri	21	21

=== Top half ===
==== Section 1 ====
First round
(Japan) H Toshijima (Japan) Y Okemoto	21	16	21
(Denmark) T Hansen (Sweden) L Wengberg	18	21	17

Second round
1	(Denmark) P Dabelsteen (Denmark) I Sterlie	21	21
(Germany) H Wiegand (Germany) E Richter	6	11
(England) K Tantum (England) J Elson	21	14	16
(Japan) H Toshijima (Japan) Y Okemoto	17	21	21

Quarterfinals
1	(Denmark) P Dabelsteen (Denmark) I Sterlie	20	21	16
(Japan) H Toshijima (Japan) Y Okemoto	22	14	21

==== Section 2 ====
First round
(India) H Miranda (India) M Anand
(Japan) Y Sugitani (Japan) H Asakoshi	w	/	o
SUB	(Germany) D Eichhorn (Germany) A Schneider	13	12
(Malaysia) Goh K C (Belgium) N Halsberghe	21	21

Second round
4	(England) R Baldwin (England) V Betts	21	12	19
(Japan) Y Sugitani (Japan) H Asakoshi	14	21	21
(Denmark) H Skydsgaard (Denmark) T Gyldenoehr	21	21
(Malaysia) Goh K C (Belgium) N Halsberghe	17	8

Quarterfinals
(Japan) Y Sugitani (Japan) H Asakoshi	22	11	13
(Denmark) H Skydsgaard (Denmark) T Gyldenoehr	20	21	21

=== Bottom half ===
==== Section 3 ====
First round
(India) M Mandayam Devasikhamani (India) O Dcosta	16	15
(Japan) S Matsuda (Japan) Y Kataito	21	21
(Germany) H-J Pothmann (Germany) M Regineri	21	21
(Canada) M P A Foubister (Finland) L Junnila	7	5

Second round
(Japan) S Matsuda (Japan) Y Kataito	21	21
(Russia) V Duritsyn (Switzerland) M Gretler	8	15
(Germany) H-J Pothmann (Germany) M Regineri	21	21
3	(England) J Garrett (England) A Brown	15	18

Quarterfinals
(Japan) S Matsuda (Japan) Y Kataito	16	9
(Germany) H-J Pothmann (Germany) M Regineri	21	21

==== Section 4 ====
First round
(England) I Brothers (England) J Hewett	21	21
(Netherlands) K Tokromo (Finland) W Renholm	18	19
(Switzerland) W Rahm (Switzerland) B Brunner	21	24
(Germany) G Jacobi (Germany) M Nilges	14	22

Second round
(England) I Brothers (England) J Hewett	21	21
(Finland) T Tennilä (Finland) S Jormanainen	14	14
(Switzerland) W Rahm (Switzerland) B Brunner	16	21	11
2	(Denmark) K Danielsen (Denmark) M Danielsen	21	14	21

Quarterfinals
(England) I Brothers (England) J Hewett	21	21
2	(Denmark) K Danielsen (Denmark) M Danielsen	13	15
