= Ludwig Levy-Lenz =

German doctor

Ludwig Levy-Lenz (born 1 December 1892 in Posen (now Poznań), German Reich; died 30 October 1966 in Munich) was a German doctor of medicine and a sexual reformer, known for performing some of the first sex reassignment surgeries for patients of the Hirschfeld institute.

== Life ==
Ludwig Levy took on the double name Ludwig Levy-Lenz early on, and after the Second World War and his return to Germany he published under the name Ludwig L. Lenz. He came from an upper middle-class Jewish family. In 1909 he went to Heidelberg with his younger brother Siegbert to study medicine and from there to Munich and Breslau. At the beginning of the First World War he was stationed as a soldier in Posen in a special hospital for reconstructive surgery and orthopedics that he set up himself. On behalf of his military superiors, he set up a war brothel and worked as a pimp.

After the war, with the financial support of his parents, he opened a medical practice in Berlin on Rosenthaler Platz, adjacent to the proletarian-Jewish quarter Scheunenviertel. From 1925 he was a member of the medical staff at Hirschfeld's institute, where he performed surgical operations such as castration and gender reassignment, the latter in collaboration with Erwin Gohrbandt; his patients included Dora Richter, Charlotte Charlaque, Toni Ebel and Lili Elbe.

Around 1926, after divorcing his first wife Denise, a dancer, he moved to the middle-class Westend of Berlin at Ahornallee 51. His second marriage to Elma Wilhelm lasted until 1932. In 1930 he compiled the first medical book on the subject of abortion. In 1933, when power was passed to the National Socialists, Levy-Lenz married Marya Goldwasser, who was twenty years younger than him and had to flee with her to Paris because of the German persecution of Jews. In the run-up to the Olympic Games, he believed that German anti-Semitic politics would relax and returned to Germany, only to emigrate to Egypt in 1937. There he was able to open a cosmetic surgery practice. In 1939 he was stripped of his German citizenship.

Levy-Lenz worked in the various interconnected medical fields of venereology, gynecology, surgery, cosmetic surgery and sexology. He wrote a number of popular writings, such as the 1919 brochure How do I protect myself from sexually transmitted diseases? (German: Wie schütze ich mich vor Geschlechtskrankheiten?), which was advertised and sold in public toilets, which earned him the ridicule (and envy) of the medical profession. Since the propagation of contraception was considered immoral and under threat of punishment, the educational courses on "sexual hygiene" offered by Levy-Lenz had to cover up their actual topic. There was a close connection between the association Die Ehe he founded, the sex counseling center he maintained and the magazine Die Ehe on the one hand, and the Institute for Sexology, headed by Magnus Hirschfeld, on the other. He was also able to win over authors such as Kurt Tucholsky and Thomas Mann and illustrators such as Otto Dix for the magazine. Levy-Lenz published educational pamphlets under popular scientific titles - with a scientific claim.

After he and Peter Schmidt had participated in the experiments with rejuvenation operations using the method propagated by Eugen Steinach, Levy-Lenz later left the field to Schmidt. After emigrating, he was forced to focus increasingly on cosmetic surgery. In post-war Germany he was able to reissue some revised writings and publish an autobiography.

Levy-Lenz's works were also translated into other languages: a translation was even printed in France during the German occupation in 1943. His 1950 biography, Diskretes und Indiskretes, was translated to English as The memoirs of a sexologist; Discretion and indiscretion in 1959. After the end of the war, Lenz worked seasonally alternately in Baden-Baden and Cairo and finally returned to Berlin in 1965.

Ludwig Levy-Lenz died on October 30, 1966 in a Munich hospital. He was buried in the New Jewish Cemetery (section 17, row 11, grave 16) in Munich, Garchinger Straße 37.

== Works ==
- Ludwig Levy: Kriegsgemäße Orthopädie der Extremitäten, DMW – Deutsche Medizinische Wochenschrift, V.41, Nr.15 S. 436–439.
- Wie schütze ich mich vor Geschlechtskrankheiten?, 1919.
- Peter Schmidt; Ludwig Levy-Lenz: Die Erfolge der Steinachbehandlung beim Menschen, Berlin: G. Ziemsen, 1921.
- Sexual-Katastrophen : Bilder aus dem modernen Geschlechts- und Eheleben. Leipzig 1926.
  - Darin: Die Geächteten. S. 259–332.
- Maria Winter; Ludwig Levy-Lenz: Abtreibung oder Verhütung der Schwangerschaft?, Berlin-Hessenwinkel: Verlag d. Neuen Gesellschaft, 1928.
- Die aufgeklärte Frau : ein Buch für alle Frauen, 1928.
- Janine : Tagebuch einer Verjüngten, Berlin: Man Verlag, 1928.
- Wenn Frauen nicht gebären dürfen : Bedeutg u. Methode d. Empfängnisverhütg gemeinverst. dargest., Berlin-Hessenwinkel: Verlag d. Neuen Gesellschaft 1928.
- Kurt Bendix; Johannes Werthauer; Sophie Lützenkirchen; Ludwig Levy-Lenz: Die Schwangerschaftsunterbrechung ihre Voraussetzung und ihre Technik. Bedeutung, rechtliche Grundlage, Indikationen und Technik des indizierten Abortes in den ersten drei Schwangerschaftsmonaten; ein kurzgefaßter Leitfaden für Ärzte und Studierende, Berlin-Hessenwinkel: Baumeister 1930.
- Hexenkessel der Liebe, Leipzig: Lykeion, Kulturwiss. Verlagsges., 1931.
  - Liebesleben der Wilden und Erotik der Naiven, Lieferung 1, Leipzig: Lykeion Verlag, 1931.
  - Liebesleben der Perversen, Lieferung 2, Leipzig: Lykeion Verlag, 1931.
  - Kranke Liebe und Liebeskrankheiten, Lieferung 3, Leipzig: Lykeion Verlag, 1931.
- mit Arthur Koestler, A. Willy: Encyclopédie de la vie sexuelle, Paris, Aldor 1934.
- La femme initiée, Le Caire, R. Schindler, 1943.
- Diskretes und Indiskretes; Memoiren eines Sexualarztes, Schmiden b. Stuttgart: Treya-Verl. 1950.
- Praxis der kosmetischen Chirurgie : Fortschritte u. Gefahren, 1954.
- The memoirs of a sexologist; Discretion and indiscretion, New York: Cadillac, 1959.
- Madeleine: Tagebuch einer Verjüngten, Konstanz: Exakt-Verlag, 1964.
