= 2019 BWF World Senior Championships – 65+ =

Tournament details
- Dates: 4 August 2019 – 11 August 2019
- Edition: 9
- Level: International
- Competitors: 128 from 25 nations
- Venue: Spodek
- Location: Katowice, Poland

Champions
- Men's singles: (Malaysia) Bruni Garip
- Women's singles: (Germany) Marie-Luise Schulta-Jansen
- Men's doubles: (Denmark) Jeppe Skov Jespen (Denmark) Per Mikkelsen
- Women's doubles: (England) Marguerite Butt (England) Brenda Creasey
- Mixed doubles: (England) Peter Emptage (England) Betty Bartlett

These are the results of 2019 BWF World Senior Championships' 65+ events.

== Men's singles ==
=== Seeds ===
1. (Canada) Henry Paynter (bronze medalist)
2. (Denmark) Søren Christensen (quarterfinals)
3. (Malaysia) Bruni Garip (gold medalist)
4. (England) Graham Michael Robinson (bronze medalist)
5. (Sweden) Stefan Ohras (second round)
6. (Denmark) Ole Krogh Mortensen (quarterfinals)
7. (Sweden) Curt Ingedahl (quarterfinals)
8. (Denmark) Per Mikkelsen (second round)

=== Finals ===
Semifinals
1	(Canada) Henry Paynter	12	9
3	(Malaysia) Bruni Garip	21	21
4	(England) Graham Michael Robinson	18	13
(Japan) Seiji Yamamoto	21	21

Final
3	(Malaysia) Bruni Garip	21	21
(Japan) Seiji Yamamoto	14	12

=== Top half ===
==== Section 1 ====
First round
(Sri Lanka) S J Peti Arambage	21	21
(Czech Republic) L Vorel	19	18
(India) A Kuriakose
(Japan) N Nakamura	w	/	o
(Poland) J Łański	6	12
(Denmark) C Hansen	21	21
(Germany) U Spähn	20	17
(England) J Gradner	22	21

Second round
1	(Canada) H Paynter	21	21
(Sri Lanka) S J Peti Arambage	9	11
(France) P Premat	18	21	18
(Japan) N Nakamura	21	19	21
7	(Sweden) C Ingedahl	21	17	21
(Denmark) C Hansen	17	21	18
(Chinese Taipei) Lu Y-t	14	12
(England) J Gradner	21	21

Third round
1	(Canada) H Paynter	21	15	21
(Japan) N Nakamura	8	21	17
7	(Sweden) C Ingedahl	19	21	21
(England) J Gradner	21	19	16

Quarterfinals
1	(Canada) H Paynter	13	21	21
7	(Sweden) C Ingedahl	21	13	15

==== Section 2 ====
First round
(India) S N Mohamed	21	21
(Germany) D Hechler	14	9
(Sweden) B Randström
(Russia) I Ponomarev	w	/	o
(England) S Sellick	w	/	o
(France) G Vioulès
(Japan) K Takahashi	21	21
(Estonia) A Raig	16	15

Second round
3	(Malaysia) B Garip	21	21
(India) S N Mohamed	7	5
(Norway) O K Frog	19	23	21
(Russia) I Ponomarev	21	21	19
6	(Denmark) O K Mortensen	21	21
(England) S Sellick	10	12
(Poland) J Rybicki	9	13
(Japan) K Takahashi	21	21

Third round
3	(Malaysia) B Garip	21	21
(Norway) O K Frog	10	8
6	(Denmark) O K Mortensen	21	21
(Japan) K Takahashi	12	17

Quarterfinals
3	(Malaysia) B Garip	21	21
6	(Denmark) O K Mortensen	19	15

=== Bottom half ===
==== Section 3 ====
First round
(Germany) E Peschel	w	/	o
(Russia) A Buzynin
(Sweden) B Stigson	21	21
(France) P Moucheboeuf	13	15
(Republic of Ireland) B McKee	w	/	o
(Netherlands) M Voskuilen
(Malaysia) Ong S O	21	23	21
(Finland) O Onninen	18	25	19

Second round
(Germany) E Peschel	21	11	21
(India) A K Sondhi	13	21	12
(Sweden) B Stigson	18	21	22
8	(Denmark) P Mikkelsen	21	12	20
(Republic of Ireland) B McKee	21	16	16
(Poland) A Struensee	18	21	21
(Malaysia) Ong S O	11	7
4	(England) G M Robinson	21	21

Third round
(Germany) E Peschel	21	21
(Sweden) B Stigson	12	18
(Poland) A Struensee	6	7
4	(England) G M Robinson	21	21

Quarterfinals
(Germany) E Peschel	18	13
4	(England) G M Robinson	21	21

==== Section 4 ====
First round
(England) L P Loo	21	21
(Poland) J Szafrański	12	12
(Japan) S Yamamoto	21	21
(Germany) K Rosenkranz	9	9
(Ukraine) O Ishchenko	20	21	21
(Thailand) N Kulsavete	22	13	14
(France) J-L Ghenassia	10	10
(Canada) W Metcalfe	21	21

Second round
(England) L P Loo	21	21
(Norway) H Hansen	10	10
(Japan) S Yamamoto	21	21
5	(Sweden) S Ohras	17	17
(Ukraine) O Ishchenko	21	19	21
(Malaysia) Lim Y S	16	21	18
(Canada) W Metcalfe	16	15
2	(Denmark) S Christensen	21	21

Third round
(England) L P Loo	10	21	17
(Japan) S Yamamoto	21	18	21
(Ukraine) O Ishchenko	13	16
2	(Denmark) S Christensen	21	21

Quarterfinals
(Japan) S Yamamoto	21	21
2	(Denmark) S Christensen	18	19

== Women's singles ==
=== Seeds ===
1. (England) Christine M. Crossley (silver medalist)
2. (England) Betty Bartlett (bronze medalist)
3. (Canada) Siew Har Hong (second round)
4. (Germany) Marie-Luise Schulta-Jansen (gold medalist)

=== Finals ===
Semifinals
1	(England) Christine M. Crossley	w	/	o
(England) Marguerite Butt
4	(Germany) Marie-Luise Schulta-Jansen	21	21
2	(England) Betty Bartlett	19	13

Final
1	(England) Christine M. Crossley	19	21	20
4	(Germany) Marie-Luise Schulta-Jansen	21	8	22

=== Top half ===
==== Section 1 ====
First round
(Germany) E Schmidt	21	21
(Russia) O Dolina	7	16

Second round
1	(England) C M. Crossley	21	21
(India) S D'Souza	6	7
(Sweden) G Johansson	9	12
(Germany) E Schmidt	21	21

Quarterfinals
1	(England) C M. Crossley	21	21
(Germany) E Schmidt	13	16

==== Section 2 ====
First round
(England) M Butt	21	21
(Spain) D Touriño	8	10
(Germany) H Graef	15	21	21
(India) P Nagalia	21	16	13

Second round
3	(Canada) S H Hong	21	22	19
(England) M Butt	15	24	21
(France) M Bontemps	21	21
(Germany) H Graef	18	14

Quarterfinals
(England) M Butt	21	14	21
(France) M Bontemps	14	21	18

=== Bottom half ===
==== Section 3 ====
First round
(England) A Harris	18	21	21
(Poland) K Cielecka	21	5	15
(Japan) M Namura	23	9	17
(United States) R Lei	21	21	21

Second round
(England) A Harris	21	11	12
(India) S V. John	17	21	21
(United States) R Lei	w	/	o
4	(Germany) M-L Schulta-Jansen

Quarterfinals
(India) S V. John	12	3
4	(Germany) M-L Schulta-Jansen	21	21

==== Section 4 ====
First round
(Germany) H Hauser	21	16	22
(India) S Chitre	15	21	24

Second round
(India) S Chitre	16	16
(Finland) U Roinela	21	21
(Sweden) C Kruseborn	10	3
2	(England) B Bartlett	21	21

Quarterfinals
(Finland) U Roinela	7	14
2	(England) B Bartlett	21	21

== Men's doubles ==
=== Seeds ===
1. (England) Peter Emptage / John Gardner (bronze medalists)
2. (India) Sushil Kumar Patet / Surendra Singh Pundir (bronze medalists)
3. (Denmark) Jeppe Skov Jespen / Per Mikkelsen (gold medalists)
4. (Denmark) Christian Hansen / Ole Krogh Mortensen (second round)
5. (Sweden) Curt Ingedahl / Bengt Randström (third round)
6. (Thailand) Sorasak Chompoonuchprapa / Pongsilpa Ritipong (quarterfinals)
7. (England) Abdul Malique / Graham Michael Robinson (second round)
8. (Thailand) Jiamsak Panitchaikul / Prapatana Vasavid (silver medalists)

=== Finals ===
Semifinals
1	(England) Peter Emptage (England) John Gardner	17	6
8	(Thailand) Jiamsak Panitchaikul (Thailand) Prapatana Vasavid	21	21
3	(Denmark) Jeppe Skov Jespen (Denmark) Per Mikkelsen	21	21
2	(India) Sushil Kumar Patet (India) Surendra Singh Pundir	14	14

Final
8	(Thailand) Jiamsak Panitchaikul (Thailand) Prapatana Vasavid	18	21	17
3	(Denmark) Jeppe Skov Jespen (Denmark) Per Mikkelsen	21	13	21

=== Top half ===
==== Section 1 ====
First round

Second round
1	(England) P Emptage (England) J Gardner	21	21
(Germany) D Eichhorn (Germany) D Hechler	5	11
(Sweden) R Kärvestad (Republic of Ireland) B McKee	21	21
(France) P Moucheboeuf (France) P Premat	12	16
5	(Sweden) C Ingedahl (Sweden) B Randström	21	21
(Denmark) H Andersen (Denmark) H Hautopp	11	15
(Canada) W Metcalfe (Russia) I Ponomarev	21	21
(Thailand) J Leraman (Thailand) M Phaemongkhon	7	9

Third round
1	(England) P Emptage (England) J Gardner	21	21
(Sweden) R Kärvestad (Republic of Ireland) B McKee	15	19
5	(Sweden) C Ingedahl (Sweden) B Randström	19	18
(Canada) W Metcalfe (Russia) I Ponomarev	21	21

Quarterfinals
1	(England) P Emptage (England) J Gardner	21	21
(Canada) W Metcalfe (Russia) I Ponomarev	11	6

==== Section 2 ====
First round

Second round
4	(Denmark) C Hansen (Denmark) O K Mortensen	21	18	15
(Malaysia) B Garip (Malaysia) A Linggian	18	21	21
(Germany) K Rosenkranz (Germany) W Schröder	21	19	21
(Poland) M Matusewicz (Poland) L Zacharzewski	18	21	13
8	(Thailand) J Panitchaikul (Thailand) P Vasavid	21	21
(Sweden) B C Bertilson (Norway) H Hansen	8	13
(England) L P Loo (England) S Sellick	22	21
(India) Doraimani (India) U R Abdul Wahab	20	16

Third round
(Malaysia) B Garip (Malaysia) A Linggian	21	21
(Germany) K Rosenkranz (Germany) W Schröder	7	13
8	(Thailand) J Panitchaikul (Thailand) P Vasavid	21	22
(England) L P Loo (England) S Sellick	8	20

Quarterfinals
(Malaysia) B Garip (Malaysia) A Linggian	12	15
8	(Thailand) J Panitchaikul (Thailand) P Vasavid	21	21

=== Bottom half ===
==== Section 3 ====
First round
(Poland) A Antosiewicz (Poland) A Struensee	6	10
(Malaysia) Lim Y S (Malaysia) Ong S O	21	21

Second round
(Malaysia) Lim Y S (Malaysia) Ong S O	21	21
(Czech Republic) L Tetur (Czech Republic) L Vorel	14	8
(Sweden) S Ohras (Sweden) B Stigson	11	14
6	(Thailand) S Chompoonuchprapa (Thailand) P Ritipong	21	21
(Finland) O Onninen (Finland) T Tennilä	14	14
(Germany) E Peschel (Germany) H-J Pothmann	21	21
(England) R J. Bell (England) D Chapman	12	25
3	(Denmark) J S Jespen (Denmark) P Mikkelsen	21	25

Third round
(Malaysia) Lim Y S (Malaysia) Ong S O	12	9
6	(Thailand) S Chompoonuchprapa (Thailand) P Ritipong	21	21
(Germany) E Peschel (Germany) H-J Pothmann	23	11
3	(Denmark) J S Jespen (Denmark) P Mikkelsen	25	21

Quarterfinals
6	(Thailand) S Chompoonuchprapa (Thailand) P Ritipong	14	14
3	(Denmark) J S Jespen (Denmark) P Mikkelsen	21	21

==== Section 4 ====
First round

Second round
(Japan) N Nakamura (Japan) K Takahashi	21	21
(France) J-L Ghenassia (France) Y Lepoivre	2	8
(Sri Lanka) J R U de Silva (Indonesia) F H Mainaky	23	21
7	(England) A Malique (England) G M Robinson	21	19
(Thailand) N Kulsavete (Thailand) S Saetang	21	18	21
(Poland) J Łański (Poland) J Rybicki	17	21	12
(Denmark) S Christensen (Denmark) P Dabelsteen	21	20	19
2	(India) S K Patet (India) S S Pundir	14	22	21

Third round
(Japan) N Nakamura (Japan) K Takahashi	21	19	17
(Sri Lanka) J R U de Silva (Indonesia) F H Mainaky	19	21	21
(Thailand) N Kulsavete (Thailand) S Saetang	18	16
2	(India) S K Patet (India) S S Pundir	21	21

Quarterfinals
(Sri Lanka) J R U de Silva (Indonesia) F H Mainaky	21	18	15
2	(India) S K Patet (India) S S Pundir	19	21	21

== Women's doubles ==
=== Seeds ===
1. (England) Betty Bartlett / Eileen M. Carley (silver medalists)
2. (England) Anna Bowskill / Sylvia Penn (bronze medalists)
3. (Canada) Siew Har Hong / (United States) Rose Lei (withdrew)
4. (England) Marguerite Butt / Brenda Creasey (gold medalists)

=== Finals ===
Semifinals
1	(England) Betty Bartlett (England) Eileen M. Carley	21	21
(Denmark) Gitte Attle Rasmussen (Sweden) Lieselotte Wengberg	10	10
4	(England) Marguerite Butt (England) Brenda Creasey	21	21
2	(England) Anna Bowskill (England) Sylvia Penn	9	8

Final
1	(England) Betty Bartlett (England) Eileen M. Carley	17	21	17
4	(England) Marguerite Butt (England) Brenda Creasey	21	19	21

=== Top half ===
==== Section 1 ====
First round	Second round				Quarterfinals
	1	(England) B Bartlett (England) E M. Carley	21	21
		(Japan) F Araki (Japan) M Namura	6	17
					1	(England) B Bartlett (England) E M. Carley	21	21
						(Switzerland) B Brunner (Sweden) G Johansson	10	9
	(Switzerland) B Brunner (Sweden) G Johansson		21	21
	(Germany) I Berdau (Germany) B Jörns-Schumann		13	11

==== Section 2 ====
First round	Second round					Quarterfinals
	3	(Canada) S H Hong (United States) R Lai
		(Denmark) G A Rasmussen (Sweden) L Wengberg	w	/	o
						(Denmark) G A Rasmussen (Sweden) L Wengberg	14	21	21
						(Finland) A Pelkonen (Finland) R Tuomela	21	19	14
	(India) P Nagalia (India) S V. John		17	21	10
	(Finland) A Pelkonen (Finland) R Tuomela		21	11	21

=== Bottom half ===
==== Section 3 ====
First round	Second round					Quarterfinals
	(Sweden) C Kruseborn (Finland) U Roinela		19	21	22
	(Germany) H Graef (Germany) H Hauser		21	19	20
							(Sweden) C Kruseborn (Finland) U Roinela	7	12
						4	(England) M Butt (England) B Creasey	21	21
		(Russia) O Dolina (Russia) N Nikitina	10	7
	4	(England) M Butt (England) B Creasey	21	21

==== Section 4 ====
First round	Second round				Quarterfinals
		(Germany) U Johannes (Germany) J Rahaus	21	21
	SUB	(India) S Chitre (India) S D'Souza	17	16
						(Germany) U Johannes (Germany) J Rahaus	16	19
					2	(England) A Bowskill (England) S Penn	21	21
		(France) M Bontemps (France) A Depierreux	8	15
	2	(England) A Bowskill (England) S Penn	21	21

== Mixed doubles ==
=== Seeds ===
1. (Canada) Henry Paynter / Siew Har Hong (silver medalists)
2. (Denmark) Christian Hansen / Gitte Attle Rasmussen (quarterfinals)
3. (Canada) William Metcalfe / (United States) Rose Lei (second round)
4. (England) Peter Emptage / Betty Bartlett (gold medalists)

=== Finals ===
Semifinals
1	(Canada) Henry Paynter (Canada) Siew Har Hong	21	22
(Denmark) Ole Krogh Mortensen (Denmark) Jette Nielsen	15	20
4	(England) Peter Emptage (England) Betty Bartlett	21	21
(England) Robert J. Bell (England) Eileen M. Carley	17	15

Final
1	(Canada) Henry Paynter (Canada) Siew Har Hong	19	15
4	(England) Peter Emptage (England) Betty Bartlett	21	21

=== Top half ===
==== Section 1 ====
First round
(Germany) D Hechler (Germany) H Hauser	20	19
(Sweden) B Stigson (Sweden) G Johansson	22	21
(Finland) O Onninen (Finland) U Roinela	12	12
(England) G M Robinson (England) B Creasey	21	21
(Japan) S Yamamoto (Japan) F Araki	16	14
(India) S K Patet (India) P Nagalia	21	21

Second round
1	(Canada) H Paynter (Canada) S H Hong	21	21
(Sweden) B Stigson (Sweden) G Johansson	9	19
(England) G M Robinson (England) B Creasey	21	14	21
(India) S K Patet (India) P Nagalia	15	21	11

Quarterfinals
1	(Canada) H Paynter (Canada) S H Hong	21	21
(England) G M Robinson (England) B Creasey	16	13

==== Section 2 ====
First round
(France) P Moucheboeuf (France) A Depierreux	6	11
(Denmark) O K Mortensen (Denmark) J Nielsen	21	21
(England) A Malique (England) S Penn	21	21
(India) S S Pundir (India) S D'Souza	10	17
(Sweden) S Ohras (Sweden) K Ekengren Gärtner	w	/	o
(Germany) W Schröder (Germany) B Jörns-Schumann

Second round
3	(Canada) W Metcalfe (United States) R Lei	14	15
(Denmark) O K Mortensen (Denmark) J Nielsen	21	21
(England) A Malique (England) S Penn	18	13
(Sweden) S Ohras (Sweden) K Ekengren Gärtner	21	21

Quarterfinals
(Denmark) O K Mortensen (Denmark) J Nielsen	11	21	21
(Sweden) S Ohras (Sweden) K Ekengren Gärtner	21	15	15

=== Bottom half ===
==== Section 3 ====
First round
(Poland) J Rybicki (Poland) K Cielecka	11	15
(France) P Premat (France) M Bontemps	21	21
(Thailand) S Rujanuwisan (Thailand) N Rujanawisan	15	17
(Sweden) B Randström (Sweden) C Kruseborn	21	21
(India) A K Sharma (India) S Chitre	15	21	14
(Japan) N Nakamura (Japan) K Shimamoto	21	13	21

Second round
(France) P Premat (France) M Bontemps	22	15	21
(Sweden) B Randström (Sweden) C Kruseborn	20	21	12
(Japan) N Nakamura (Japan) K Shimamoto	10	3
4	(England) P Emptage (England) B Bartlett	21	21

Quarterfinals
(France) P Premat (France) M Bontemps	18	13
4	(England) P Emptage (England) B Bartlett	21	21

==== Section 4 ====
First round
(Sweden) C Ingedahl (Sweden) E Carlander	21	21
(Russia) B Dolin (Russia) O Dolina	12	18
(India) D Surti (India) S V. John	17	17
(England) R J. Bell (England) E M. Carley	21	21
(France) G Vioulès (France) F Bocquet	19	16
(Germany) B U Brüsewitz (Germany) H Graef	21	21

Second round
(Sweden) C Ingedahl (Sweden) E Carlander	13	10
(England) R J. Bell (England) E M. Carley	21	21
(Germany) B U Brüsewitz (Germany) H Graef	16	9
2	(Denmark) C Hansen (Denmark) G A Rasmussen	21	21

Quarterfinals
(England) R J. Bell (England) E M. Carley	21	21
2	(Denmark) C Hansen (Denmark) G A Rasmussen	18	15
