= Vital Records Act of 1977 =

1977 Tennessee law

The Vital Records Act of 1977 is a Tennessee statute that prohibits individuals from changing their sex on the original birth certificate as a result of sex change surgery. Tennessee is the only state specifically forbidding the correction of sex designations on birth certificates of transgender people.
