= Legal gender =

Sex or gender recognized by law

Territories recognising gender self-identification for legal gender as of May 2025

World map of legal recognition of non-binary gender

Legal gender, or legal sex, is a legal authority's classification of a person's gender or sex (terms which, while distinct, are often used interchangeably in such contexts). Biological sex, sex reassignment and gender identity are used to determine legal gender. The details vary by jurisdiction. Legal gender identity is fundamental to many legal rights and obligations, including access to healthcare, work, and family relationships, as well as issues of personal identification and documentation. The complexities involved in determining legal gender, despite the seeming simplicity of the underlying principles, highlight the dynamic interaction between biological characteristics, self-identified gender identity, societal norms, and changing legal standards. Because of this, the study of legal gender is a complex field that is influenced by cultural, historical, and legal factors. As such, a thorough investigation is necessary to fully understand the subject's implications and breadth within a range of legal systems and societies.

== History ==
In European societies, Roman law, post-classical canon law, and later common law, referred to a person's sex as male, female or hermaphrodite, with legal rights as male or female depending on the characteristics that appeared most dominant. Under Roman law, a hermaphrodite had to be classed as either male or female. The 12th-century Decretum Gratiani states that "Whether an hermaphrodite may witness a testament, depends on which sex prevails". The foundation of common law, the 16th century Institutes of the Lawes of England, described how a hermaphrodite could inherit "either as male or female, according to that kind of sexe which doth prevaile." Legal cases where legal sex was placed in doubt have been described over the centuries.

In 1930, Lili Elbe received sexual reassignment surgery and an ovary transplant and changed her legal gender to female. A few weeks after Elbe had her final surgery in 1931 including uterus transplant and vaginoplasty, immune rejection of the transplanted uterus caused her death. In 1931, Dora Richter underwent removal of the penis and vaginoplasty. In May 1933, the Institute for Sexual Research was attacked by Nazis, losing any surviving records about Richter.

Toni Ebel and her partner Charlotte Charlaque, who were both other German sexual reassignment surgery recipients, were forced to separate in 1942 after harassment from their neighbors.

After World War II, transgender issues received public attention again. Legislation in the 1950s and 60s primarily focused on criminalizing homosexuality and enforcing heteronormative gender roles, leading to disproportionate police harassment and arrests of gender non-conforming individuals. Christine Jorgensen was unable to marry a man because her birth certificate listed her as male. Some transgender people changed their birth certificates, but the validity of these documents was challenged. In the United Kingdom, Sir Ewan Forbes' case recognized the process of legal gender change. However, legal gender change was not recognized in Corbett v Corbett. The 1969 Stonewall Uprising marked a pivotal moment in the gay rights movement, sparking protests and marches globally and underscoring ongoing discrimination and violence against LGBT individuals.

Today, many jurisdictions allow transgender individuals to change their legal gender, but some jurisdictions require sterilization, childlessness or an unmarried status for legal gender change. In some cases, gender-affirming surgery is a requirement for legal recognition.

== See also ==
- Same-sex marriage
- sex
- Gender identity
- Gender Recognition Act (Norway)
- Gender Recognition Panel
- Legal status of transgender people
- Legal recognition of non-binary gender
- Sex assignment
- Gender-affirming surgery
- LGBT rights by country or territory
