= Eldorado (Berlin) =

Pre-WW2 nightclub district in Berlin, Germany

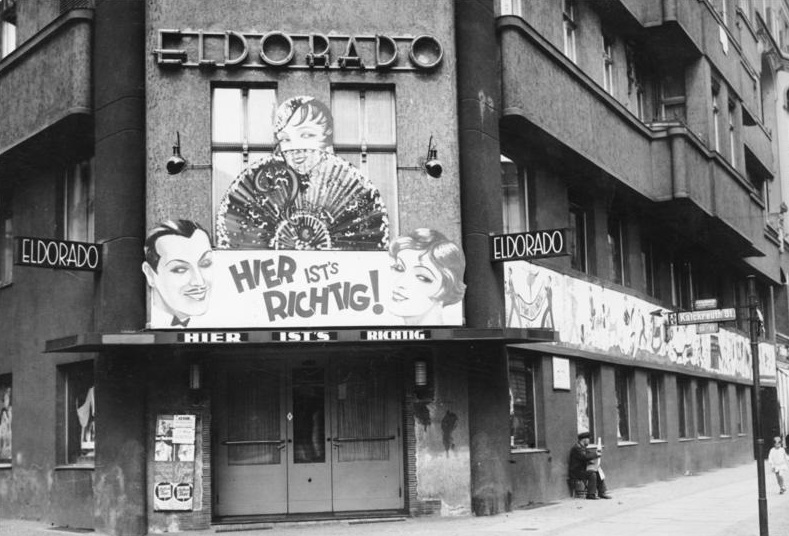
- Eldorado at Motzstr. 15 (current No. 24), Berlin (1932)
- Interactive map of Eldorado
- Address: Berlin, German Reich
- Coordinates: 52°29′53″N 13°20′56″E
- Owner: Ludwig Konjetschni

The Eldorado was the name of multiple nightclubs and performance venues in Berlin before the Nazi era and World War II. The name of the cabaret Eldorado has become an integral part of the popular iconography of the Weimar Republic. Two of the five locations the club occupied in its history are known to have catered to a gay crowd, although attendees would have included not only gay, lesbian, and bisexual patrons but also those identifying as heterosexual (some of whom were artists, authors, celebrities, or tourists).

"Cross-dressing" was tolerated on the premises, though for the most part legally prohibited and/or sharply regulated in public (and to an extent in private) at the time. This exception to everyday life attracted not only male patrons who wished to dress in the "clothing of the opposite sex" but also women who wished to do the same. Wealthy onlookers were encouraged to come and drink and watch as so-called "Zechenmacher" (tab payers).

The practice was particularly common in so-called "lesbian bars" or "lesbian balls" in the neighborhood at the time, and up to the 1960s in places like the Nationalhof at nearby Bülowstraße 37. As women's incomes were then on average much lower than men's, male spectators with money to spend were explicitly welcome, and it was not uncommon for there to be sex workers present to offer their services.

However, the eradication during the Nazi period of any and all references to queer life in Germany was so thorough that very little explicit public, or even archival, reference to the clubs' queer history remained by 1945. Criminalization made researching, speaking, or writing about queer realities a legal risk during the first decades following WWII, not only in Germany. That the cabaret Eldorado is remembered at all is due in no small part to its central role in inspiring the novels of the Anglo-American author Christopher Isherwood, and to the Broadway musical and 1972 film Cabaret, which was inspired by Isherwood's novels. At the same time, historians and activists of the gay liberation movement and of the ensuing LGBTQ movements began piecing back together what is now called LGBTQ history. Eldorado thereby became a prominent part of the telling of LGBTQ histories.

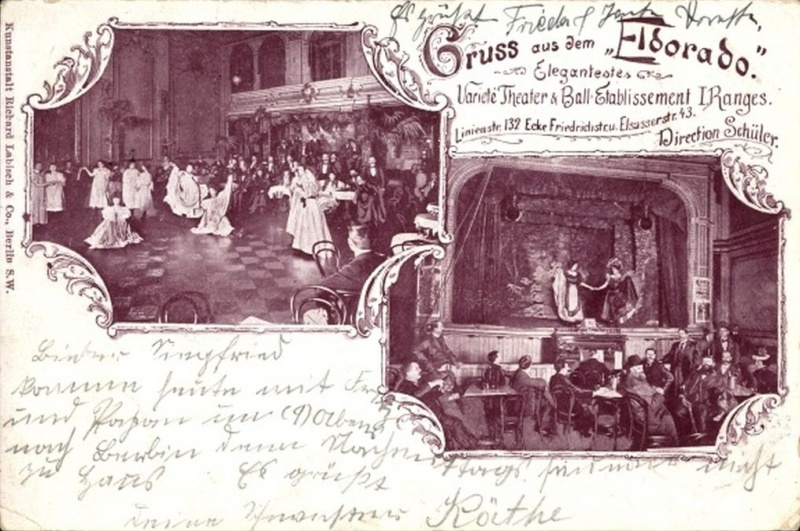
Postcard for Eldorado (1900), a theatre formally located at Elsässer Straße

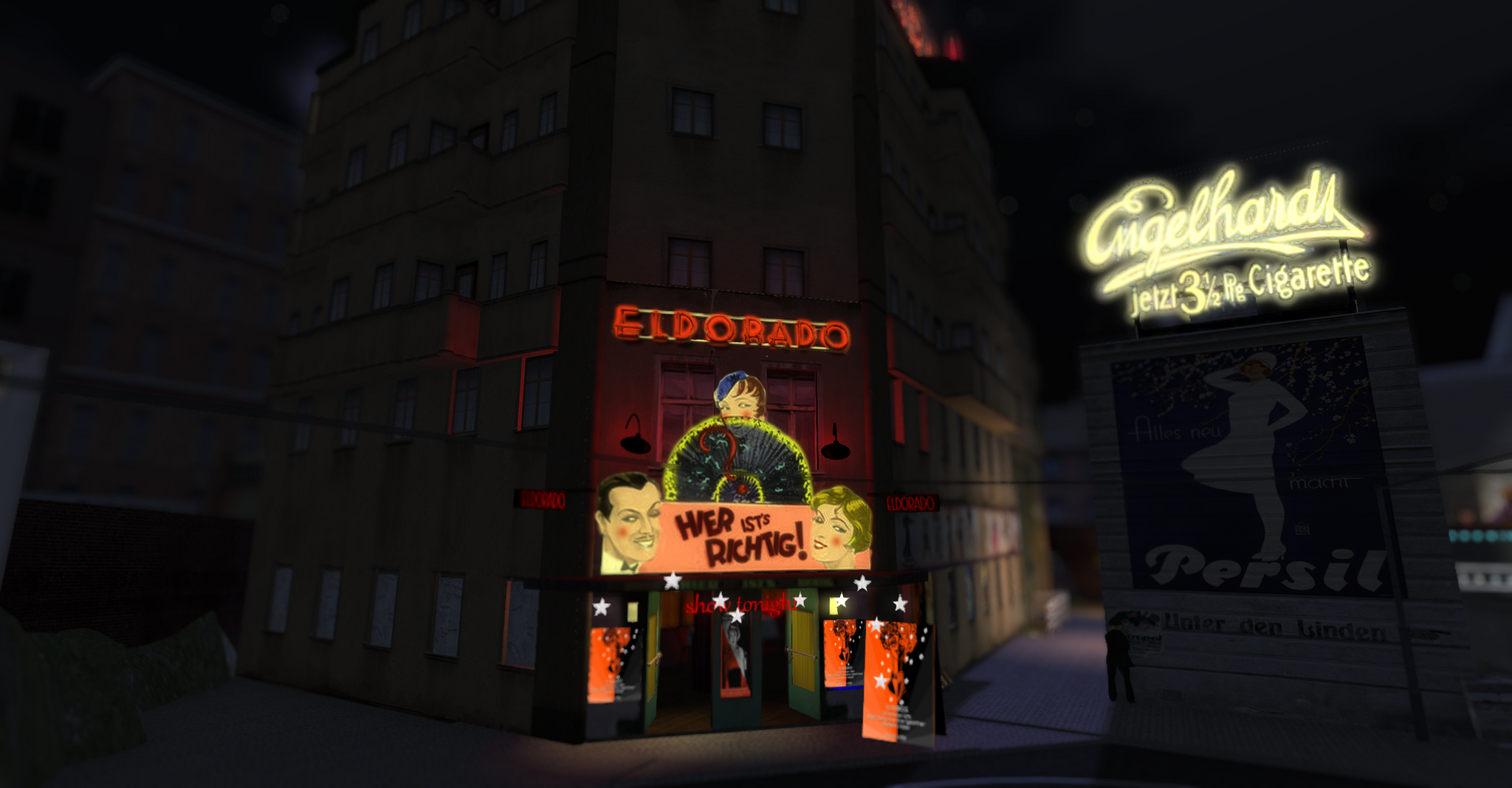
A 2013 digital tribute of the Eldorado at Motzstr. 15 on Second Life, "1920s Berlin Project"

== Former locations ==
These are some of the known locations of Eldorado, listed by descending date of opening:

- Thorstraße 12, Berlin (address changed to Torstraße with an unknown number); this location was active as the Eldorado as early as 1848 (however, this location had a different owner).
- Alte Jakobstraße 60, Berlin-Mitte; named the "Eldorado–Diele" and advertised as "a cozy home for older men"
- Kantstraße 24, Charlottenburg, Berlin; active form c. 1920 – before 1928, and advertised as the “meeting point of the international sophisticated world”.
- Lutherstraße 31/32, Nollendorfkiez area of Schöneberg, Berlin (in 1963, the street name and address changed to MartinLutherStraße 13); active as the Eldorado from 1926 until 1930.
- Motzstraße 15/Kalckreuthstraße 11, Nollendorfkiez area of Schöneberg, Berlin, (a corner location, the address has changed to Motzstraße 24/Kalckreuthstraße 11); active as the Eldorado from 1928 until c. December 1932.

== History ==
Ludwig Konjetschni owned three of the Eldorado locations (Kantstraße, Lutherstraße, Motzstraße), two of which were known gay spaces (Lutherstraße, and Motzstraße). Many of the details about the history of the Lutherstraße club were published in the German book Ein Führer durch das lasterhafte Berlin: Das deutsche Babylon 1931 (English: A Guide Through Licentious Berlin: The German Babylon 1931) authored by Curt Moreck (pseudonym for Konrad Haemmerling); and the German book Berlins lesbische Frauen (1928) authored by Ruth Margarete Roellig.

Paragraph 175, a provision in the German Criminal Code from 1871 until 1994, made homosexual acts between males a crime. Places like Eldorado offered same-sex dancing partners through a membership system; they issued coins.

The performances at the club were diverse and included effeminate men dancing whilst dressed in women's clothing, and a man singing Parisian-sounding songs in a high-pitched soprano. Marlene Dietrich performed at the club. Additionally they would throw fancy balls and costume parties. Eldorado also included what have come to be called drag shows as a regular part of the cabaret performances. There were numerous somewhat similar establishments to Eldorado during its day. The club has been described by writers and artists, and has been immortalized in paintings and photographs.

=== Closure of Motzstraße 15 ===
In December 1932, the Berlin Police President Kurt Melcher ordered a closure of all the "homosexual dance pleasures"; this forced closure of more than a dozen clubs. A few weeks later the Nazis were in power. Ernst Röhm was a regular at the club prior to the closure. Hitler was appointed chancellor in January 1933, and shortly afterward the Nazis seized the club space at Motzstraße 15 to use it as the Sturmabteilung (SA) headquarters. By May 1933, Berlin's Institut für Sexualwissenschaft ("Institute for Sexual Science") was also raided by the Nazis.

Starting in 2015, the location is an organic grocery store.

== Legacy ==
The club was written about in the German nonfiction book Ein Führer durch das lasterhafte Berlin: Das deutsche Babylon 1931 (English: A Guide Through Licentious Berlin: The German Babylon 1931), authored by Curt Moreck (pseudonym for Konrad Haemmerling). Two of the fiction novels by Christopher Isherwood are partially set at the Eldorado; Mr Norris Changes Trains (1935; U.S. edition titled The Last of Mr Norris) and Goodbye to Berlin (1939).

Artist Christian Schad painted the portrait Count St. Genois d'Anneaucourt in 1927 (1927) which is now held at the Centre Pompidou; on the right side of the painting is a well-known transsexual who was a regular at the Eldorado. Otto Dix's watercolor painting Eldorado (1927) and Ernst Fritsch's triptych painting Erinnerung an Eldorado (1929) immortalized the club.

Largely overlooked in the telling of Eldorado's LGBTQ history is the building at (former) Motzstraße 15's role in the West German beginnings of the second gay and lesbian movement. Coincidentally, it was in former Motzstraße 15, by that time renumbered as Motzstraße 24, where the founders of the first lesbian and gay organization in Germany after World War II officially formed a group called the Homosexuelle Aktion Westberlin (HAW) on 15 August 1971. The HAW gave rise to the West German LGBTQ movement, and to an extent to the former East German LGBTQ movement. The group's relative obscurity in the present could in part be due some of its members' expressed political ideas at that time, that may seem politically inopportune to some in the political atmosphere of the present day.

The first Berlin radio station that featured gay content, Eldoradio (1985–1991) was named after the nightclub.

In 2023, Netflix released the documentary Eldorado: Everything the Nazis Hate.

== Notable people ==
A list of notable people associated with the Eldorado club:

- W. H. Auden
- Marlene Dietrich
- Otto Dix
- Magnus Hirschfeld
- Christopher Isherwood
- Egon Erwin Kisch
- Erika Mann
- Klaus Mann
- Ruth Margarete Roellig
- Ernst Röhm

== See also ==
- List of LGBTQ bars
- Timeline of LGBTQ history in Germany
