= Erwin Gohrbandt =

German surgeon

Erwin Gohrbandt (September 20, 1890, in Schlawe, Pomerania, (Polish - Sławno, north-western Poland) – January 3, 1965, in West Berlin) was a German surgeon who held several important positions during Nazi rule. Gohrbandt served as vice president of the Berlin regional association of the German Red Cross. He was also a member of the German Olympic Society. In 1950-51 he was chairman of the Berlin Surgical Society.

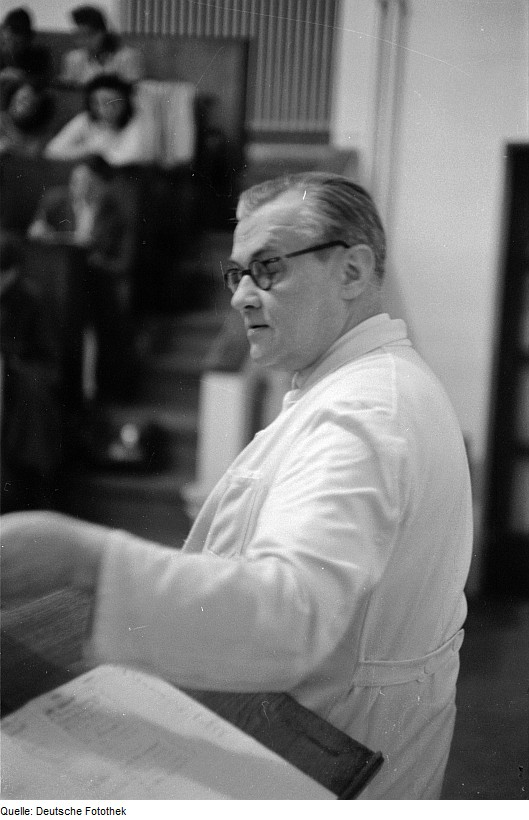
Erwin Gohrbandt as a teacher, in 1947

His younger brother Paul Gohrbandt (1896–1975) was also a doctor.

== Life ==
After graduating from high school in Treptow an der Rega in 1910, Gohrbandt studied medicine from 1910 to 1914 at the Kaiser Wilhelm Academy for Military Medical Education in Berlin. In 1910 he became a member of the Pépinière Corps Franconia. At the beginning of the First World War he was drafted into military service as a junior doctor. During his military service, he passed the state examination in January 1915 and received his medical license in 1917.

=== Before the Second World War ===
He was then assigned to the Pathological Institute of the Charité. Between 1920 and 1928 he worked at the surgical university clinic of the Charité, from 1924 as senior physician and head of the pediatric surgery department. In 1924, he habilitated in surgery and began teaching. On June 6, 1928, he was appointed associate professor of surgery at the Friedrich Wilhelm University in Berlin. In the same year, he moved to the city hospital Am Urban as chief physician of the II. Surgical Department.

In 1931, Gohrbandt, with Ludwig Levy-Lenz, was one of the first surgeons to perform sex reassignment surgery with vaginoplasty on some transgender patients - a pioneering experimental achievement at the time. Known by name are the patients Dora Richter, a domestic worker at the Institute for Sexology under Magnus Hirschfeld, and the Danish artist Lili Elbe.

During Nazi Germany, Gohrbandt was a research assistant for surgical questions in the Social Office of the Reich Youth Leader.

=== During the Second World War ===
From August 1939, Gohrbandt was a consultant surgeon to the army and (from 1940) as the inspector of medical services in the Luftwaffe.

With effect from October 1, 1940, he became Head of the Surgical Department at the Municipal Robert Koch Hospital and at the same time became Clinic Director of the Third Appointed Surgical University Clinic. From 1944 he was a member of the scientific advisory board of the General Commissioner for the Sanitation and Health Service, Karl Brandt. On October 26 and 27 of 1942 at Deutscher Hog Hotel, Nuremberg, Gohrbandt participated in a secret conference during which Sigmund Rascher and Georg August Weltz spoke on topics related to the freezing experiments conducted in prisoners of the Dachau concentration camp. He later published their results in the journal Zentralblatt für Chirurgie in 1945.

=== Post-war period ===
In Doctor's Trial exhibit Schroeder 9, "Affidavit concerning Oskar Schroeder's professional and personal values", Erwin Gohrbandt states that he was a very close friend of Oskar Schröder. In the post-war period, he was Ferdinand Sauerbruch's deputy in the office of the city council for health care in all of Berlin. He was commissioned by the Soviet military administration in Germany and the Berlin magistrate to ensure sanitation and to monitor hygiene regulations. He drove the reconstruction of the war-damaged Moabit Hospital and headed its surgical department until December 31, 1958. At the same time, he resumed his lectures at the newly founded Free University of Berlin and published the Central Journal for Surgery in 1946. Effective December 31, 1958, he retired. He ran an outpatient clinic in Berlin-Tiergarten until his death in 1965.

== Honours ==
- Iron Cross 2nd and 1st Class (First World War)
- Knight's Cross of the War Merit Cross with Swords (February 1, 1945)
- Grand Cross of Merit of the Federal Republic of Germany (1952)
- Honorary professorship at the TH Berlin (1956)
- Honorary member of the Berlin Surgical Society (1958)

== Works ==
- 1928: Lehrbuch der Kinderchirurgie, 1928
- 1936: Chirurgische Fragen der Kinderheilkunde in der Praxis, 1936

As an editor

- Zentralblatt für Chirurgie
