= Butterfly Music Transgender Chorus =

The Butterfly Music Transgender Chorus was a Boston-based non-audition chorus that supported the transgender community through music, outreach, and research. Founded in 2014 by Sandi Hammond, faculty member at the New School of Music in Cambridge, Massachusetts. It is thought to have been the second transgender choir in the nation, the first being the Transcendence Gospel Choir of San Francisco. The chorus held its first public performance on April 9, 2015, at the First Church in Boston.

During the following two years, the chorus received a large amount of local and nation media attention, garnering stories in O, The Oprah Magazine, Local and National NPR stations, ABC News and others.

The Butterfly Music Transgender Chorus does not exist anymore. After two sold-out debut concerts in downtown Boston, Hammond stepped down in October 2016. during an intense debate about the impact of media exposure on the group and also the fact that she herself is not trans. A small group of volunteers continued a self-led, volunteer song-circle for several months under the new name, Boston Trans Chorus.

The Butterfly Music Transgender Chorus has sparked the creation of similar groups in Chicago, Los Angeles, Atlanta, Kansas City, and Manchester, New Hampshire.
