= Toni Ebel =

German painter and trans woman (1881–1961)

- Self-portrait, 1955
- Born: 10 November 1881; Berlin, German Empire
- Died: 9 June 1961 (aged 79); East Berlin, East Germany
- Occupation: painter
- Partner: Charlotte Charlaque

Toni Ebel (10 November 1881 – 9 June 1961) was a German painter, housekeeping staff of the Institut für Sexualwissenschaft, and one of the first trans women to receive gender-affirming surgery.

== Life and work ==
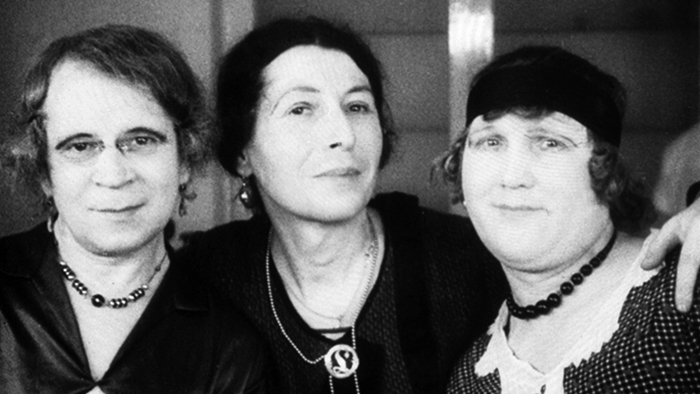
From left to right: Toni Ebel, Charlotte Charlaque and Dora Richter, ca. 1933

Toni Ebel was the oldest of eleven children of an evangelical family. After graduating from high school, Ebel apprenticed as a decorator and businessperson. With her first paycheck, she bought a wig and a dress, which were discovered and burnt by her parents. Around 1901 she fell in love with a man, which caused arguments with her family, so she left home for Munich, where she studied painting. She also traveled around Germany, Austria, and Italy. In Venice, Ebel met an elderly American man, who became her patron and partner for a few years. In 1908, Ebel returned to Berlin and lived as a man, married a woman named Olga, and had a son. Ebel did not feel comfortable playing the role of a man and husband, and tried four times to die by suicide. Around this period she, under her deadname, gained a good reputation in the artistic circles of Käthe Kollwitz. In 1916, she was drafted into the army, fighting in the Meuse-Argonne Offensive in Champagne. She was discharged to the reserves after suffering a mental breakdown. In 1925, Ebel became, temporarily, a member of the USPD. She later described herself as having been "always a proletarian painter".

After Olga fell ill and died in 1928, Ebel, who lived and worked as a painter first in Berlin-Steglitz, then in Wedding, decided to transition. Around this time, she met Charlotte Charlaque, who was also transitioning. She made a formal application for a legal name change to Annie in 1929, which was rejected. Her name change to Toni was accepted in 1930. With the support of Magnus Hirschfeld, Ebel underwent five gender confirmation surgeries conducted by Erwin Gohrbandt, Felix Abraham and Ludwig Levy-Lenz. She was among the first individuals to have undergone gender confirmation surgery. According to the surgeons, the first operation for both Ebel and Charlaque took place "between 6 January 1929 and 14 November 1930", and according to Ragnar Ahlstedt, Ebel was the third patient to have received that procedure ever. In 1931, Felix Abraham published a paper giving the details of the vaginoplasty operations on Ebel and Dora Richter in Zeitschrift für Sexualwissenschaft und Sexualpolitik. (Journal of Sexology and Sexual Politics)

In 1933, footage of Ebel, Charlaque, and Dora Richter (all anonymously/uncredited) was used as a documentary segment in the Austrian movie Mysterium des Geschlechtes (Mystery of Sex) about contemporary sexology. The same year, Ebel and Charlaque hosted Swede Ragnar Ahlstedt, who wrote about them in the book Män, som blivit kvinnor (Men, who became women), but they did not mention Richter to him. When the Institut für Sexualwissenschaft (Institute of Sexology) was attacked in 1933, a collection of Ebel's drawings and paintings was destroyed.

In 1933, Ebel converted to Judaism, the faith of Charlaque, her partner. Both lived in modest circumstances in a sublet at Nollendorfstrasse 24 in Berlin-Schöneberg. Ebel received a small pension and earned some additional income from the sale of pictures. They were repeatedly harassed by their neighbours, and in 1942, they were forced to separate. After a warning from her half-sister, Ebel fled to Czechoslovakia with Charlaque in 1934. Until 1935, they lived in the Karlovy Vary (Rybáře), where Ebel painted pictures for guests of the spa. They then moved to Prague, and in 1937, to Brno, where they kept in touch with Karl Giese up until his suicide. Ebel lived in Prague under the name Antonia Ebelova and worked as a painter. In 1942, Charlaque was arrested by the Aliens Police; she later managed to go to the United States.

After the end of the war, Ebel lived in East Germany, where she received a small pension as a victim of the "racial prejudice" of National Socialism, and continued to work as a painter. She mainly created landscape pictures and portraits, and received attention in East Germany from the 1950s on. She was a member of the Association of Visual Artists of East Germany and was represented at the German art exhibitions in Dresden in 1953, 1958/1959, and 1962/1963. Her gender was not questioned, even with many noticing her "low voice".

== Selected works ==
- Selbstporträt (Oil painting; exhibited at the Fourth German Art Exhibition in 1958/1959)
- Fallobst (Oil painting; exhibited at the Fourth German Art Exhibition in 1958/1959)
- Arbeiterveteran (Oil painting; exhibited at the Fifth German Art Exhibition in 1962/1963)
- Bildnis meiner Schwester (Oil painting; exhibited at the Fifth German Art Exhibition in 1962/1963)
- Wissen ist Macht (Oil painting; exhibited at the Fourth German Art Exhibition in 1958/1959)
