= Dora Richter =

German trans woman (1892–1966)

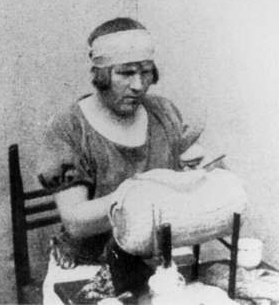
- Born: 16 April 1892; Seifen, Austria-Hungary
- Died: 26 April 1966 (aged 74); Allersberg, West Germany
- Other names: Dörchen Richter; Dora Rudolfa Richterová
- Occupations: domestic servant; cook; chef; restaurateur; lace maker
- Known for: first known trans woman to undergo male-to-female sex reassignment surgery

Dora Rudolfine Richter (16 April 1892 – 26 April 1966) was a German trans woman and the first known person to undergo complete male-to-female gender-affirming surgery. She was one of a number of transgender people in the care of sex-research pioneer Magnus Hirschfeld at Berlin's Institute for Sexual Research during the 1920s and early 1930s. She underwent surgical removal of the testicles in 1922, followed in 1931 by removal of the penis and vaginoplasty. Richter died at the age of 74 in Allersberg, Bavaria, on 26 April 1966.

== Early life ==
Richter was born as the second child of seven in Seifen (now Ryžovna), a small town in the Ore Mountains region of Bohemia, to a poor farming family on 16 April 1892. Her mother was Antonia Richter (née Kraus), and her father, Josef Richter, was a musician. She was baptized into the Catholic Church on 17 April 1892.

Early in childhood, Richter displayed a "tendency to act and carry on in a feminine way". At the age of 6, she apparently tried to remove her penis with a tourniquet.

In 1909, after a baker apprenticeship, she left her small town and moved to a bigger one, where she continued to dress as a girl in her free time. She joined a wandering theater troupe and moved to Leipzig, where she stayed for two years. In 1916, she got drafted to the army, but was discharged in just two weeks. From Leipzig she came back to her hometown, where she was encouraged by a friend to go to Magnus Hirschfeld's practice in Berlin.

While living in Berlin, Richter worked as a cook and waiter at hotels using her birth name and presenting herself as a man. She was arrested several times in Berlin for dressing in women's clothes in public and was sent to male prisons.

== Surgeries ==
In 1922, Richter underwent an orchiectomy, a surgical removal of the testicles, performed by Berlin surgeon Erwin Gohrbandt at the Charité Universitätsmedizin. From May 1923, she worked with other transgender people as a domestic servant at Magnus Hirschfeld's Institute for Sexual Research, one of the few places where a trans person could be employed, where she was affectionately nicknamed "Dörchen" by Hirschfeld.

In early 1931, Richter had a penectomy performed by Institute physician Ludwig Levy-Lenz, and in June that year an artificial vagina was surgically grafted by Gohrbandt, making her the first recorded transgender woman to undergo vaginoplasty.

In 1931, Felix Abraham, a psychiatrist working at the institute, published a paper about Richter's (and Toni Ebel's) gender confirming surgeries as a case study in the Zeitschrift für Sexualwissenschaft und Sexualpolitik: "Her castration had the effect – albeit not very extensive – of making her body become fuller, restricting her beard growth, making visible the first signs of breast development, and giving the pelvic fat pad... a more feminine shape."

== Later years ==
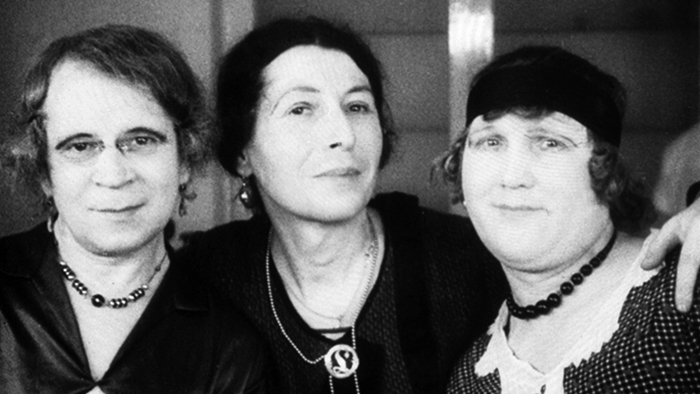
From left to right: Toni Ebel, Charlotte Charlaque and Dora Richter, c. 1933

In late 1931, Richter was working as a chef at Restaurant Kempinski (modern Hotel Bristol) at Kurfürstendamm 27.

In 1933, footage of Richter and two other of Hirschfeld's trans patients, Toni Ebel and Charlotte Charlaque (all anonymously/uncredited) was used as a documentary segment in the Austrian film Mysterium des Geschlechtes (Mystery of Gender), directed by Lothar Golte and Carl Kurzmayer about contemporary sexology.

In May 1933, with growing Nazi influence in Germany (Hirschfeld had fled the country), a mob of students attacked the institute, and the state authorities then burned its records. Richter's fate after this incident remained unknown for many years, and researchers assumed that she had died during the attack. However, in the March 1955 issue of American magazine ONE, Charlotte Charlaque, who fled Germany to Karlsbad in 1933, wrote in a pseudonymized article about Hirschfeld's trans patients, that Dora Richter, "[...]born in Karlsbad, (Note: Some sources such as Charlotte Charlaque's 1955 article incorrectly list Karlsbad as Richter's birthplace, but her baptismal record lists Seifen (later renamed as Ryžovna) as her birthplace.) Bohemia[...] soon became an owner of a small restaurant in the city of her birth". Furthermore, in 2023, researchers discovered that Richter applied for a legal name change in February 1934, granted by the president of Czechoslovakia in April 1934. At this time, her address was still listed in Berlin. From then on, her legal name was Dora Rudolfine Richter (in the Czech form: Dora Rudolfa Richterová).

According to 1939 Census records from Prague's National Archives, Richter was living in a house that she owned in her birthplace of Ryžovna as of 17 May 1939, was unmarried and earned her living as a homework lace maker. Her employer was listed as Berta Kolitsch, who traded in bobbin lace.

Richter lived in Ryžovna until 1946. With the forcible expulsion of Germans from Czechoslovakia in 1946, she moved to Allersberg, Bavaria, where she lived until her death at the age of 74 on 26 April 1966.

== In popular culture ==
Richter was portrayed by German actor Tima die Göttliche in the 1999 German film The Einstein of Sex, a biopic about Magnus Hirschfeld directed by Rosa von Praunheim.
