= Transcendence Gospel Choir =

The Transcendence Gospel Choir, based in the San Francisco Bay Area, is the first documented transgender gospel choir. It was founded in 2001 by record producer Ashley Wai'olu Moore, with Yvonne Evans as its first conductor, and was a community choir and music ministry affiliated with the City of Refuge United Church of Christ.

The choir performed at the San Francisco LGBT Community Center opening. In 2003, the choir performed at an LGBT interfaith conference in Philadelphia and the United Church of Christ national Synod meeting and influenced the church passing resolutions affirming transgender participation and ministry as well as denouncing violence against trans- and gender non-conforming people.

By 2014, a second U.S. transgender choir, Butterfly Music Transgender Chorus, debuted in Boston, garnering significant media attention for its organization and for transgender participation in music and culture.
