= Charlotte Charlaque =

German-American transgender actress (1892–1963)

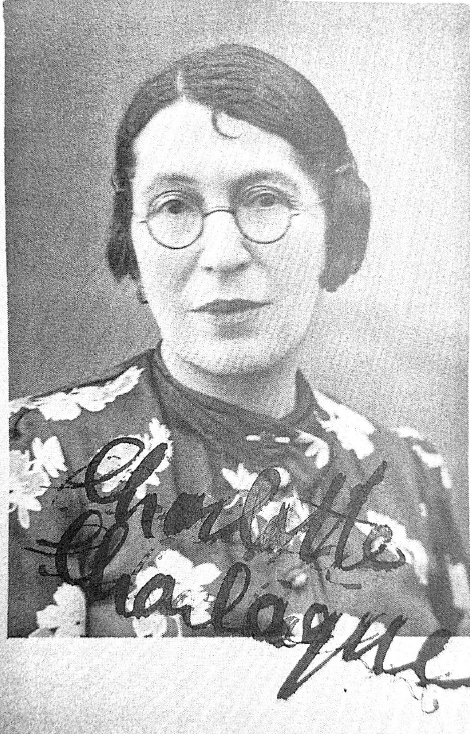
- Born: 14 September 1892; Berlin-Schöneberg
- Died: 6 February 1963 (aged 70); New York
- Occupations: Actor, singer, translator
- Partner: Toni Ebel

Charlotte Charlaque (14 September 1892 – 6 February 1963) was a German–American actress. She was an early trans activist and one of the first people to undergo gender reassignment surgery.

== Life and work ==
Charlotte Charlaque was born the second child of a German-Jewish family in Berlin-Schöneberg. The misleading statement that Charlaque was born in Mährisch Schönberg (Šumperk) in what is now the Czech Republic is based on Charlaque's repeated efforts after 1933 to disguise her origins so that she would not be handed over to Nazi Germany as a German Jew or Jewish trans woman. Her real birth certificate was found in 2023.

Charlaque initially grew up in Berlin, where her father ran a manufactured goods shop. He emigrated to the United States in 1901, and his wife and two children followed him the following year. The family settled in San Francisco. After the parents divorced, the mother and her eldest son moved back to Germany. Charlaque first went to Chicago and from there to New York City, where she trained as a violinist. In the summer of 1922, however, she also returned to Germany, according to her US passport, for study purposes.

== In Berlin ==
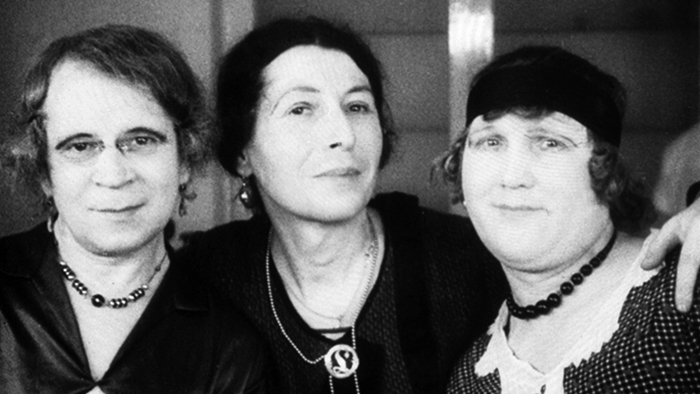
From left to right: Toni Ebel, Charlotte Charlaque and Dora Richter, ca. 1933

In her early years in Berlin, Charlaque performed as a singer, dancer and actress, later she also worked as a language teacher and translator as well as a receptionist at Magnus Hirschfeld's Institute for Sexual Science. One of her tasks here was to advise "transvestite" patients on their choice of clothes. In 1929, Charlaque also accompanied Magnus Hirschfeld and his partner Karl Giese to the third international congress of the World League for Sexual Reform (WLSR) in London. Around this time, between 1929 and 1931, Charlaque underwent gender reassignment surgery in Berlin. Alongside the kitchen assistant Dora Richter and the painter Toni Ebel, with whom she was friends, she was one of the first three known cases of gender reassignment surgery worldwide. In 1933, all three women appeared briefly in the Austrian film Mysterium des Geschlechts (Mystery of Sex) by Lothar Golte. Around the same time, Charlaque and Ebel gave an interview to the Swedish journalist Ragnar Ahlstedt (1901–1982), in which they provided insights into their lives and their life situations at the time.

== Escape to Czechoslovakia ==
Charlaque was in a relationship with Ebel and the two women lived together from around 1932. As Charlotte Charlaque was Jewish, Toni Ebel converted to Judaism in the early 1930s and both women were staunch opponents of National Socialism, they fled together to Czechoslovakia in the spring of 1934, where they first settled in Karlovy Vary and later in Brno and Prague. While Ebel painted pictures for spa guests and other clients, Charlaque taught English and French, probably also to Jews who were fleeing persecution by the German National Socialists.

A few months before the invasion of Czechoslovakia by the German Wehrmacht on 15 March 1939 and the establishment of the "Protectorate of Bohemia and Moravia", events came to a head for Charlaque and Ebel. Their homes were searched and Ebel in particular was soon considered an "uninvited foreigner" in Czechoslovakia. The move from Brno to Prague was only a temporary relief for the two.

Charlaque was arrested by the Prague immigration police on 19 March 1942, after the authorities found out that she was Jewish. She was originally supposed to be interned in Theresienstadt and an identification card had already been created for her. However, Ebel managed to convince the Swiss consul in Prague that her lover was an American citizen by means that had not yet been fully clarified. The only reason she no longer had valid identification papers was because she had handed them over to the American vice consul in Vienna to obtain a new passport. What Ebel failed to mention was that the vice consul in Vienna had refused to issue Charlaque's passport in a female name.

Charlaque was then transferred to the Liebenau internment camp. From here, she was sent to the USA together with other non-German women and children who were intended to be exchanged for Americans and British women of German origin. Ebel remained behind in Prague alone.

== In New York ==
Charlaque arrived in New York City on 2 July 1942, where she remained for the rest of her life. She was dependent on pain relief for long periods and suffered from poor health. Nevertheless, she managed to make a name for herself as an off-Broadway actress and to celebrate success on stage. In September 1944, for example, she performed at the Continental Club and Restaurant on Sullivan Street, accompanied by the German-Jewish pianist Fred Witt (actually Sigismund Witt, 1898–1946). Alluding to her birth name, she now liked to call herself Carlotta Baroness von Curtius; she also published a text under this pseudonym in the homophile magazine One in 1955. In her private life, she was in contact with the German-American doctor and endocrinologist Harry Benjamin, the "cross-dresser" Louise Lawrence (1912–1976) and Christine Jorgensen, who attracted a great deal of media attention in the course of her gender reassignment in 1952.

Charlaque died completely impoverished in New York on 6 February 1963. At a funeral service a few days later, she was honored in a memorial speech by William Glenesk (1926–2014), who was known as an innovative clergyman and later also as an advocate for people from the LGBTIQ spectrum.
