= Karl Giese =

German archivist and curator (1898-1938)

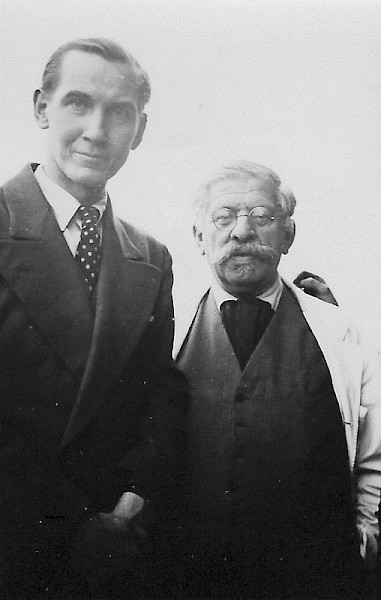
- Karl Giese and Magnus Hirschfeld. Photo from archive of Magnus-Hirschfeld-Gesellschaft
- Born: 18 October 1898; German Empire
- Died: 16 March 1938 (aged 39); Brno, Czechoslovakia
- Known for: Institut für Sexualwissenschaft
- Partner: Magnus Hirschfeld

Karl Giese (18 October 1898 – March 1938) was a German archivist, museum curator, and the life partner of Magnus Hirschfeld.

== Biography ==
=== Early years ===
Giese was the youngest of six children of a working-class family and had three brothers and two sisters. His family lived in Schulstraße 17, not far from today's subway station Leopoldplatz.

=== Institut für Sexualwissenschaft ===
Around 1918, when Giese was a student, he met Magnus Hirschfeld after a lecture in Munich. Later he became an employee at the Institut für Sexualwissenschaft. He took over the management of the archive of the Institute and gave lectures, curated exhibitions and wrote articles. Eventually he became Hirschfeld's life partner; Hirschfeld described their relationship as a "physical-mental connection".

During this time, Giese met the British archaeologist Francis Turville-Petre and the French author and later Nobel Prize laureate André Gide. British-American writer Christopher Isherwood, who lived for some months in the neighboring building, wrote about himself and Karl Giese:

Christopher saw in him the sturdy peasant youth with a girl’s heart, who long ago had fallen in love with Hirschfeld, his father-image. Karl still referred to Hirschfeld as "Papa".

Ellen Bækgaard, a dentist from Copenhagen and World League for Sexual Reform committee member, describes Giese in her memoirs as the "woman of the house". According to Bækgaard, Giese enjoyed decorating the place and doing needlework, as well as looking after Hirschfeld's wardrobe.

Karl Giese was interested in theater and acting. He was part of a dramatical group Theater der Eigenen. Giese also appeared in Richard Oswald's film Different from the Others as the violinist Paul Körner during his school days (Conrad Veidt played the main part of the older Körner).

When Magnus Hirschfeld traveled on world tour in 1930-31, he entrusted Giese to run the affairs of the Institute.

=== Exile in Paris ===
Hirschfeld did not return to Germany from his world journey in 1932, and Giese went to meet him in Paris. Hirschfeld was by then living with another partner, a 23-year-old Chinese medical student named Li Shiu Tong. Despite some initial jealousy, in which they nearly killed each other, they all lived together in Paris in a polyamorous ménage à trois.

After the Institut für Sexualwissenschaft in Berlin fell victim to the Nazi regime, with books from its library burned, Giese spent several months in Brno in 1933 trying to purchase surviving literature from the Institute's archives. He also made contact with the magazine Nový Hlas: List pro sexuální reformu (New Voice: Journal of Sexual Reform), arranging the publication of some articles by both Hirschfeld and himself.

=== Later years ===
In 1934 Karl Giese traveled to Paris to join Hirschfeld but was soon apprehended in a public bathhouse, arrested on charges of "public indecency", and sentenced to three months in prison. Following his imprisonment, Giese's French visa was terminated, and he was expelled from France in October 1934. Returning to Nazi Germany was out of the question, so he relocated to Vienna and lived there for one year, preparing for university admission exams. Hirschfeld and other benefactors (Bækgaard and Norman Haire) covered his living expenses and expected him to take up the study of medicine in London after completing exams in Vienna.

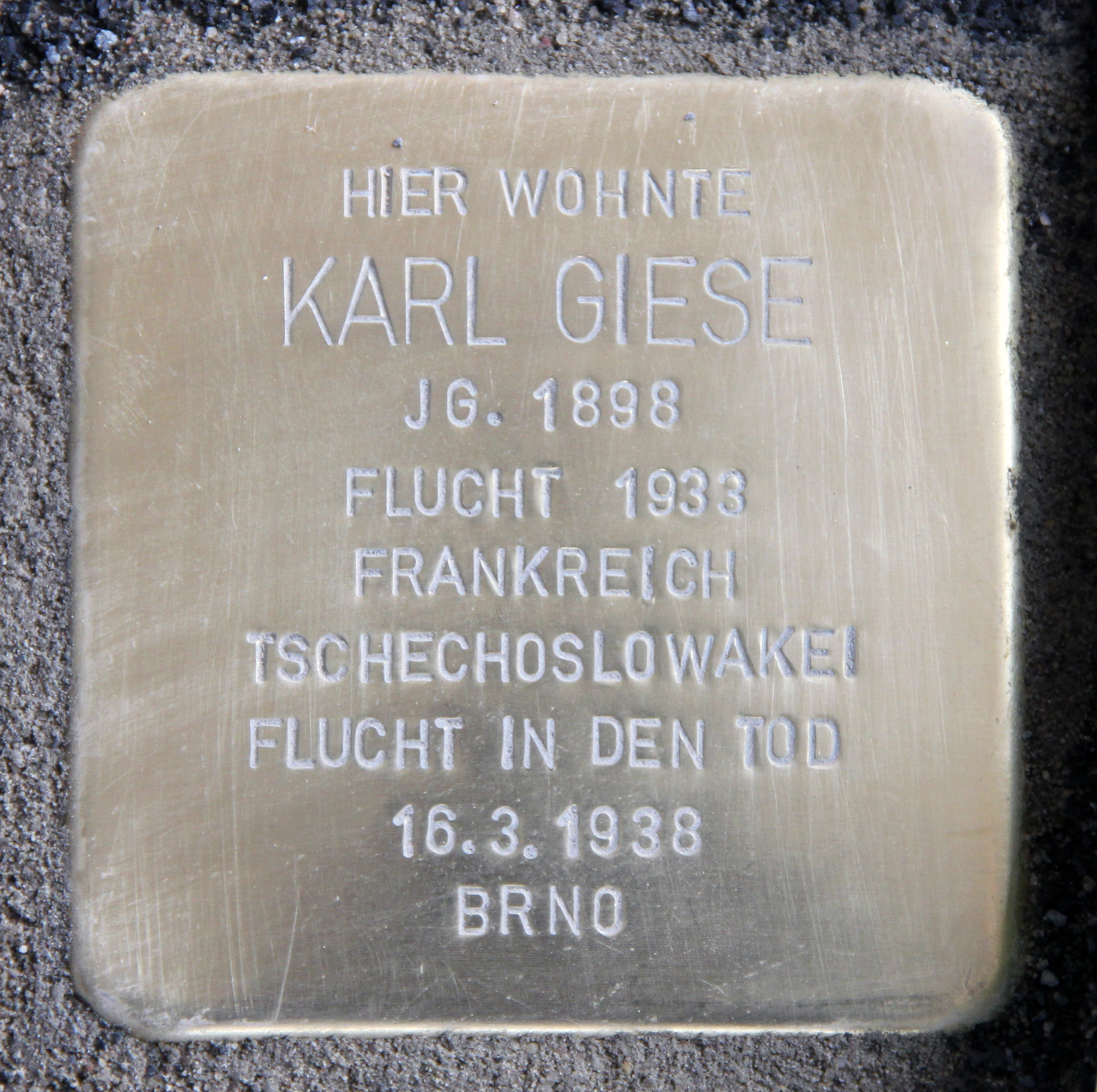
Stolperstein memorializing Giese in Berlin-Tiergarten

After Hirschfeld's death in 1935, Giese was allowed to enter France to attend Hirschfeld's funeral in Nice. Two months before his death, Hirschfeld had designated Li Shiu Tong and Karl Giese as his principal heirs, stipulating in his will that both men should use their inheritances to advance sexual science, not for personal expenses. Karl Giese was heir of the library and the few objects that had been saved from the Institute. Ultimately he was not able to use his inheritance. Norman Haire privately provided Giese with financial help in the hope that he would relocate to Britain as per Hirschfeld's wishes. However, Giese moved to Brno in 1936 and lived with the Jewish lawyer Karel Fein (1894-1942) for several months before moving into his own flat. It is known that around this time he was still in contact with the two transgender pioneers, the Jewish German-American actress Charlotte Charlaque and the German painter Toni Ebel, whom he knew from Berlin and who, like Giese, had fled to Czechoslovakia after 1933.

At the time of the Nazi annexation of Austria and shortly before the Nazi takeover of the Czech Sudetenland, Giese committed suicide in Brno on 16 March 1938. His heir, Karel Fein, was deported to the Lodz Ghetto by the Nazi regime in October 1941, and died on 2 May 1942. Giese's possessions, including his inheritance from Hirschfeld, were lost in the Holocaust.

== Other information ==
A Stolperstein memorial was placed in front of Giese's residence in Berlin-Tiergarten, at John-Foster-Dulles-Allee 10, on February 9, 2016.
