= Li Shiu Tong =

Hong Kong sexologist (1907–1993)

- 李兆堂
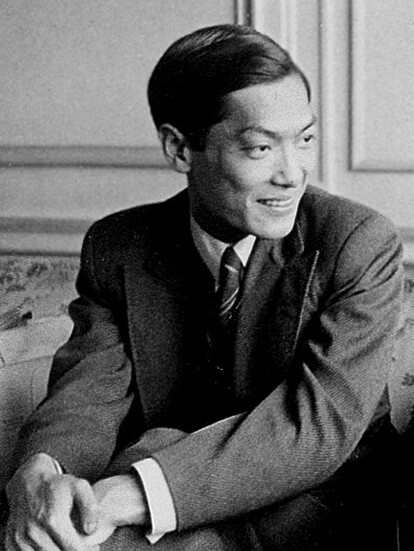
- Li at the World League for Sexual Reform, 1932
- Born: 1 September 1907; British Hong Kong
- Died: 5 October 1993 (aged 86); Vancouver, British Columbia, Canada
- Other names: Tao Li, Mann Lee
- Occupations: Student, Sexologist
- Partner: Magnus Hirschfeld

Chinese name
- Chinese: 李兆堂
Transcriptions
Standard Mandarin
- Hanyu Pinyin: Lǐ Zhàotáng
- Wade–Giles: Li^{3} Chao^{4}-tʻang^{2}
Yue: Cantonese
- Yale Romanization: Léih Siuh-tòhng
- Jyutping: Lei5 Siu6tong4

Tao Li
- Chinese: 桃李
Transcriptions
Standard Mandarin
- Hanyu Pinyin: Táolǐ
- Wade–Giles: Tʻao^{2} Li^{3}
Yue: Cantonese
- Yale Romanization: Tòuh Léih
- Jyutping: Tou4 Lei5

Li Shiu Tong (Chinese: 李兆堂; pinyin: Lǐ Zhàotáng, 1 September 1907 – 5 October 1993) was a Hong Kong medical student and sexologist. Some consider him an early LGBTQ activist. He was a companion of the German sexologist Magnus Hirschfeld.

== Early life ==
Li Shiu Tong was born in British Hong Kong on 1 September 1907 as the second son of Li Wing Kwong, a wealthy Chinese local bank owner and landlord. In 1924 the young Li went to St John's University, Shanghai, to study medicine, but dropped out without a degree. In 1931 he left Shanghai to pursue studying sexology with Magnus Hirschfeld, who served as his teacher, mentor and likely his lover.

== Early career and world tour ==
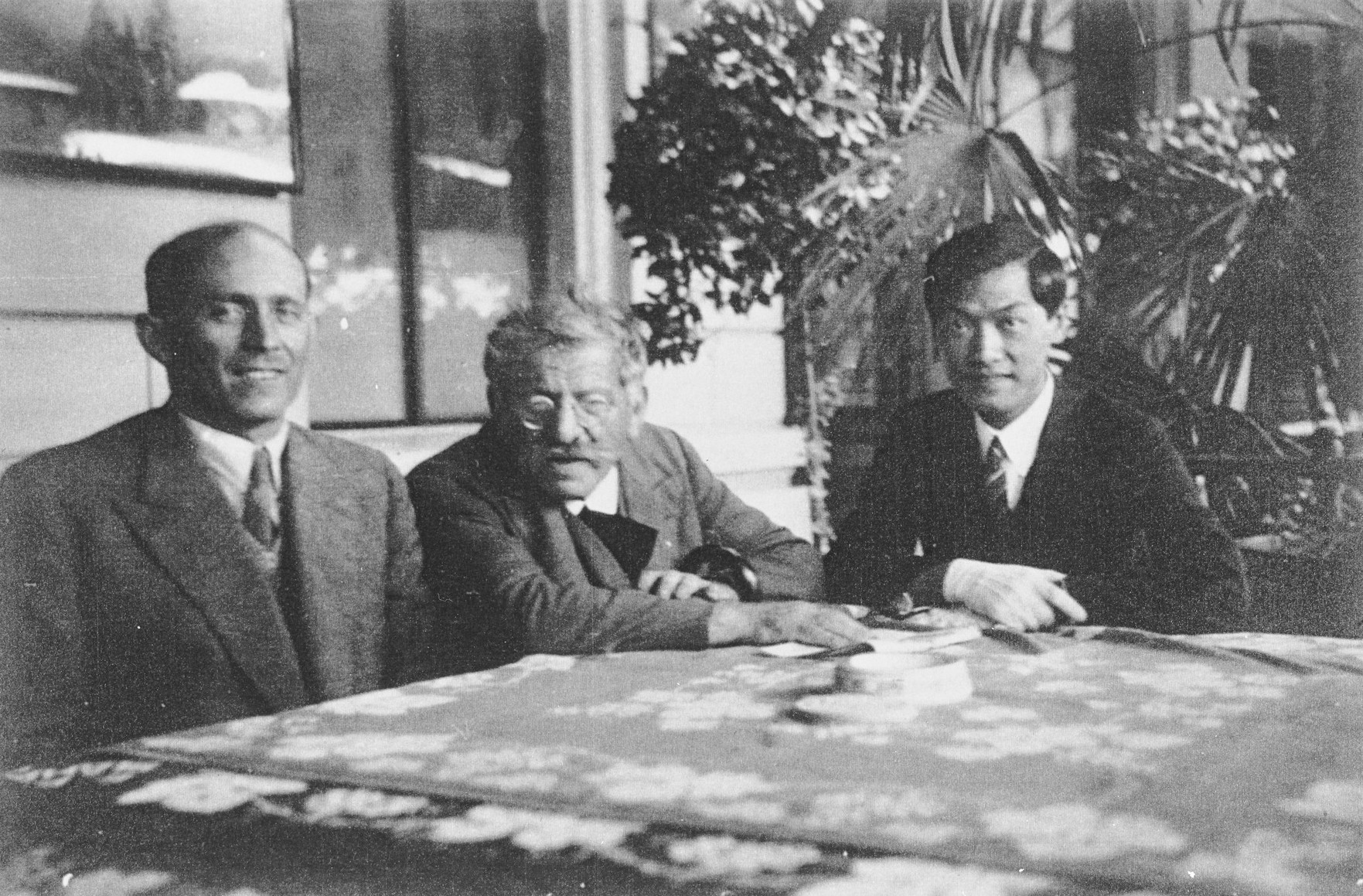
Li (right) with Bernard Schapiro and Magnus Hirschfeld, c. 1932-1934

Li met Hirschfeld in Shanghai at a public lecture for Chinese feminists at China United Apartments in 1931. Li recalled that "His lectures [were] about human sexual variation, particularly on homosexuality, a still ignorant and controversial topic." After the lecture, Li approached Hirschfeld, who claimed "[Li] offered himself to me, after my first lecture in Shanghai, as a 'companion' and 'protector', to take care of me and help me wherever I might want to travel in China, in particular to stand by my side as a Chinese interpreter." His father approved of Li accompanying Hirschfeld and hoped that his son would become "the Hirschfeld of China". Hirschfeld nicknamed him "Tao Li" (also spelled Taoli; Chinese: 桃李; lit. 'peaches and plums'; transl. upstanding pupil; also a reference to the usage of peaches as symbolism for homosexuality in Chinese culture), a name that he would be known as by others in their circles. Li accompanied Hirschfeld travelling to Beijing and Nanjing, also meeting with the Kuomintang Minister of Health to talk about "prostitution, birth control, and homosexuality". During this time, he also used the alias "Mr. Mann Lee".

Soon after, Li left Shanghai at the age of 24 in order to pursue a career with Hirschfeld, which he hoped would end with him being able to study at a European university. Li never had his political opinions explicitly expressed; however, in Hirschfeld's book about his world tour there were repeated references to the opinions of "Chinese students" on imperialism, which probably was in reference to Li. There were many instances of racism against Li throughout the world tour. For instance, Li was not allowed to leave the ship to enter American-occupied Manila until he obtained special clearance because of the Immigration Act of 1924 and the Chinese Exclusion Act of 1882. He and Hirschfeld ended up returning to Europe on 17 March 1932 in Athens. The original plan was to return to Berlin so Li could finish medical school and work at the Institut für Sexualwissenschaft, but this was derailed by the rising influence of the Nazi Party. Here they met Hirschfeld's long-time partner, Karl Giese. According to Giese, they got along well, and he described Li as "very nice and chummy to me", but an acquaintance of Hirschfeld said "He's living now with both flames (Tao and Karl). And the best part is, both of them are so jealous about the old geezer. Now if that's not true love?" It remains an open question whether the undoubtedly close relation between Li and Hirschfeld was sexual or romantic. Some, including Elena Mancini, have characterized the open sharing of love as non-monogamous.

Li and Hirschfeld spent many years in European exile, with Li acting as Hirschfeld's student, nurse and secretary. From 1932, Li was a medical student at the University of Vienna, but it is unclear whether he ever actually attended classes there. Li later claimed that he met Sigmund Freud there. With the rise of Adolf Hitler and the Nazi Party in Germany, Hirschfeld was hoping to be safe in Switzerland. In 1932 Li submitted a paper with both his and Hirschfeld's names on it to the Congress of the World League for Sexual Reform in Brno in Czechoslovakia. This paper was one of the first to cover intersex people extensively as well as the idea that homosexuality was not a disease, but rather a natural human variation influenced by disposition and environment. In May 1933, after the Nazi looting and destruction of Hirschfeld's institute in Berlin, Li helped Hirschfeld to escape from Switzerland to France. From 1933 to 1935, Hirschfeld lived, mostly together with Li, in Paris and Nice. They spent the summers 1933 and 1934 in Vichy. From November 1933 to February 1934, Li returned to Hong Kong to attend his father's and brother's funeral, who reportedly died in a car accident.

Shortly before Hirschfeld died in Nice in May 1935, Li started medical studies at the University of Zurich. Robert Hichens wrote a novel based on Li's life in the south of France and Zürich, titled That Which is Hidden, published in 1939.

== Life after Hirschfeld ==
Li and Giese were named the primary heirs in Hirschfeld's will, in which he stipulated that he would give Li an inheritance in order to carry on Hirschfeld's legacy. According to Giese, "Tao is rather panicky... Apart from the personal loss, the responsibilities that Papa has sort of imposed [quasi auferlegt] on him are a bit oppressive in light of his youth ... It is an inheritance just as honorable as it is obligatory, obligatory to the greatest possible extent, such that Tao does not even know whether he should accept it." He entered a "drifting" period after Hirschfeld's death. With little monetary limitations, he could pursue extensive travels and studies. Frightened by the Second World War, he tried to leave Switzerland. It was not before 1941 that he obtained a visa for the United States. Crossing the Atlantic from Lisbon to New York City in a refugee ship, he started studying at Harvard University. There he studied from 1941 to 1944 without actually completing a degree programme. In 1944 he moved to Washington, DC, where he became an employee of the Chinese embassy. Shortly after the end of the Second World War, he moved back to Zürich in October 1945 and resumed his medical studies at the university. He moved back to Hong Kong in 1960. In the early 1970s, he settled in Vancouver, Canada, for the final phase of his life, surrounded by more and more family members immigrating to Canada. In October 1993 he died in a hospital in Vancouver. Throughout his journeys, he kept Hirschfeld's personal items that he had inherited.

== Sexology ==
Li started his manuscript on a new theory of sexology in the 1980s, which seemed to be only partially finished at 16 pages. It also appears to have parts missing that were not retrieved from the garbage and thus presumably reside in Vancouver's Delta landfill. The manuscript is said to include Li's first book, "The Institute of S. Science in Berlin/Long introduction/Story (mixed with science) the whole book", which seems to be an account of sexological research combined with a psychological thriller about escaping Germany – partially based on Li and Hirschfeld's own escape. The book depicts Li's time evading the German authorities, who were after records of "the sexual behaviours of foreign patients" in order to gain access to blackmail material on foreign officials' sexual behaviour. Li interspersed his many post-Hirschfeld adventures with his findings. He mentions nothing of his love affair with Hirschfeld. Li wrote substantially about how he viewed gender not as absolute, but as a continuum, and argued that sexual minorities are natural. However, he broke from common beliefs with his claims that "A homosexual is not born but made" and asserted that homosexuality is nature's defence against overpopulation. He also believed that there were a lot of transgender people, who he claimed were "the most interesting mankind. A complex sexual mankind. Dr. [Hirschfeld] was the best authority on this subject. In fact he discovered it. The behavior of transvertit helped to explain some of that of the homosexual, bisexual, and even heterosexual." He also stated that queerness was far more common than people thought, claiming "humans were 40 percent bisexual, 30 percent heterosexual, 20 percent homosexual, and 10 percent other." The key factor distinguishing him from Hirschfeld was that Li did not entirely throw out the idea that queerness in sexuality and gender can be affected by environment – a departure from Hirschfeld's claims that queerness is only due to biology as a natural response to overpopulation.

== Death and legacy ==
Li died on 5 October 1993 at St Paul's Hospital, Vancouver, at the age of 86. Li's youngest brother dealt with his affairs, and many of his manuscripts and belongings ended up in a dumpster near his apartment. A neighbour recovered "an old German passport from the 1930s, black-and-white photographs, papers, a little journal filled with a scrawling hand, a few letters, many copies of a French magazine called Voilà, and... Hirschfeld's death mask." Ralf Dose, who wrote Magnus Hirschfeld: The Origins of the Gay Liberation Movement, came across a listing for the items eight years later and obtained them along with Li's books from his brother, who claimed he kept the books because Li had risked his life to save them from Nazi Germany. Most of the manuscript probably ended up in the Delta landfill.
