= Institute for Sex Research =

Institute for Sex Research may refer to:

- Kinsey Institute, an independent institution associated with Indiana University from 1947 to 2016
- Institut für Sexualwissenschaft, a research institution associated with Magnus Hirschfeld in Germany, 1919–1933
