= Different from the Others =

1919 German film

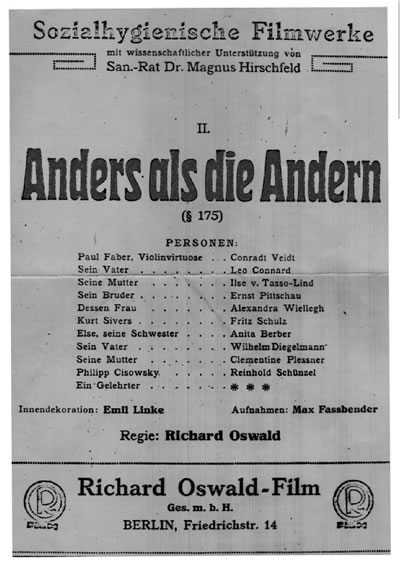
- German poster for Anders als die Andern
- Directed by: Richard Oswald
- Written by: Richard Oswald; Magnus Hirschfeld
- Produced by: Richard Oswald
- Starring: Conrad Veidt; Fritz Schulz; Reinhold Schünzel; Anita Berber; Magnus Hirschfeld; Karl Giese
- Cinematography: Max Fassbender
- Distributed by: Richard Oswald-Film Berlin
- Release date: 30 June 1919
- Running time: 50 minutes (fragment)
- Country: Weimar Republic
- Languages: Silent film; German intertitles

Different from the Others (German: Anders als die Andern) is a silent German melodramatic film produced during the Weimar Republic. It was first released in 1919 and stars Conrad Veidt and Reinhold Schünzel. It was directed by Richard Oswald, and the story co-written by Oswald and Magnus Hirschfeld, who also had a small part in the film and partially funded the production through his Institute for Sexual Science. The film was intended as a polemic against the then-current laws under Germany's Paragraph 175, which made homosexuality a criminal offense. It was one of the first sympathetic portrayals of gay men in cinema.

Censorship laws were enacted in reaction to films like Different from the Others and by October 1920 only doctors and medical researchers could view it. Prints of the film were among the many "decadent" works burned by the Nazis after they came to power in 1933.

The cinematography was by Max Fassbender, who two years previously had worked on Das Bildnis des Dorian Gray, one of the earliest cinematic treatments of Oscar Wilde's The Picture of Dorian Gray. Director Richard Oswald later became a director of more mainstream films, as did his son Gerd. Veidt became a major film star the year after Different from the Others was released, in The Cabinet of Dr. Caligari.

The film's basic plot was used again in the 1961 UK film Victim, starring Dirk Bogarde.

== Synopsis ==
Veidt portrays a successful violinist, Paul Körner, who falls in love with one of his male students. A sleazy extortionist threatens to expose Körner as a homosexual. Flashbacks show us how Körner became aware of his orientation and tried first to change it, then to understand it. Körner and the extortionist end up in court, where the judge is sympathetic to the violinist, but when the scandal becomes public, Körner's career is ruined and he is driven to suicide.

== Plot ==
The film opens with Paul Körner (Conrad Veidt), a successful violinist reading the daily newspaper obituaries, which are filled with vaguely worded and seemingly inexplicable suicides. Körner, however, knows that Paragraph 175 is hidden behind them all—that it hangs over German homosexuals "like the Sword of Damocles."

After this thesis statement, the main plot begins. Kurt Sivers (Fritz Schulz) is a fan and admirer of Körner and approaches him in hopes of becoming a student of his. Körner agrees, and they begin lessons together, during which they fall for one another.

Both men experience the disapproval of their parents. Neither are out, but Sivers' parents object to the increasingly large amount of attention he focuses on the violin and his unusual infatuation with Körner, and the Körners do not understand why he has shown no interest in finding a wife and starting a family. Körner sends his parents to see his mentor, known as just "the Doctor" (Dr. Magnus Hirschfeld).

The Doctor appears several times in the film, each time to deliver speeches more intended for the audience than the advancement of the plot. In this, his first appearance, he tells Körner's parents:

You must not condemn your son because he is a homosexual, he is not to blame for his orientation. It is not wrong, nor should it be a crime. Indeed, it is not even an illness, merely a variation, and one that is common to all of nature.

After Körner's coming out, he and Sivers begin seeing each other more openly. While walking together, hand in hand, through the park, they pass a man, Franz Bollek (Reinhold Schünzel), who recognizes Körner. Later that day, when Körner is alone, Bollek confronts him and demands hush money or else he will expose Sivers.

Körner pays him and keeps it a secret from Sivers that he does so. Eventually, however, the blackmailer's demands become too great and Körner refuses to pay (Bollek reads Körner's reply to his demand in a gay bar). Bollek decides instead to break into Körner's house while he and Sivers are performing, but he is discovered by Sivers and Körner on their return and a fight breaks out. In the course of the fight, Bollek reveals to Sivers that he has been blackmailing him.

Sivers runs away and faces hardships trying to survive alone. Körner is left dejected and, over a photo of Sivers, remembers his past.

His first memory is of boarding school, when he and his boyfriend Max are discovered kissing by their teacher and he is expelled. Next, he remembers University and his solitary and lonely life there, and the growing impossibility of trying to play straight.

Körner first meets with the doctor.

He remembers trying an ex-gay hypnotherapist, but finding him only to be a charlatan. Then he first met the Doctor, whose reaction was much different from those he had previously met. Among other things, he told him:

Love for one of the same sex is no less pure or noble than for one of the opposite. This orientation can be found in all levels of society, and among respected people. Those that say otherwise come only from ignorance and bigotry.

Remembering further, he recalled first meeting Bollek at a gay dance hall, and Bollek leading him on before ultimately turning on him and using his homosexuality to blackmail him.

Back in the present, Körner takes Else Sivers (Anita Berber), Kurt Sivers' sister, to the Doctor's lecture on alternative sexuality. The Doctor speaks on topics such as homosexuality, lesbianism, gender identity, intersexuality, the perils of stereotypes, and the idea that sexuality is physically determined, rather than a mental condition. Enlightened by the presentation, Else renounces her wish for a relationship with Körner and instead pledges her friendship and support.

Körner reports Bollek for blackmail and has him arrested. In retaliation, Bollek exposes Körner. The Doctor gives testimony on Körner's behalf, but both are found guilty of their respective crimes. Bollek is sentenced to three years for extortion. The judge is sympathetic to Körner, and gives him the minimum sentence allowable: one week.

Allowed to go home before starting his term, Körner finds himself shunned by friends and strangers alike, and no longer employable. Even his family tells him there is only one honorable way out. He then takes a handful of pills, committing suicide.

Sivers rushes to his side as he lies dead. Körner's parents blame Sivers for what has happened, but Else harshly rebukes them. Meanwhile, Sivers attempts to kill himself as well, but the Doctor prevents him and delivers his final speech:

You have to keep living; live to change the prejudices by which this man has been made one of the countless victims. ... [Y]ou must restore the honor of this man and bring justice to him, and all those who came before him, and all those to come after him. Justice through knowledge!

The film closes with an open German law book, turned to Paragraph 175, as a hand holding a brush crosses it out.

== Cast ==
- Conrad Veidt as Paul Körner
- Leo Connard as Körner's Father
- Ilse von Tasso-Lind as Körner's Sister
- Alexandra Willegh as Körner's Mother
- Ernst Pittschau as Sister's Husband
- Fritz Schulz as Kurt Sivers
- Wilhelm Diegelmann as Sivers' Father
- Clementine Plessner as Sivers' Mother
- Anita Berber as Else
- Reinhold Schünzel as Franz Bollek
- Helga Molander as Mrs. Hellborn
- Magnus Hirschfeld as Doctor
- Karl Giese as Young Paul Körner

== Background ==
The film arose in a time where there was no national film censorship in Germany.

The film was premiered on May 28, 1919, in a special performance at the Berlin Apollo-Theater and then on May 30, 1919, at the Prinzeß-Theater. The film started out with 40 prints, which was a high number for the time and was initially successful. It was classified as an Aufklärungsfilm, or "sexual enlightenment film", in Germany. This film was also the first film that openly portrayed homosexuality.

Magnus Hirschfeld also filmed a documentary film entitled Laws of Love (Gesetze der Liebe) in 1927, which used a shortened version of the film Different from the Others to discuss the subject of homosexuality. Shortly after it was released, Laws of Love also fell to censorship laws, but not before a copy made its way to Ukraine, where it was subtitled in the local language. This version of Laws of Love was discovered by the city museum of Munich in the 1970s.

A new censorship program was created in response to the film in May 1920, and the film was banned except for private educational showings in August 1920.

The original version of the film is no longer preserved, as the film copies were banned and destroyed. Because of this, large parts of the film were lost beyond recall. The current versions of the film were reconstructed from the shortened version of the film in Laws of Love. The Munich Film Museum has a restored version of the film, which was first released on VHS as a silent film with German intertitles. Since October 2006, a DVD edition from the Munich Film Museum has been available in both German and English. This DVD version also includes a short documentary about the history of censorship and a section of Laws of Love.

== Reception ==
This film, along with other moral and sexual enlightenment films, incited a cultural debate in Germany. Shortly after the premiere, conservative Catholic, Protestant, and antisemitic groups started to protest and disturb the public screenings. Conservative and reactionary sides called for a reintroduction of censorship policy, claiming that they wanted to protect young people. Some people also reacted to the film with antisemitism, which was seen in a range of publications including strict conservative pages and the gay journals of Friedrich Radszuweit-Verlag. It was claimed that Hirschfeld and Oswald, who were both Jews, were promoting the Jewish vice of homosexuality.

In response to this controversy, censorship laws for cinema were re-launched in the Weimar Republic. These new film censorship laws were entitled the Reichslichtspielgesetz (Reich Cinema Act), and they were reinstated on May 12, 1920. The censorship commission consisted of three psychiatrists: Emil Kraepelin, Albert Moll, and Siegfried Placzek, all of whom were opponents of Hirschfeld and his advocacy of the legalization of homosexuality. Different from the Others was outlawed on August 18, 1920, that same year. This was the new censorship panel's first review.

The judgment was that the film was biased against Paragraph 175 and thus presents a one-sided view, confuses young audiences about homosexuality, and can be used for the recruitment of underage viewers to become homosexuals. The film was banned in several cities, including Munich and Stuttgart. Many copies of the film were destroyed after the film was banned and performances were restricted, only being allowed to be shown to preapproved groups such as doctors and other medical professionals in educational and scientific institutions. At the end, the only venue where the film was screened for public viewing was the Institute for Sexual Science, where it was shown for education and at special events.

== Reviews ==
Contemporary comments mirror the controversy that Different from the Others sparked. On August 18, 1919, B.Z. am Mittag, after a private showing of the film, said it was an antisemitic propaganda vehicle. However, there was a consensus among those invited that the film's story did not seem indecent or immoral. Those invited to this private showing included scientists, government officials, and writers.

Curt Moreck, in his book, Moral Stories of Cinema (Sittengeschichte des Kinos), commented against the film in 1926. Looking back on the banned film, this criticism was on the grounds that the manufacturer of the film had sensed the deal: "Even within the circles of the cinema industry itself, protests were loud, and public opinion arose in a chorus of many voices against the danger of making perverse forms of sexual behaviour to be the content of films about sexual enlightenment." („Allein selbst in den Kreisen der Kinoindustrie wurden Proteste laut, und die öffentliche Meinung wandte sich mit einem vielstimmigen Chor gegen das Wagnis, perverse Erscheinungen des Sexuallebens zum Inhalt von Aufklärungsfilmen zu machen.“)

The Encyclopedia of International Films (Lexikon des internationalen Films) saw Oswald's work completely positively: "This exemplary intimate play, the first German film about homosexuality, avoids every cliché and shimmers with outstanding performances" („Das beispielhafte Kammerspiel, der erste deutsche film über Homosexualität, vermeidet jedes Klischee und glänzt mit exzellenten Darstellerleistungen.“)

== Other Information ==
The film, which co-starred and was co-written by sexologist Magnus Hirschfeld, refers to Hirschfeld's theory of "sexual intermediacy". The theory places homosexuality within a broad spectrum comprising heterosexuality, bisexuality, transgenderism, and transvestism (a word invented by Hirschfeld). The film's protagonist first meets his blackmailer at a costume party, and the blackmailer also frequents a drag club; these scenes are the earliest film footage of gay men and women dancing. The film was initially shipped in 40 copies throughout Germany and the Netherlands by Oswald, and it was shown for nearly a year before the authorities stepped in and banned public screenings, allowing it to be shown only to doctors and lawyers. The Nazis destroyed the majority of the prints and only one copy of the film is known to exist.

UCLA Film and Television Archive purchased an original fine-grain master positive of the film's footage, which Hirschfeld inserted in his own film Laws of Love, from the Russian State Film and Photo Archive.

The early gay anthem Das lila Lied from 1920 appears to reference the film's title at the start of its chorus („Wir sind nun einmal anders als die Andern“).

== Modern Screenings ==
The film was screened as part of the official program at Outfest in 2012. To celebrate the 30th anniversary of the Teddy Awards, the film was selected for the 66th Berlin International Film Festival in February 2016. The New York LGBT film festival NewFest screened Different from the Others in October 2016. A special event screening at Jerusalem Cinematheque followed in June 2017.

== See also ==
- List of films made in Weimar Germany
- List of lesbian, gay, bisexual or transgender-related films
- List of partially lost films
