= Cache Creek landfill =

Canadian Landfill

Coordinates: 50.7878°N 121.3168°W

The Cache Creek landfill is a closed landfill in British Columbia, Canada. In 1989, Cache Creek became a landfill site for garbage shipped by truck from the Lower Mainland. It closed in 2016 and was replaced by the adjacent Campbell Hill landfill in 2019, where it started accepting solid waste from the Thompson-Nicola Regional District.

== History ==
On January 6, 2010, the Ministry of Environment approved a 42-hectare extension of the existing Cache Creek landfill, providing an additional 12.6 million tonnes of disposal capacity. This project was expected to have a lifespan of 25 years or more, depending on increasing rates of material recovery through composting and recycling. The extension is now known as the Campbell Hill landfill.

The Cache Creek landfill received 500,000 tonnes of waste from Metro Vancouver municipalities in 2007, declining to 130,000 tonnes in 2016. Metro Vancouver stopped sending waste to the landfill in 2016 after the expiry of their contingency disposal contract with Cache Creek.

== See also ==
- Delta landfill
