= Eugen Steinach =

Austrian physiologist and endocrinologist (1866–1944)

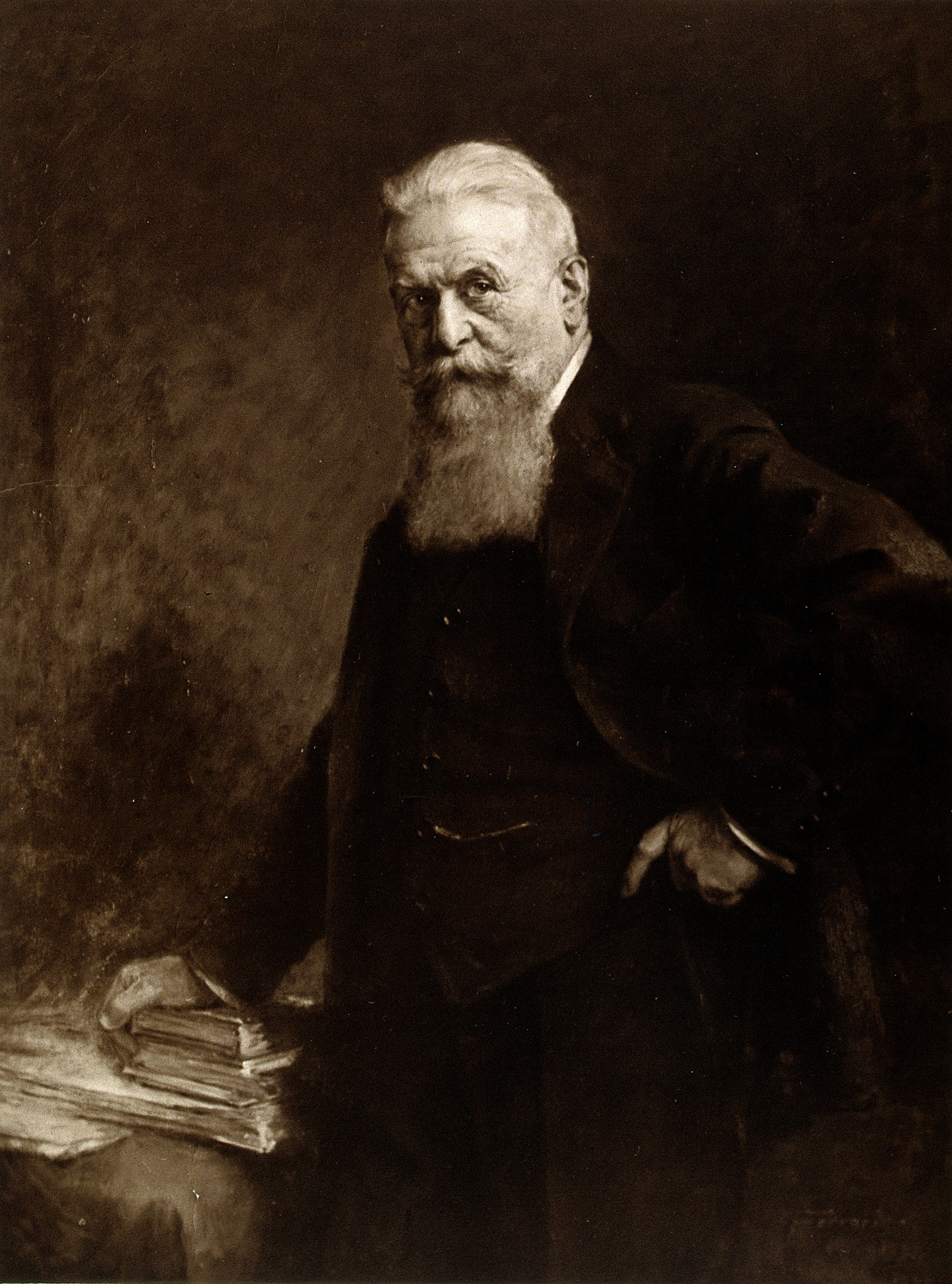
- Photograph by J. Scherb after a painting
- Born: 28 January 1861; Hohenems, County of Tyrol, Austrian Empire
- Died: 14 May 1944 (aged 83); Switzerland
- Occupations: Physiologist, endocrinologist
- Known for: Role in discovering the relationship between sex hormones (estrogen and testosterone) and human physical identifiers
- Medical career
- Field: Endocrinology, sexology

Eugen Steinach (28 January 1861 – 14 May 1944) was an Austrian physiologist and pioneer in endocrinology. Steinach played a significant role in discovering the relationship between sex hormones (estrogen and testosterone) and human physical identifiers.

== Life and career ==
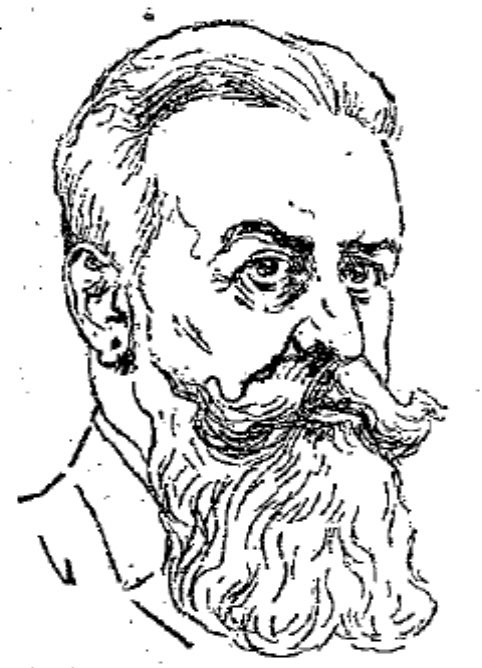
Eugen Steinach.

Steinach was born on 28 January 1861, in Hohenems, County of Tyrol, Austrian Empire. His family were well-off and had been prominent in Jewish affairs in Hohenems for several generations. His father and his grandfather were both physicians; his father studied under Ernst Wilhelm von Brücke, a leading German physiologist.

Steinach was a physiologist, hormone researcher and biology professor who became the Director of Vienna's Biological Institute of the Academy of Sciences in 1912, the year in which he conducted experiments in the transplantation of a male guinea pig's testes into a female and the castration of the male. The testes secretion, now known as testosterone, resulted in the female guinea pig developing male sexual behaviour such as mounting the partner. This led Steinach to theorize that the gland's secretions were responsible for sexuality.

After World War I, Steinach attempted to change the sexual orientation of a homosexual man by transplanting into his groin one half of an undescended testicle that Steinach had removed from a heterosexual man. In 1923 he commissioned a film on this work.

He developed the "Steinach operation," or "Steinach vasoligature," the goals of which were to reduce fatigue and the consequences of ageing and to increase overall vigor and sexual potency in men. It consisted of a half-(unilateral) vasectomy, which Steinach theorized would shift the balance from sperm production toward increased hormone production in the affected testicle.

Famous Steinach surgeons in the 1920s and 1930s included Victor Blum, Robert Lichtenstern and Norman Haire. Steinach's friend Harry Benjamin practiced it in the United States until the early 1930s.

The procedure was later discredited, but even at the peak of its popularity there were medical sceptics such as Morris Fishbein, who edited the Journal of the American Medical Association and in 1927 likened rejuvenation cures to finding gold: once the ‘cry of “gold, gold” was taken up by Steinach enthusiasts and famous actors, doctors and financiers had the operations, the newspapers reported their good news stories and there was an additional rush of applicants. Gertrude Atherton's 1922 novel Black Oxen involves a fictional endocrine treatment attributed in the novel to Steinach. William Butler Yeats had an outburst of lyrical poetry and a 'second puberty' after Haire 'Steinached' him on 6 April 1934.

Steinach received six nominations for the Nobel Prize in Physiology from 1921 to 1938, although he never received the prize.

Steinach worked with sexologist Magnus Hirschfeld on developing what would eventually become transgender surgery. Steinach's experimental role in identifying the relationship between sex hormones (estrogen and testosterone) and human physical identifiers had major consequences for gender reassignment surgery and hormone replacement therapy. Indeed, this experimental science was then in its infancy in Vienna and developed over a period of 20 years with incomplete human experimentation, before two members of Hirschfeld's Institut für Sexualwissenschaft (Ludwig Levy-Lenz and Felix Abraham) carried out the first complete male-to-female gender reassignment surgery on a German subject, Dora Richter in 1931.

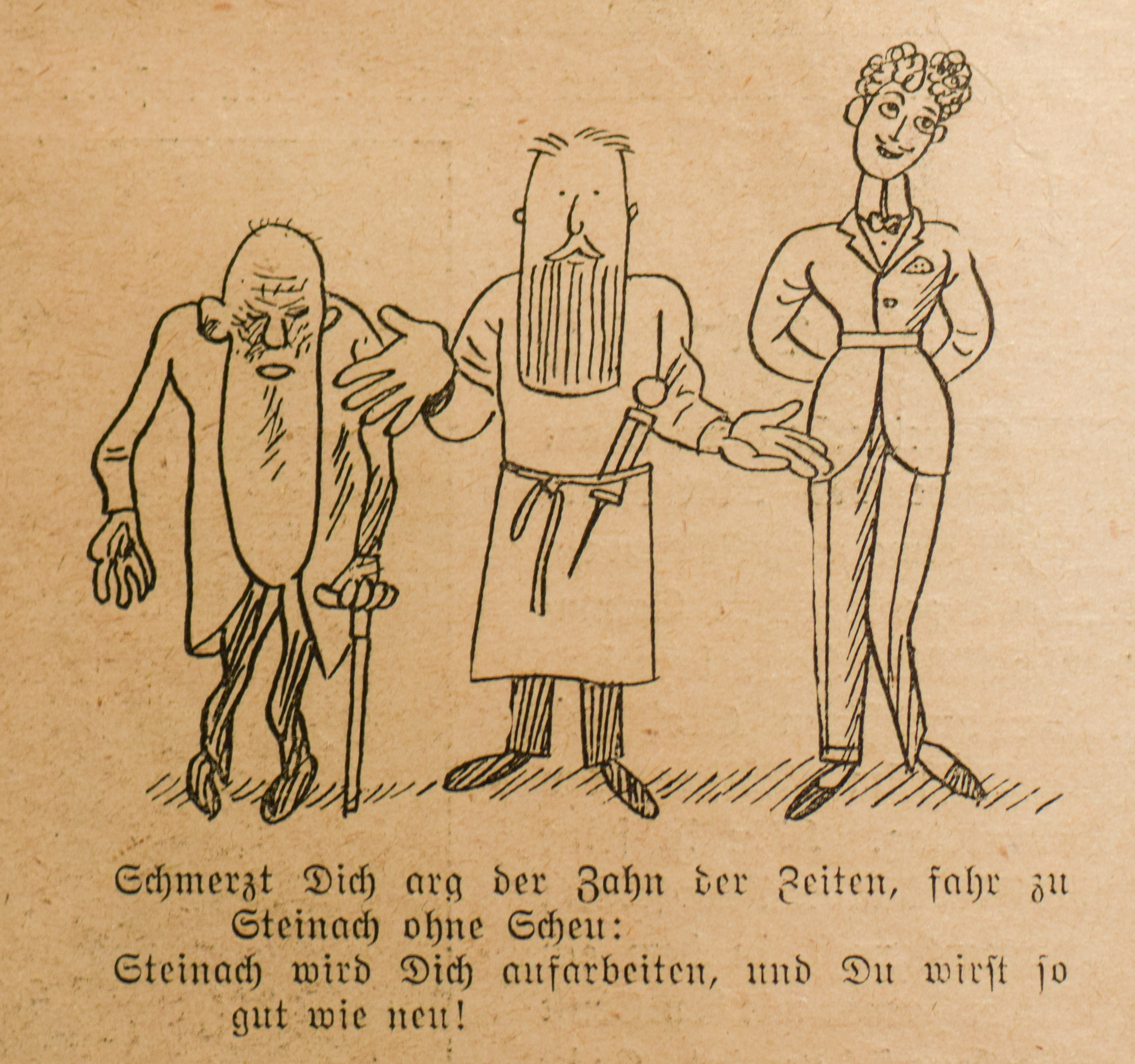
1920 cartoon about Eugen Steinach

He died on 14 May 1944, during exile in Switzerland. Harry Benjamin, in a June 1944 obituary for his colleague, attributed the melancholy of his final years to his enforced exile in Zürich and the ‘unjust criticism’ of his rejuvenations and emphasised the ‘enormous impetus’ his work had for biochemists to concern themselves with all the endocrine glands.

== In popular culture ==
Aldous Huxley's 1923 book Antic Hay makes mention of "a fifteen-year-old monkey, rejuvenated by the Steinach process."

== See also ==
- Serge Voronoff
