= Mugharet el-Zuttiyeh =

Archaeological site in Israel

Zuttiyeh Cave
- Mugharet el-Zuttiyeh
- Cave of the Robbers
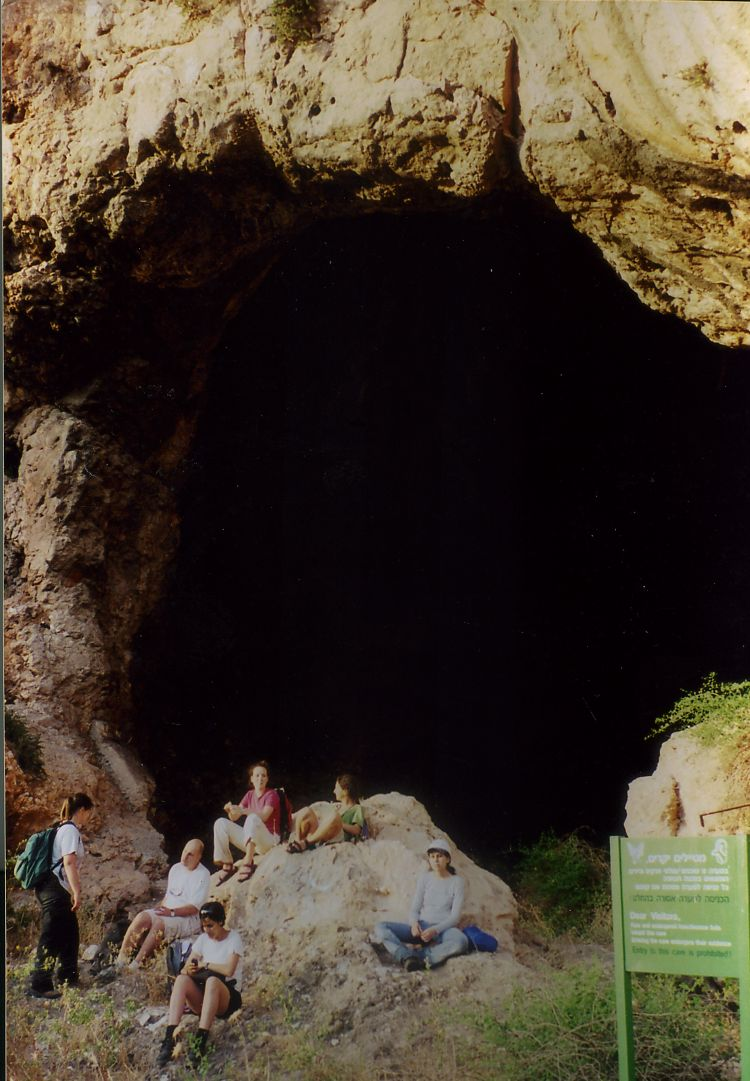
- Entrance to Zuttiyeh Cave, Galilee

- 32.866173°N 35.505728°E
- Type: limestone cave
- Cultures: Acheulo-Yabrudian complex
- Associated with: Homo heidelbergensis
- Region: Upper Galilee, Israel

Site notes
- Archaeologists: Francis Turville-Petre

Mugharet el-Zuttiyeh ("Cave of the Robbers"), also called as the "Skull Cave", is a prehistoric archaeological site in Upper Galilee, Israel. It is situated 2,900 m (9,500 ft) from the Nahal Amud outlet, approximately 30 m (98 ft) above the wadi bed (148 m (486 ft) below sea level). It was found to house a fossil today known as the "Galilee skull" or "The Yabrudian Man".

== History ==
Discovered in 1925, the skull was the first fossilised archaic human found in Western Asia. Together with the remains found at Es Skhul and the Wadi el-Mughara Caves, this find was classified in 1939 by Arthur Keith and Theodore D. McCown as Palaeoanthropus palestinensis. Today its taxonomy is that of Homo heidelbergensis.

Zuttiyeh cave is at the opening of a limestone ravine where Nahal Amud turns eastward, 250 m (820 ft) above a smaller cave known as Mugharet el-Emireh (Cave of the Princess).

The cave was excavated from 1925 to 1926 by Francis Turville-Petre. It was the first paleontological excavation in the region. Turville-Petre discovered a skull, referred to as the Galilee Skull, that was initially described as the second Neanderthal-like specimen. It was originally attributed to a Mousterian stratum and is now thought to be from an earlier Acheulo-Yabrudian complex. Later studies showed that the face was relatively flat, with no evidence of Neanderthal-like facial prognathism.

The frontal bone and part of the upper face were found in the Mugharan level, which leads to an estimate of the age of the fossil to range from 200 to 500 kya. Similarities with Zhoukoudian remains suggest a possible ancestral relationship.

The skull is housed in the Rockefeller Museum in East Jerusalem along with many other findings of Turville-Petre. A cast of the skull is on display at the Israel Museum.

== Gallery ==
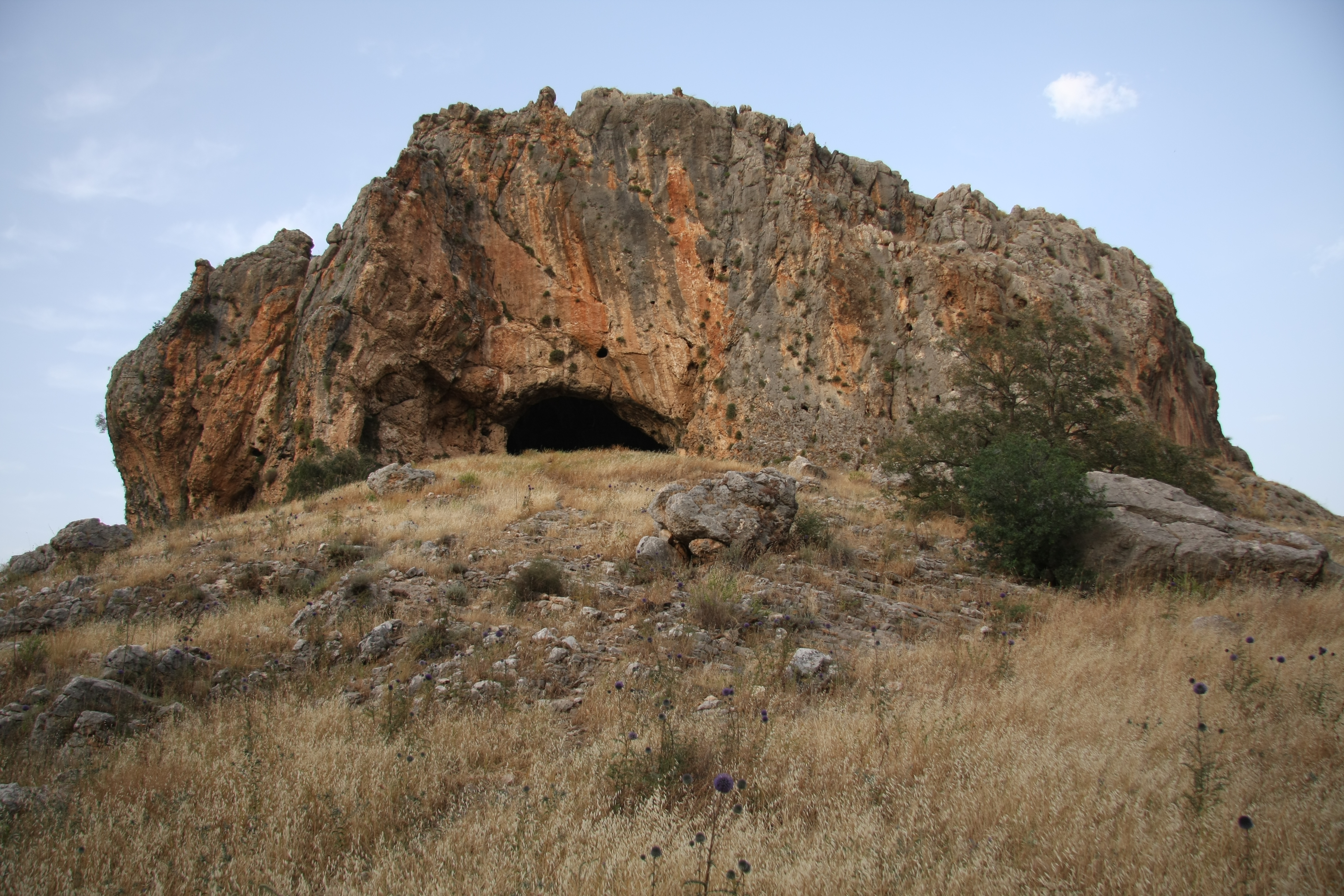
Hill of the Mugharet el-Zuttiyeh cave

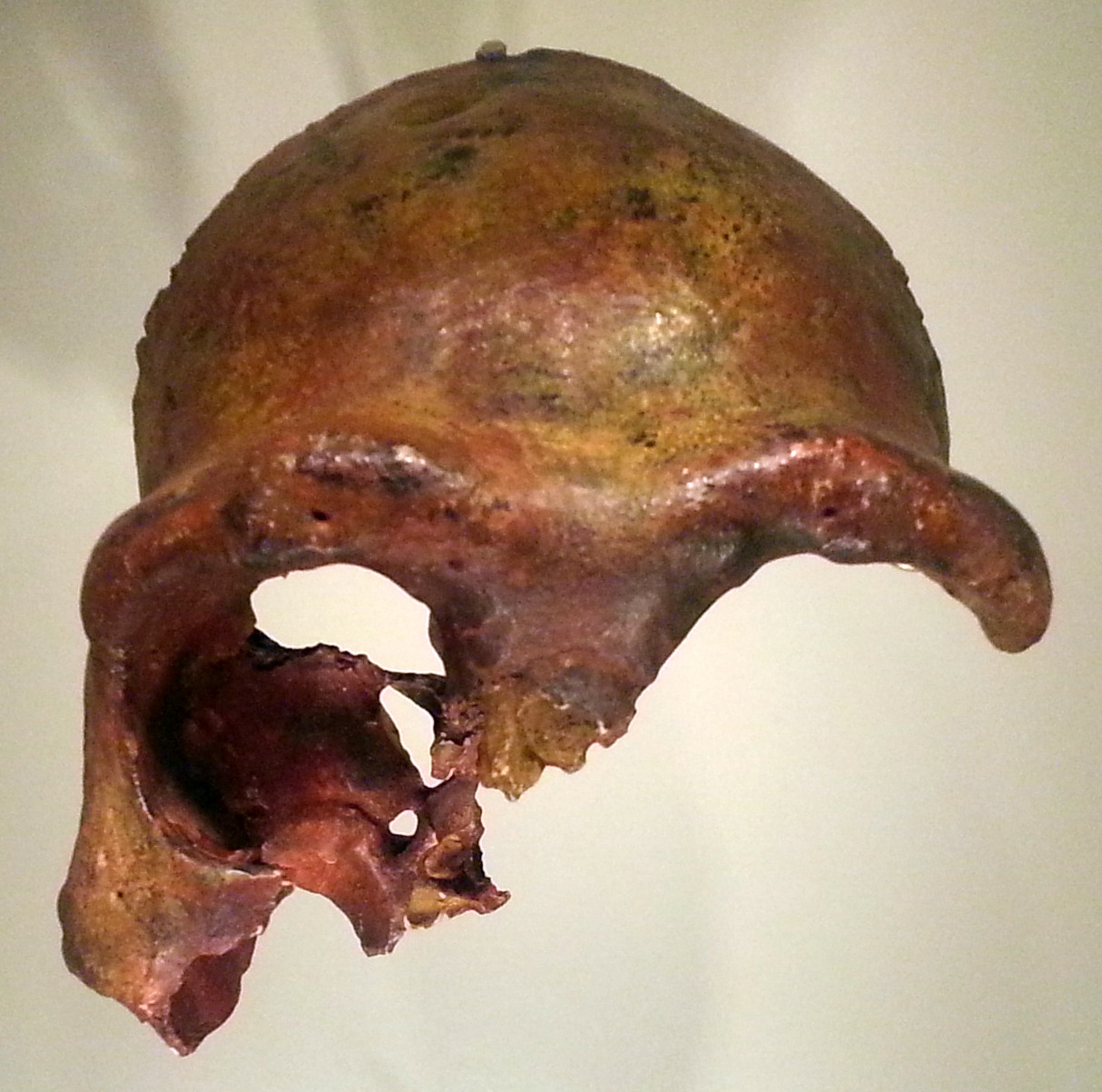
A cast of the Galilee skull, Israel Museum

== See also ==
- Archaeology of Israel
- List of human evolution fossils
- Qesem Cave
- Skhul and Qafzeh hominids
