= Norman Haire =

Australian sexologist and birth control pioneer (1892–1952)

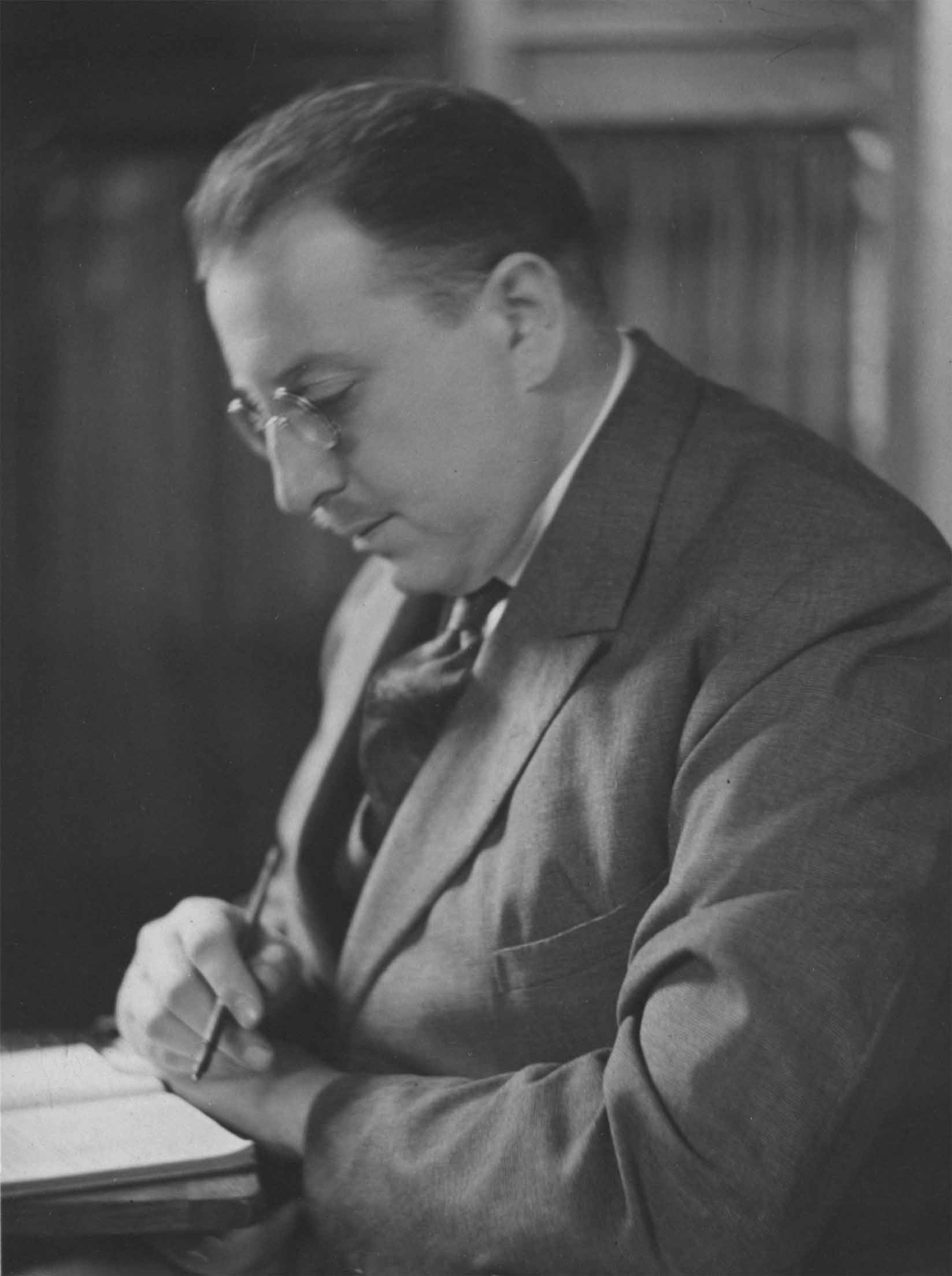
Norman Haire, early 1940s

Norman Haire, born Norman Zions (21 January 1892, Sydney – 11 September 1952, London) was an Australian medical practitioner and sexologist. He has been called "the most prominent sexologist in Britain" between the wars.

== Life ==
When Norman was born in 1892 his parents, Henry and Clara Zions, were living in Sydney at 255 Oxford Street, Paddington. He was their unplanned and unwanted, 11th and final child. He was a star debater at Fort Street High School but his plans to be an actor were thwarted when his parents made him study medicine. He was anxious about his sexuality as a teenager (i.e., he was homosexual), but his chance discovery of Havelock Ellis' Studies in the Psychology of Sex in Sydney's public library made him decide that he, like Ellis, would devote his life to saving people from sexual misery. He graduated in 1915 from the University of Sydney, and worked in several obstetric and mental health hospitals before his appointment as Medical Superintendent at Newcastle Hospital at the time of the influenza pandemic. When a patient died, Zions was unjustly held responsible and, shortly after, left his homeland for twenty years.

After arriving in London he changed his name to Norman Haire in December 1919 and, five years later, his status as a poor, Jewish outsider had changed to that of a celebrity with a flourishing gynaecological practice in Harley Street, a chauffeur-driven Rolls-Royce and a country house. He was a feeling, thinking and doing man, equal parts hedonist and humanist; a tall, fat and flamboyant rationalist who was secretly homosexual and said blunt things in a beautiful voice. He sought out Havelock Ellis who introduced him to key people in the fields of eugenics and sexual reform, including birth control pioneers Margaret Sanger, Marie Stopes and Charles and Bessie Drysdale from the Malthusian League. In 1921 Haire became the chief honorary medical officer at their free birth-control clinic – the Walworth Women's Welfare Centre in East London. In 1923, with a letter of introduction from Ellis, Haire travelled to Berlin to meet Magnus Hirschfeld (a Jewish, openly gay, socialist sexologist) and visited his Institut für Sexualwissenschaft (Institute for Sexual Research). In 1923 he became a fêted speaker at a Cambridge University prestigious society called The Heretics. Five years later Haire captivated the audience at Oxford University when he became the St John's Essay Society's most illustrious speaker. They were dazzled by Haire whose three-hour and comprehensive exposition received 'intensive and appreciative attention' from an audience that was the largest in the Society's records.

People flocked to Haire's lectures and eagerly bought his informative books about birth control and sexology. In 1922 he took a leading role in the world's first international conference on birth control which was held in London and he also starred in conferences in lecture tours in American and in Germany, France and Spain and he lectured fluently in German, French and Spanish. He was one of the first to provide the poor with birth control clinics and he convinced Britain's medical profession of the need to learn about contraception and provide it.

Haire managed to combine his medical and theatrical talents and played a small part when Ivor Montagu directed a cast of his friends in a 1928 silent slapstick movie called Blue Bottles (British slang for police) which used innovative special effects. The stars were Charles Laughton and Elsa Lanchester and it was adapted from a story by H. G. Wells. Haire was a superb administrator and with Dora Russell he organised the World League for Sexual Reform's highly successful 1929 congress in London which many of the world's avant-garde attended. By 1930 he was so famous that the society author Ethel Mannin commented 'The correct answer to 'Do you know who Norman Haire is? is 'Oh, good Lord, who doesn't'. However, as the Nazis rose to power in Germany Magnus Hirschfeld fled into exile and, after confiscating Marxist, communist, pacifist, Jewish and other 'un-German' books from libraries and private owners, Goebbels officiated at the 10 May 1933 Nazi book burnings in Berlin's Opera Place. Stormtroopers and Nazi youths burnt about 20,000 books (including some written by Haire) from Hirschfeld's Institute for Sexual Research.

Satisfying people who yearned for longevity made Haire rich. The 'rejuvenation' craze appealed mostly to men and it was really only a vasectomy (women had their ovaries irradiated) but, until the medical claims were refuted, hopeful patients paid high fees to revitalise their sex lives or defer senility. Having popularised the Steinach rejuvenation operation throughout the 1920s, within nine years he had Steinached 'rather less than 200' artistic and intellectual men including W. B. Yeats in 1934.

In the 1930s Haire's heart was weakened by rheumatic fever. In addition he became diabetic and was incapitated so severely that he was granted an invalid permit to leave Britain during World War II. He returned to Australia, expecting to die or be an invalid but once he began using insulin he was able to resume his medical work in Macquarie Street, Sydney.

In 1941 he began writing a weekly advice column under the pen name 'Dr Wykeham Terriss' for the Australian magazine Woman. He continued to do so for a decade despite strong opposition by the Catholic Church. The poet and journalist Elizabeth Riddell, in an interview given during her 80s, spoke affectionately about her time on the editorial staff of Woman in the 1940s; she said that she and Haire were 'honest with each other and got along well'. Editor, columnist and ex-parliamentarian Peter Coleman called Haire 'one of Australia's most famous free thinkers and sex reformers' and said the column in Woman was 'probably the most free-thinking series of articles ever written for a mass circulation magazine'. Haire was the key speaker in an ABC radio debate 'Population Unlimited?' in 1944 but was hounded by the security service which suspected him of being 'a secret communist'. Following this debate, politicians denounced him in parliament and behind the scenes their sabotage attempts segued into a dramatic court case on 22 March 1945. The Sydney Morning Herald reported on 4 April that Haire had been charged with assaulting a patient with her 'red handbag.' Haire gave a list of his opponents to his lawyers but, amazingly, he did not believe the woman's charges were part of a 'premeditated plot' but said that, once his enemies and Ezra Norton's scandal sheet Truth found out, 'they decided to exploit it, and encouraged her to make the most of it'. Four days before he was charged, The Sydney Morning Herald noted on 25 April that Haire had withdrawn from rehearsals for his much-acclaimed role as Sir Ralph Bonnington-Bloomfield at the Independent Theatre. Woman remained supportive and he continued with the articles. He even wrote about abortion and said he had received 1000 abortion requests from Australian women between 1940 and 1946. When some of the readers accused him of being an abortion provider, he wrote on 6 August 1945 that he had 'learned to ignore such scurrilous abuse' although he worried others might be bored by his frequent warnings. This was a brave stance when Australian newspapers refused to print the word "abortion" and substituted euphemisms such "an illegal operation" or "bringing on the periods".

He returned to London in 1946 and during most of his final years in Britain he bravely persevered in his quest to fine tune sexual morality so that individuals and communities could live as harmoniously as possible. The World League for Sexual Reform was disbanded in 1935 so after World War II he established and became president of the Sexual Reform Society and published The Journal of Sex Education to rekindle the campaign for sexual reform. History professor Nicholas Edsall wrote: 'More than anyone else it was [Haire] who had kept the issue of [homo-]sexual reform alive, though only barely, through the lean years of the 1930s and the post-war years in Britain. There were no organisations in Britain comparable to the Mattachine Society in the United States, Arcadie in France, or even the International Society for Human Rights in Germany, let alone the Dutch COC' – the Dutch Society for Sexual Reform. 'The last, tenuous link with the British Society for the Study of Sex Psychology 'was broken when 'its post-war successor, the Sex Education Society, died following the death of Norman Haire'.

In 1952, on a lecture tour of the United States, he suffered a heart attack and was forced to return to London where he died at the age of 60. On 31 October 1952 The Times advertised the sale of Haire's house at 127 Harley Street and published this Wills and Bequest Notice on 10 December: 'Dr Norman Haire of Harley Street, W and Sydney, Australia, left an estate in England valued at £31,365 (duty paid £2886). He left a bequest to his lifelong companion Willem Van de Haght (the former administrator of the Rotterdam Zoo) and left the library of books and other publications to the University of Sydney, and, after other legacies and bequests, the residue of his property to the university directing that it be paid to the Vice-Chancellor to be applied in such manner as the Senate of the university determines for the study of sexology.' Haire's executors (his solicitor Philip Kimber and Lloyds Bank Ltd) felt it was in the public interest to ignore his will and destroy his papers. They decided that since he was a sexologist and there was correspondence from a number of distinguished persons which might have caused embarrassment if it fell into the wrong hands, they would burn everything and did so. They also burnt the Sex Education Society's records. Fortunately, much of the information has survived because he was a famous lecturer and author who mixed with famous and influential people, many of whom recorded their impressions of him. The contribution this tenacious, humane, innovative and brave man made to birth control, sexology and human rights history are celebrated in his biography.

Haire told 'Paddy' O'Connor that he had decided to leave his money to the University of Sydney for the study of sex "to annoy the wowsers".

Haire's papers are held at the University of Sydney Library.

== Works ==
- Hygienic methods of family limitation, London: The Malthusian League, [1922?]
- Rejuvenation: the work of Steinach, Voronoff, and others, London: G. Allen & Unwin Ltd, 1924
- Hymen, or the future of marriage, London: Paul, Trench, Trubner, 1927.
- (tr. with E. S. Jerdan) Woman and love. Vol. 2, A treatise on the anatomy, physiology, psychology and sexual life of woman with an appendix on prostitution by Bernhard A. Bauer. New York: Boni & Liveright, 1927. Translated from the German Wie bist du, weib
- (ed.) Some more medical views on birth control, New York: E.P. Dutton & Co., [1928].
- 'Rejuvenation'. The Realist: A New Journal of Scientific Humanism, May 1929, pp. 120–129.
- (ed.) Love-life in nature; the story of the evolution of love by Wilhelm Bölsche. Translated from the German by Cyril Brown. London: J. Cape, [1931]
- Introduction to Man into Woman: An Authentic Record of a Change of Sex; The true story of the miraculous transformation of the Danish painter Einar Wegener by Lili Elbe and Niels Hoyer, translated from the German by H. J. Stenningworth. New York: Dutton; London, Jarrold Publishers, 1933.
- Introduction to Anthony M. Ludovici, The Choice of a Mate, London: The International library of sexology and psychology, 1935.
- Introduction and notes to The ethics of sexual acts by René Guyon. New York: A. A. Knopf, 1934. (Translated from the French by J. C. Flügel and Ingeborg Flugel.)
- (ed. with A. Costler, pseud., & A. Willy, pseud.) Encyclopaedia of sexual knowledge, London: F. Aldor 1934.
- 'Birth-control Methods (Contraception, Abortion, Sterliization)', London: George Allen & Unwin,1936.
- Introduction to Sofie Lazarsfeld, Woman's Experience of the Male, London: Encyclopaedic Press, 1938.
- Australia's Population Problem, General Practitioner, 12, 1941, pp. 2–6.
- 'Venereal Diseases and their Prevention: Some Recent Pronouncements', Medical Journal of Australia, vol 23, 1943, pp. 399–300.
- 'Birth Control Methods'. Sydney, Australasian Publishing Company, 1945.
- Sex Problems of Today, Sydney: Angus & Robertson, 1942.
- (as Wykeham Terriss) Sex Talks, 1946.
