= World League for Sexual Reform =

Historical LGBTQ organization

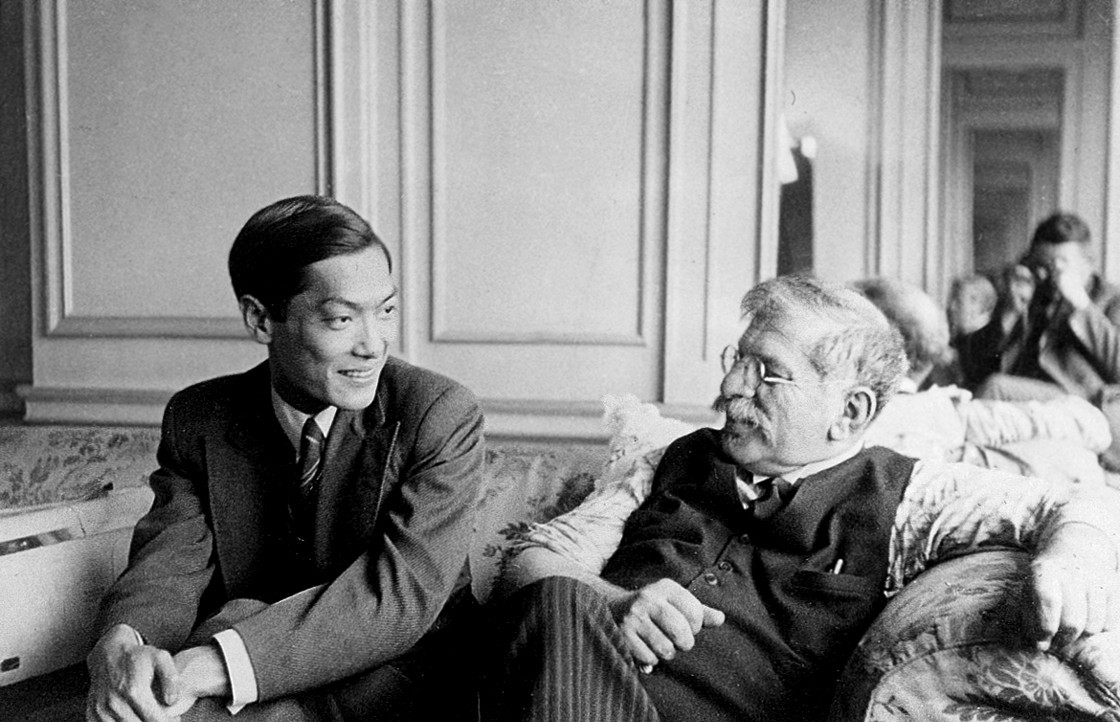
Li Shiu Tong (also known as Tao Li) and Magnus Hirschfeld at the 1932 WLSR conference in Brno

The World League for Sexual Reform was a League for coordinating policy reforms related to greater openness around sex. The initial groundwork for the organisation, including a congress in Berlin which was later counted as the organisation's first, was orchestrated by Magnus Hirschfeld in 1921. It officially came into being at a congress in Copenhagen in 1928.

== Platform ==
The organization advocated a ten-point platform which included:

1. Economic, political, and sexual equality of men and women
2. Secularization and reform of laws on marriage and divorce
3. Birth control to make birth voluntary and responsible
4. Eugenic birth selection
5. Protection of unmarried mothers and "illegitimate children"
6. Rational understanding of intersex people and homosexuals.
7. Comprehensive sex education
8. Reforms to eliminate the dangers of prostitution
9. Treating sexual abnormalities medically, rather than "as crimes, vices or sins"
10. Legalization of sexual acts between consenting adults, while criminalizing sexual acts without consent, or acts upon minors and the mentally disabled. Distinguishing crime from vice.

== History ==
From September 15 to September 21, 1921, Magnus Hirschfeld organised the First International Congress for Sexual Reform on the Basis of Sexual Science in Berlin, which formed the original groundwork for the League. The World League for Sexual Reform officially came into existence on July 3, 1928, at its congress in Copenhagen. Representatives came from many countries: England, the United States, Canada, Germany, France, Russia, Austria, Switzerland, Czechoslovakia, Italy, the Netherlands, Belgium, Spain, Japan, Norway, Sweden, Denmark, Iceland, Lithuania, Egypt, Liberia, Argentina, Chile, the British Indies, and Malaysia.

Ralf Dose has written an overview of the League. Congresses were held in Copenhagen (1928), London (1929), Vienna (1930), and Brno (1932). Congress speakers included: Hirschfeld, Norman Haire, Vera Brittain, Dora Russell, Charles Vickery Drysdale (from the Malthusian League), Stella Browne, Ernst Gräfenberg, Marie Stopes, M. D. Eder (a pioneer psychiatrist), Laurence Housman, George Ives, Eden Paul, Alexandra Kollontai, Max Hodann, Felix Abraham (who with Dr Ludwig Levy-Lenz performed the world's first sex-change operation in 1931 at Hirschfeld's Institut für Sexualwissenschaft in Berlin), Bernard Shaw, Bertrand Russell, Ethel Mannin, Harry Benjamin, Peter Schmidt, William J. Robinson (an American contraception crusader) and Jack Flügel, a Freudian psychologist who assisted Norman Haire and Dora Russell organize the Congress and also led the Men's Dress Reform Party. Although not a speaker, Albert Einstein was in contact with the Congress.

Magnus Hirschfeld, the British physician Havelock Ellis and Swiss psychiatrist Auguste Forel were elected the first presidents of the World League. From 1930, Norman Haire and Dane Jonathan Leunbach replaced the elderly and largely inactive Ellis and Forel, but they remained Honorary Presidents.

In 1928 Francis Turville-Petre, British archaeologist and friend of Christopher Isherwood, stayed at Hirschfeld's institute in Weimar Berlin. Whilst based in Berlin, Turville-Petre was an active member of the Scientific-Humanitarian Committee, which campaigned for gay legal reform and tolerance, and attended the Second Congress in Copenhagen in 1928.

In 1929 Hirschfeld presided over the third international congress held at Wigmore Hall, London. Harley Street sexologist, Norman Haire as secretary and Dora Russell as treasurer, jointly organized the event. Hirschfeld's speech praised British scientists as "distinguished pioneers in eugenics". A number of British feminists attended the 1929 conference, including Naomi Mitchison (whose paper was "Some Comment on the Use of Contraceptives by Intelligent Persons"), Dora Russell ("Marriage and Freedom"), Janet Chance, a pioneer of abortion-law reform ("A Marriage Education Centre in London"), Vera Brittain, a writer and pacifist ("The Failure of Monogamy") and Stella Browne ("The Right to Abortion").

By 1930, the League claimed to have 182 individuals as members. It also claimed 190,000 members overall, many of them belonging to affiliated organisations. Groups which constituted portions of its worldwide membership included the German National League for Birth Control and Sexual Hygiene, Scientific-Humanitarian Committee, British Society for the Study of Sex Psychology, and the League for the Protection of Motherhood and Sex Reform.

In 1932, the fourth international conference of the WLSR was organized and hosted by Hugo Iltis in Brno. Plans for a fifth conference in Moscow were scrubbed because of the political stresses caused by the growing power of Hitler and Stalin.

Many of the WLSR's books and records were destroyed by the Nazis during a raid in Berlin on the institute in May 1933. The League ceased to exist in 1935.

== See also ==
- Der Eigene
- Helene Stöcker
