= Institut für Sexualwissenschaft =

German sexology research institute (1919–33)

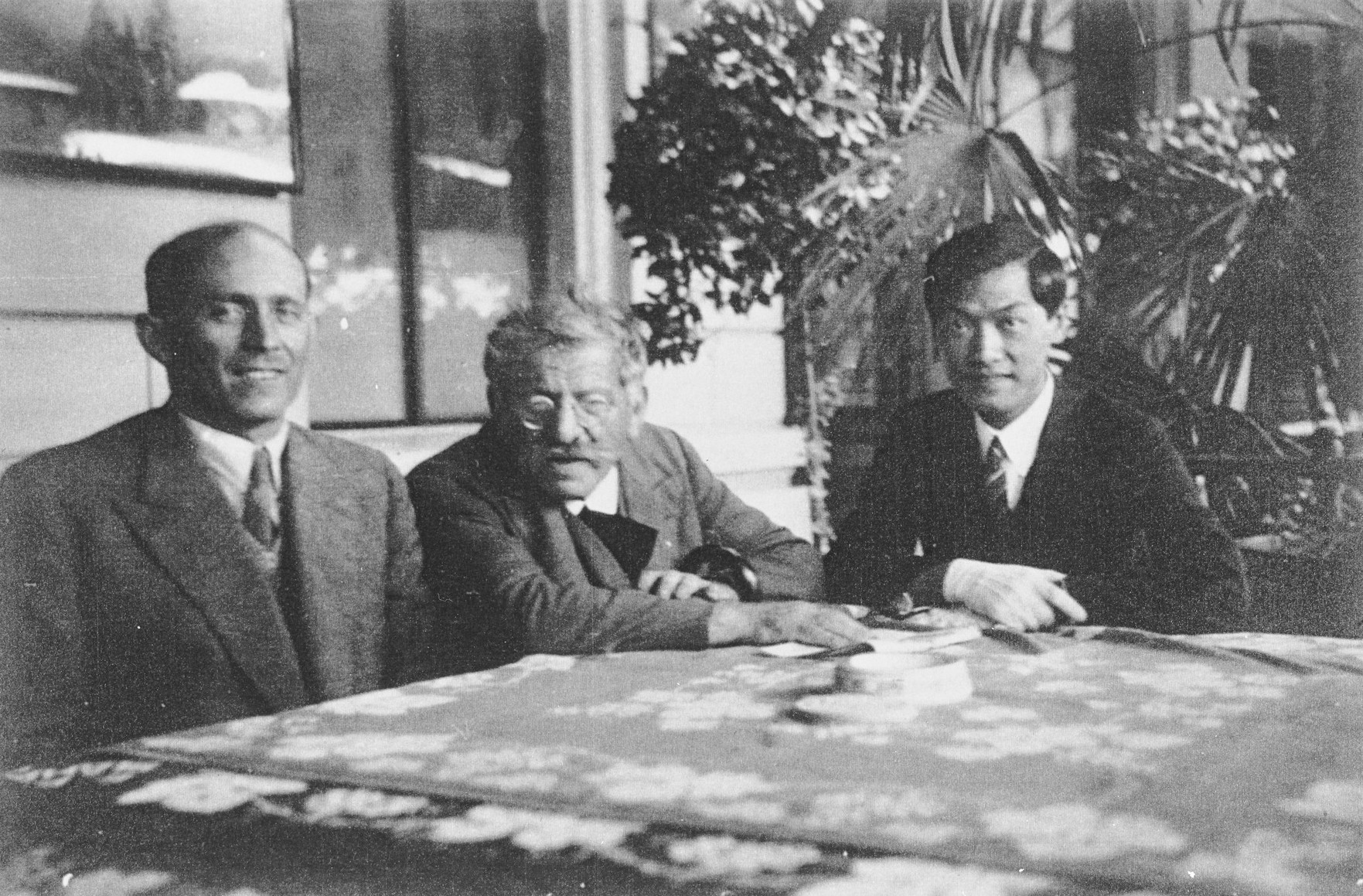
- From left to right: Assistant Director Bernard Schapiro, Director Magnus Hirschfeld, and Hirschfeld's partner Li Shiu Tong
- Other name: Institute for Sexual Science
- Motto: "Per scientiam ad justitiam"
- Motto in English: "Through science to justice"
- Founder: Magnus Hirschfeld
- Established: July 6, 1919; 107 years ago
- Focus: Sexology; Transgender health care Transgender studies
- Address: In den Zelten 9A-10, Beethovenstraße 3
- Location: Tiergarten, Berlin, Germany
- Coordinates: 52.5189°N 13.3652°E
- Interactive map of Institut für Sexualwissenschaft
- Dissolved: 1934

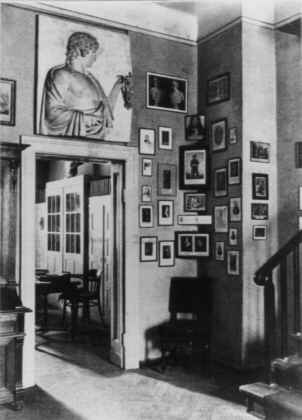
Offices of the Institute in 1920

The Institut für Sexualwissenschaft (English: Institute for Sexual Science) was an early private sexology research institute in Germany from 1919 to 1933. The name is variously translated as Institute for Sexual Research, Institute of Sexology, Institute for Sexology, or Institute for the Science of Sexuality. The Institute was a non-profit foundation situated in Tiergarten, Berlin. It was the first sexology research center in the world.

The Institute was headed by Magnus Hirschfeld, who since 1897 had run the world's first homosexual organization Wissenschaftlich-humanitäres Komitee (Scientific-Humanitarian Committee), which campaigned on progressive and rational grounds for LGBTQ rights and tolerance at the start of the first homosexual movement that would flourish in interwar Weimar culture. The Committee published the long-running journal Jahrbuch für sexuelle Zwischenstufen. Hirschfeld built a unique library at the institute on gender, same-sex love and eroticism.

The institute's founding purpose was to create "scientific research on the entirety of sexual life" and educate German society on its findings. It pioneered research and treatment for various matters regarding gender and sexuality, including gay, transgender, and intersex topics. In addition, it offered various other services to the general public: this included treatment for alcoholism, gynecological examinations, marital and sex counseling, treatment for venereal diseases, and access to contraceptive treatment. It offered education on many of these matters to both health professionals and laypersons.

After the Nazis gained control of Germany in the 1930s, the institute and its libraries were destroyed as part of a Nazi government censorship program by youth brigades, who burned its books and documents in the street.

== Origins and purpose ==
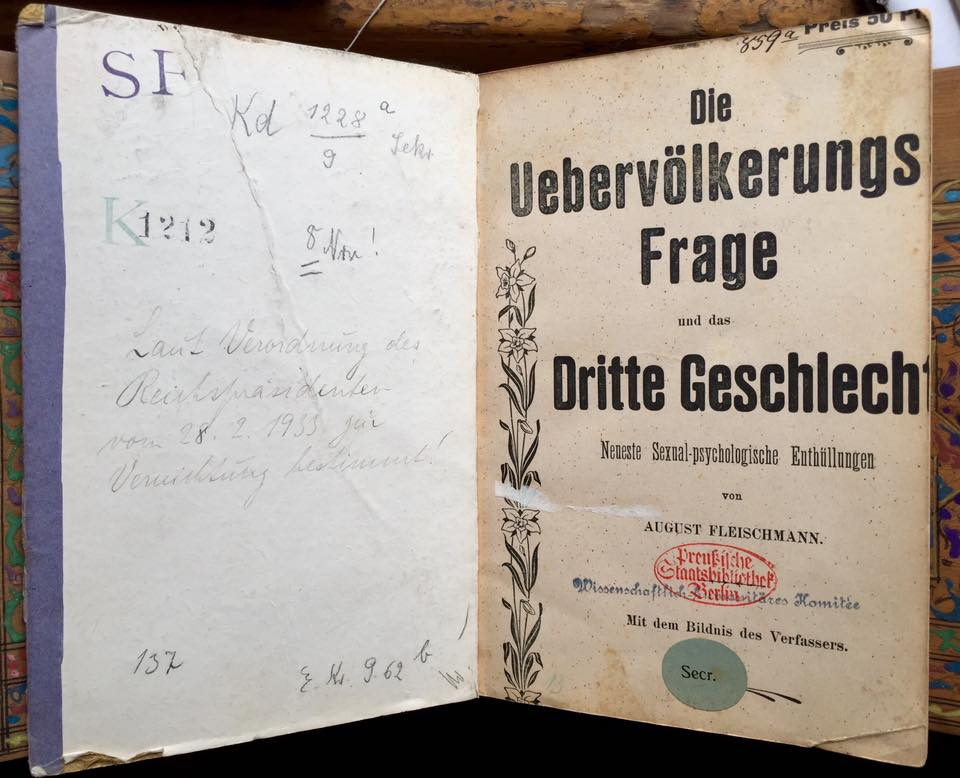
Vita homosexualis, a 1902 collection of August Fleischmann's popular pamphlets on third gender and against Paragraph 175. This copy was earmarked for destruction after being confiscated by the Nazi government on 6 May 1933.

The Institute of Sex Research was founded by Magnus Hirschfeld and his collaborators Arthur Kronfeld, a once famous psychotherapist and later professor at the Charité, and Friedrich Wertheim, a dermatologist. Hirschfeld gave a speech on 1 July 1919, when the institute was inaugurated. It opened on 6 July 1919. The building, located in the Tiergarten district, was purchased by Hirschfeld from the government of the Free State of Prussia following World War I. A neighboring building was purchased in 1921, adding more overall space to the institute.

As well as being a research library and housing a large archive, the institute also included medical, psychological, and ethnological divisions, and a marriage and sex counseling office. Other fixtures at the institute included a museum for sexual artifacts, medical exam rooms, and a lecture hall. The institute conducted around 18,000 consultations for 3,500 people in its first year. Clients often received advice for free. Poorer visitors also received medical treatment for free. According to Hirschfeld, about 1,250 lectures had been held in the first year.

In addition, the institute advocated sex education, contraception, the treatment of sexually transmitted diseases, and women's emancipation. Inscribed on the building was the phrase per scientiam ad justitiam (translated as "through science to justice"). This was also the personal motto of Hirschfeld as well as the slogan of the Scientific-Humanitarian Committee.

== Organization ==
The institute was financed by the Magnus-Hirschfeld-Foundation, a charity which itself was funded by private donations. Along with Magnus Hirschfeld, a number of others (including many professional specialists) worked on the staff of the institute at different points in time, including:

- Felix Abraham – psychiatrist
- August Bessunger – radiologist
- Karl Giese – archivist
- Berndt Götz – psychiatrist
- Hans Graaz – naturopath, medical doctor
- Friedrich Hauptstein – administrative director
- Kurt Hiller – lawyer
- Max Hodann – sex educator
- Hans Wilhelm Carl Friedenthal – anthropologist
- Hans Kreiselmaier – gynecologist
- Arthur Kronfeld – psychiatrist, psychologist
- Ewald Lausch – medical assistant
- Ludwig Levy-Lenz – gynecologist
- Eugen Littaur – otolaryngologist
- Franz Prange – endocrinologist
- Ferdinand von Reitzenstein – ethnologist
- Adelheid Rennhack – housekeeper
- Arthur Röser – librarian
- Bernard Schapiro – dermatologist, andrologist
- Arthur Weil – neuroendocrinologist, neuropathologist
- Friedrich Wertheim – dermatologist

Some others worked for the institute in various domestic affairs. Some of the people who worked at the institute simultaneously lived there, including Hirschfeld and Giese. Affiliated groups held offices at the institute. This included the Scientific-Humanitarian Committee, Helene Stöcker's League for the Protection of Mothers and Sexual Reform, and the World League for Sexual Reform (WLSR). The WLSR has been described as the "international face" of the institute. In 1929 Hirschfeld presided over the third international congress of the WLSR at Wigmore Hall. During his address there, he stated that "A sexual impulse based on science is the only sound system of ethics."

Divisions for the institute included ones dedicated to sexual biology, pathology, sociology and ethnography. Plans were allotted for the institute to both research and practice medicine in equal measure, though by 1925 a lack of funding meant the institute had to cut its medical research. This was to include matters of sexuality, gender, venereal disease, and birth control.

== Activity ==
=== Public education ===
The institute aimed to educate both the general public and specialists on its topics of focus. It became a point of scientific and research interest for many scientists of sexuality, as well as intellectuals and reformers from all over the world. Visitors included René Crevel, Christopher Isherwood, Harry Benjamin, Édouard Bourdet, Margaret Sanger, Francis Turville-Petre, André Gide and Jawaharlal Nehru.

The institute also received visits from national governments; in 1923 the institute was for instance visited by Nikolai Semashko, Commissar for Health in the Soviet Union. This was followed by numerous visits and research trips by health officials, political, sexual and social reformers, and scientific researchers from the Soviet Union interested in the work of Hirschfeld. In June 1926 a delegation from the institute, led by Hirschfeld, reciprocated with a research visit to Moscow and Leningrad.

One particular fixture at the institute which aided its popularity was its museum of sexual subjects. This was built with both education and entertainment in mind. There were ethnographic displays about different sexual norms across different cultures internationally. It included exhibits about sexual fetishism and sadomasochism. A collection of phallic artifacts from around the world was also exhibited. Additionally, there were presentations regarding the diversity of human sexual orientation, particularly with regards to homosexuality. Upon visiting the institute, Dora Russell reflected that it was "where the results of researches into various sex problems and perversions could be seen in records and photographs."

The neighboring property purchased in 1922 by the institute had an opening ceremony on 5 March 1922, after which it became a place for the institute's staff to interact with the public in an educational capacity. Lectures and question-and-answer sessions were held there to inform laypersons on topics of sexuality. The public especially tended to ask questions regarding contraception.

=== Sexual and reproductive health ===
One focus of the institute's research and services was sexual and reproductive health. A subdivision of the institute called the Eugenics Department for Mother and Child offered marital counseling services, and the Center of Sexual Counseling for Married Couples provided access to contraception. It was especially a goal of the institute to make contraceptive services accessible to the poor and working-class of Germany. This was despite a prohibition on advertising birth control in the Weimar Republic's constitution. Following looser regulation on advertising contraceptive methods, the institute published an educational pamphlet on the matter in 1928 which ultimately reached a distribution of about 100,000 copies by 1932. Hirschfeld and Hodann developed pioneering strategies for sex counseling services that would inspire later practices. The institute also offered general gynecology services and treatment for venereal diseases. Experimental treatments for impotence were also implemented.

=== Sexual intermediacy ===
At the institute, Magnus Hirschfeld championed the doctrine of sexual intermediacy. This proposed form of classification said that every human trait existed on a scale from masculine to feminine. Masculine traits were characterized as dominant and active while feminine traits were passive and perceptive (an idea similar to those also commonly held by his contemporaries). The classification was further divided into the subgroups of sex organs, physical characteristics, sex drive or sexuality, and psychological characteristics. Hirschfeld's belief was that all human beings possess both masculine and feminine traits regardless of their sex. In fact, he believed that no one was fully masculine or fully feminine but rather a blend of the two. A man with a female sex drive, for example, would be homosexual, whereas someone with male sex organs and mostly female psychological characteristics would likely be transgender (see also the concepts of sexual inversion and eonism). Someone with exceptionally androgynous sex organs would be intersex. Hirschfeld originally used the term "sexual intermediaries" in the late nineteenth century to refer mostly to homosexual men and lesbians. However, this later expanded to include intersex people, cross-dressers, and transsexuals. His concept of broad sexual intermediacy among humans has been traced to roughly similar ideas held by Charles Darwin and Galen of Pergamon.

==== Transsexuality and transvestism ====
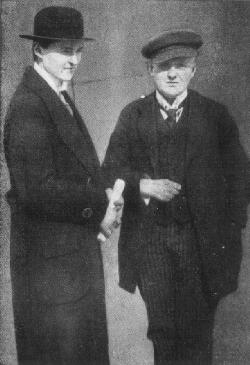
Herbert W. (left) was a transgender friend of Magnus Hirschfeld, and lived for two years in Berlin under his chosen name. This photo is from Hirschfeld's Sexual Intermediates (1922).

Magnus Hirschfeld coined the term transsexual in the 1923 essay Die Intersexuelle Konstitution. This identified the clinical category which his colleague Harry Benjamin would later develop in the United States; only about thirty years after its coining by Hirschfeld did the term enter wider use, with Benjamin's work. Hirschfeld also originally coined the term transvestite in 1910, and he sometimes used the term "extreme transvestites" or "total transvestites" to refer to transsexuals. Other descriptions "in the modern medical sense" also appeared in earlier German medical literature, such as Johann Baptist Friedreich's 1829–1830 work.

Transgender people were on the staff of the institute as receptionists and maids, as well as being among the clients there. Various endocrinologic and surgical services were offered, including an early modern sex reassignment surgery in 1931. Hirschfeld originally advised against sexual reassignment surgeries, but came to support them as a means of preventing suicide among transsexual patients.

Ludwig Levy-Lenz, and surgeon Erwin Gohrbandt performed male-to-female surgery called Genitalumwandlung—literally, "transformation of genitals." This occurred in stages: castration, penectomy and vaginoplasty. (The institute treated only trans women at this time; female-to-male phalloplasty would not be practiced until the late 1940s.) Patients would also be prescribed feminizing hormone therapy, allowing them to grow natural breasts and softer features. Masculinizing hormone therapy was never available at the institute, as testosterone was only synthesised for the first time in 1935, after the institute closed.

Ludwig Levy-Lenz, the institute's primary surgeon for transsexual patients, also implemented an early form of facial feminization surgery and facial masculinization surgery. Additionally, hair removal treatments using the institute's X-ray facility were developed, though this caused some side effects such as skin burns. Professor of history Robert M. Beachy stated that, "Although experimental and, ultimately, dangerous, these sex-reassignment procedures were developed largely in response to the ardent requests of patients." Levy-Lenz commented, "[N]ever have I operated upon more grateful patients."

Hirschfeld worked with Berlin's police department to curtail the arrest of cross-dressers and transgender people, through the creation of transvestite passes. These were issued on behalf of the institute to those who had a personal desire to wear clothing associated with a gender other than the one assigned to them at birth.

==== Homosexuality ====
Works about homosexuality could be found at the institute. The institute's collections included the first comprehensive such compilation of works about sexuality. Different from the Others, a film co-written by Hirschfeld that advocated greater tolerance for homosexuals, was screened at the institute in 1920 to audiences of statesmen. It also received a screening at the institute before a Soviet delegation in 1923, who responded with "amazement" that the film had been considered scandalous enough to censor. It has been categorized alongside other films, such as Der Steinach-Film, as one of the interwar period's educational "enlightenment films".

The researchers at the institute advocated the theory that homosexuality had an innate, biological origin. Working off of the research of Eugen Steinach, who had recently succeeded in reversing the sexual behavior of animal test subjects, Steinach's Institute for Experimental Biology once tested whether or not transplanting the testicles from a heterosexual man to a homosexual man would cure homosexuality. This method of "curing" homosexuality more often than not grew necrotized and resulted in the testicles having to be castrated. The practice was abandoned by 1924. Hirschfeld, who initially supported some of these experiments, questioned whether such practices were medically ethical, and was concerned with the potential they could have for reducing the diversity of natural human phenomena. However, it was considered a potential alternative to self-castration that had previously been performed by some homosexual men. Hirschfeld – who was homosexual himself – viewed homosexuality as natural and inborn, rather than an illness. The experiments were in fact intended to demonstrate the biological basis of homosexuality in the influence of sex hormones.

The institute put adaption therapy into practice as a far more humane and effective method than conversion therapy, as a means of helping patients cope with their sexuality. Rather than attempting to cure a patient's homosexuality, the focus was instead placed on helping the patient learn to navigate a homophobic society with the least discomfort possible. While the doctors at the institute could not outright recommend illegal practices (and, at this time, most all homosexual acts were illegal in Germany), they also did not promote abstinence. They made an effort to help their gay patients find a sense of community, either with other patients, through the Scientific-Humanitarian Committee, or through a network of venues known to the institute that were aimed at gay men, lesbians, and cross-dressers. Additionally, the institute offered them general psychological and medical assistance.

==== Intersexuality ====
The institute presented expert reports about cases of intersex conditions. Hirschfeld is considered to have been a pioneer in this area of study. He advocated for the right of intersex individuals born with ambiguous genitalia to choose their own sex upon reaching the age of eighteen, and indeed assisted intersex people in attaining sex reassignment surgeries. However, he sometimes also advocated strategic sex assignment at birth, on a scientific basis. Photographs of intersex cases were among the collections at the institute – these were used as part of an effort to demonstrate sexual intermediacy to the average layperson.

== Nazi era ==
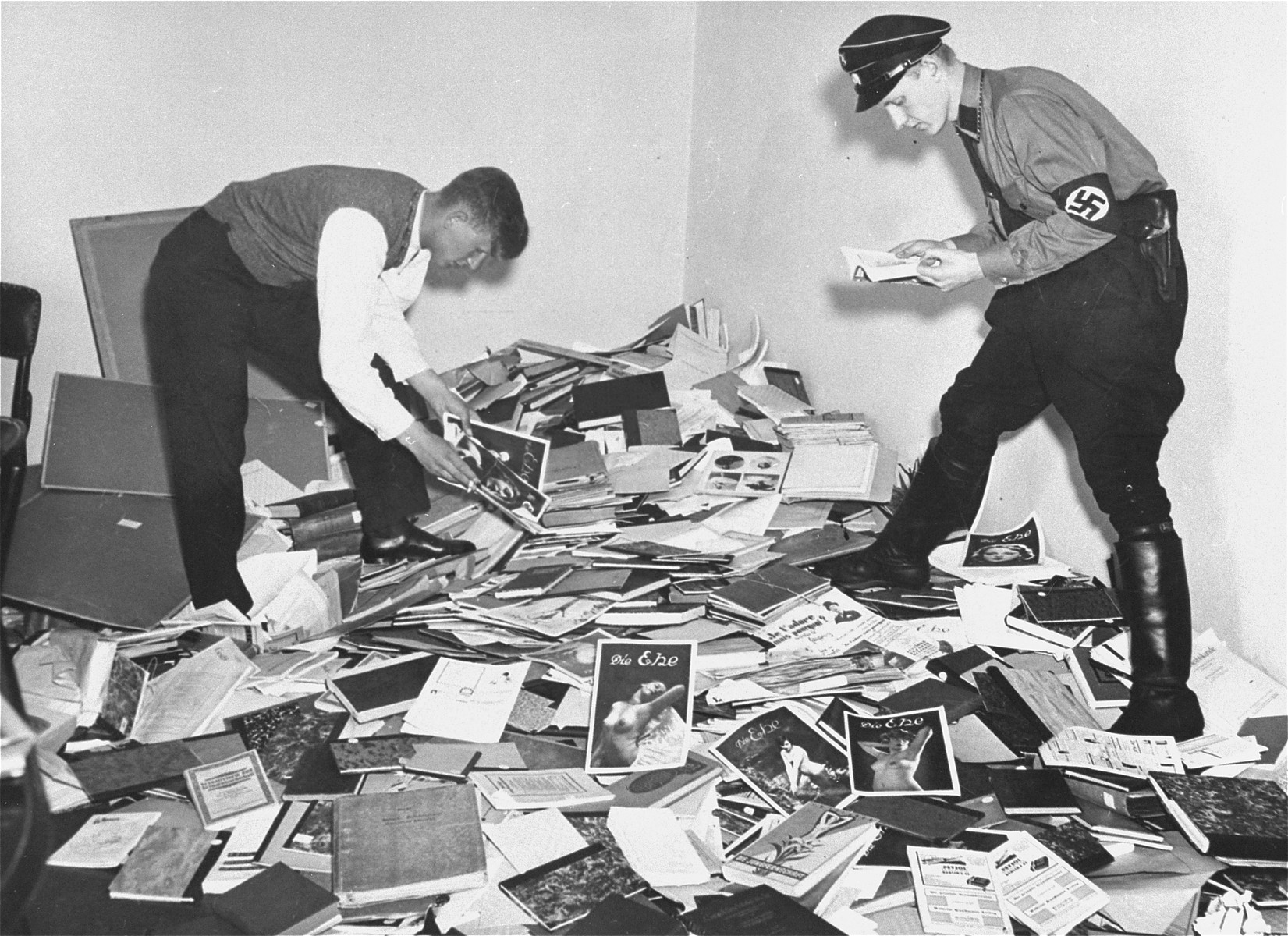
German students and Nazi SA members plunder the library of Magnus Hirschfeld, director of the institute.

=== Background ===
From about the early 1920s onward, Hirschfeld became a target of the far-right in Germany, including the Nazi Party. He was physically attacked during multiple incidents, including an incident in Munich on 4 October 1920 in which he was badly injured. Deutschnationale Jugendzeitung, a nationalist paper, commented that it was "regrettable" Hirschfeld had not died. In another incident in Vienna, he was shot at. By 1929, frequent targeting by Nazis made it difficult for Hirschfeld to continue with his appearances in public. A caricature of him appeared on the front page of Der Stürmer in February 1929; the Nazi Party attacked his Jewish ancestry as well as his theories about sex, gender, and sexuality.

In late February 1933, the Nazi Party launched its purge of gay (then known as homophile) clubs in Berlin, outlawed sex publications, and banned organised gay groups. As a consequence, many fled Germany (including, for instance, Erika Mann). In March 1933 Kurt Hiller, a lawyer affiliated with the institute, was sent to a concentration camp, where he was tortured, though he later fled Germany and survived the war.

=== Raids and book burnings ===
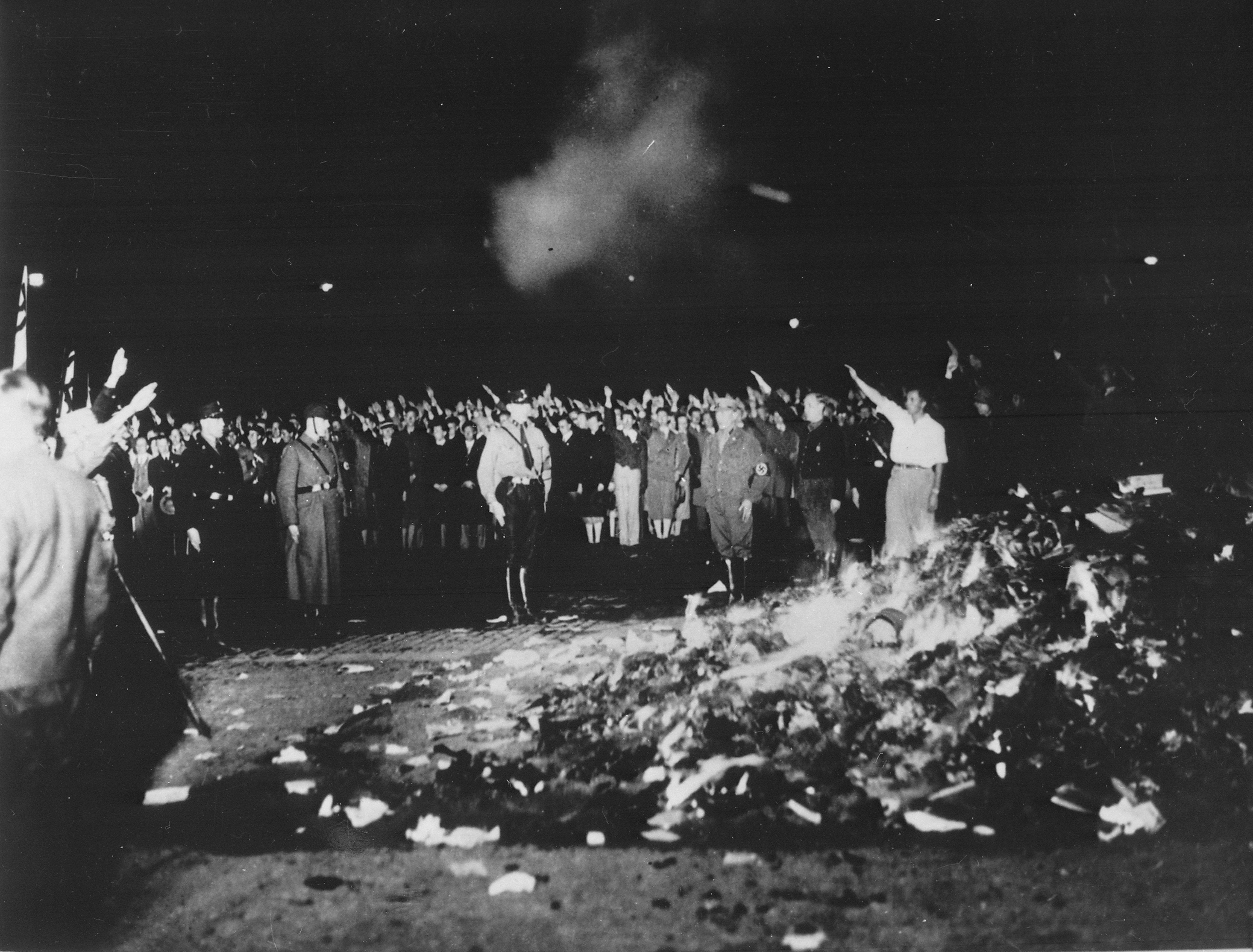
Books from the Institute being burned by Nazi Party members at the Opernplatz on 19 May 1933

On 8 April 1933, the Main Office for Press and Propaganda of the German Student Union (DSt) proclaimed a nationwide "Action against the Un-German Spirit", which was to climax in a literary purge or "cleansing" (Säuberung) by fire. According to historian Karl Dietrich Bracher:

[T]he exclusion of "Left", democratic, and Jewish literature took precedence over everything else. The black-lists ... ranged from Bebel, Bernstein, Preuss, and Rathenau through Einstein, Freud, Brecht, Brod, Döblin, Kaiser, the Mann brothers, Zweig, Plievier, Ossietzky, Remarque, Schnitzler, and Tucholsky, to Barlach, Bergengruen, Broch, Hoffmannsthal, Kästner, Kasack, Kesten, Kraus, Lasker-Schüler, Unruh, Werfel, Zuckmayer, and Hesse. The catalogue went back far enough to include literature from Heine and Marx to Kafka.

Students from the German College of Physical Education loading looted books and publications onto a truck for burning.

On 6 May 1933, while Hirschfeld was in Ascona, Switzerland, the Deutsche Studentenschaft made an organised attack on the Institute of Sex Research. This included approximately 100 students from the Deutschen Hochschule für Leibesübungen (German College of Physical Education). A brass band accompanied them as they arrived in the morning. After breaking into the building, the students destroyed much of what was inside, and looted tens of thousands of items – including works by authors who had been blacklisted in Nazi Germany. Following this, the leader of the students gave a speech before the institute, and the students sang Horst-Wessel-Lied. Members of the Sturmabteilung (SA) appeared later in the day to continue looting the institute. This raid was intentionally staged as a large public event and it attracted a large crowd. The press was notified in advance of the raid.

Four days later, the institute's remaining library and archives were publicly hauled out and burned in the streets of the Opernplatz by members of SA alongside the students. A bronze bust of Hirschfeld, taken from the institute, was placed on top of the bonfire. One estimate says that between 12,000 to 20,000 books and journals, and even larger number of images and sex subjects, were destroyed. Another estimate says that about 25,000 books were destroyed.

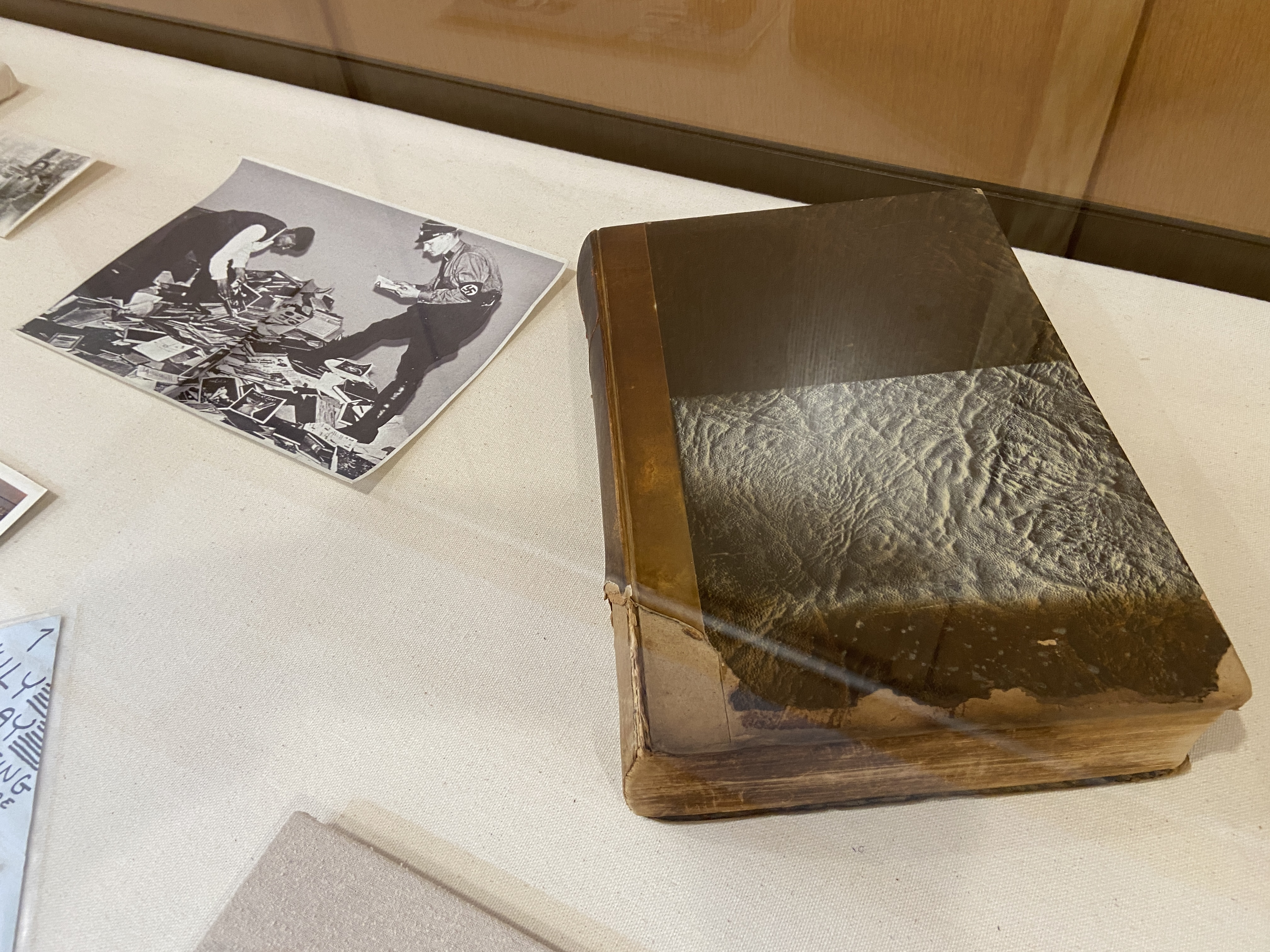
Burnt remains of a book-burning target, Le Marquis de Sade et Son Temps (Marquis de Sade and his times). Part of the Jean-Nickolaus Tretter Collection.

This included artistic works, rare medical and anthropological documents, and charts concerning cases of intersexuality which were prepared for the International Medical Congress, among other things. A collection of works about sexuality, in any one place, similar to the one stored at the institute was not compiled until the founding of the Kinsey Institute in 1947. Also seized were the institute's extensive lists of names and addresses. In the midst of the burning, Joseph Goebbels gave a political speech to a crowd of around 40,000 people. The leaders of the Deutsche Studentenschaft proclaimed their own Feuersprüche (fire decrees). Books burned at the Opernplatz at this time were not solely looted from the institute. Also burned were books by Jewish writers, and pacifists such as Erich Maria Remarque that were removed from local public libraries, bookshops, and the Humboldt University.

The bronze bust of Hirschfeld survived. A street cleaner salvaged and stored it the day after the burnings, and it was donated to the Berlin Academy of Arts after World War II. Reportedly also spared from the destruction were a large collection of psycho-biological questionnaires, pertaining to Hirschfeld's research of homosexuality. The Nazis were assured that these were simple medical histories. However, few of these have since been rediscovered.

=== Aftermath of initial raids ===
On 10 May 1933, Nazi book burnings extended to libraries across dozens of university towns in Germany. According to the Munich Documentation Centre for the History of National Socialism, "100 book burnings were recorded in seventy cities" between March and October 1933. The events were widely noted abroad. In the United States, mass protests against censorship in Germany occurred. Prominent American authors such as Faith Baldwin, Helen Keller, Sinclair Lewis, and Sherwood Anderson denounced the censorship. Many commentators referenced German writer Heinrich Heine's prediction a century earlier that "where one burns books, one will soon burn people."

German novelist and Nobel Prize in Literature laureate Thomas Mann denounced the book burnings as a "stupid ceremony" that represented "national drunkenness". Some German academics, such as Gerhard Schumann, opposed the book burning campaign. Some older professors who were strong supporters of the Nazi Party, like Eduard Kohlrausch (rector of the University of Berlin), opposed the anti-intellectual campaigns of young Nazi students. Kohlrausch wrote to Adolf Hitler to complain that the "immature misguided idealists" were putting "valuable German cultural assets" at risk. In Nazi leadership, there were some doubts about the symbolism of burning books, which had caused accusations that Nazi Germany had descended into "cultural barbarism".

A German newspaper headline soon after the raids declared the "un-German Spirit" (or undeutschen Geist) of the institute. It was forced to shut down. The Nazis took control of the buildings for their own purposes. The destruction of the institute preceded a wider campaign against sexual reform and contraception, which were perceived as a threat to the German birth rate. While many fled into exile, the radical activist Adolf Brand made a stand in Germany for five months after the book burnings, but in November 1933 he had given up gay activism.

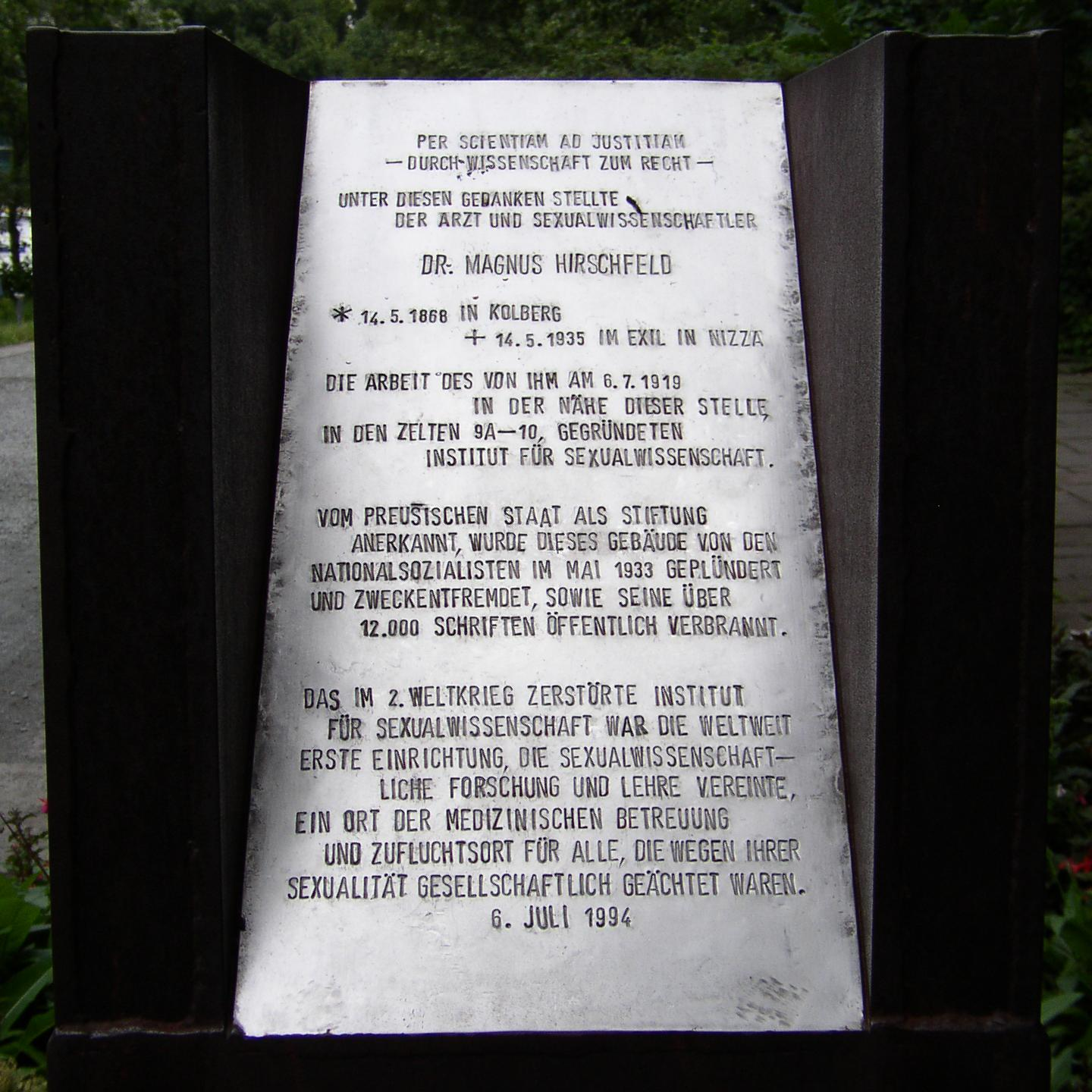
A memorial plaque dedicated to Magnus Hirschfeld and his Institute, located in Berlin Tiergarten

On 28 June 1934, Hitler conducted a purge of gay men in the ranks of the SA wing of the Nazis, which involved murdering them in the Night of the Long Knives. This was then followed by stricter laws on homosexuality and the round-up of gay men. The address lists seized from the Institute are believed to have aided Hitler in these actions. Many tens of thousands of arrestees found themselves, ultimately, in slave-labour or death camps. That included some of the institute's staff, such as August Bessunger. Karl Giese committed suicide in 1938 when the Germans invaded Czechoslovakia; his heir, lawyer Karl Fein, was murdered in 1942 during deportation. Arthur Kronfeld and Felix Abraham also committed suicide. Many survived by fleeing Germany. Among them were Berndt Götz, Ludwig Levy-Lenz, Bernard Schapiro, and Max Hodann.

A handful of staff for the institute stayed behind during Nazi rule, such as Hans Graaz. Friedrich Hauptstein, Arthur Röser and Ewald Lausch even became Nazi collaborators. It is suspected that these may have been spies. Helene Helling, a tenant and receptionist, became a Nazi sympathizer following the raid and occupied the building for some time after it. However, the institute's buildings were a bombed-out ruin by 1944, and were demolished sometime in the mid-1950s. Hirschfeld tried to reestablish his institute in Paris as the Institut Français des Sciences Sexologiques, but dissolved it in 1934 after it failed to gain traction. He moved to Nice, and died in France in 1935. He was buried at the Cimetière orthodoxe de Caucade.

== After World War II ==
The charter of the institute had specified that in the event of dissolution, any assets of the Dr. Magnus Hirschfeld Foundation (which had sponsored the institute since 1924) were to be donated to the Humboldt University of Berlin. Hirschfeld also wrote a personal will while in exile in Paris, leaving any remaining assets to his students and heirs Karl Giese and Li Shiu Tong (Tao Li) for the continuation of his work. However, neither stipulation was carried out. The West German courts found that the foundation's dissolution and the seizure of property by the Nazis in 1934 was legal. The West German legislature also retained the Nazi amendments to Paragraph 175, making it impossible for surviving gay men to claim restitution for the destroyed cultural center.

Li Shiu Tong lived in Switzerland and the United States until 1956, but as far as is known, he did not attempt to continue Hirschfeld's work. Some remaining materials from the institute's library were later collected by W. Dorr Legg and ONE, Inc. in the United States in the 1950s.

On the ground of the Institut für Sexualwissenschaft was built the Haus der Kulturen der Welt. A bar with the name Magnus Hirschfeld Bar and a garden is named Lili Elbe garden.

== Later developments ==
In 1973, a new Institut für Sexualwissenschaft was opened at the University of Frankfurt am Main (director: Volkmar Sigusch), and 1996 at the Humboldt University of Berlin.

== See also ==
- Destruction of Warsaw § Burning of libraries
- German bombing of Belgrade − included the deliberate destruction of the National Library of Serbia
- List of libraries damaged during World War II
- State Archives of Naples − Italian historical archive that was deliberately destroyed by German soldiers during World War II
