= Bernard Schapiro =

Jewish doctor

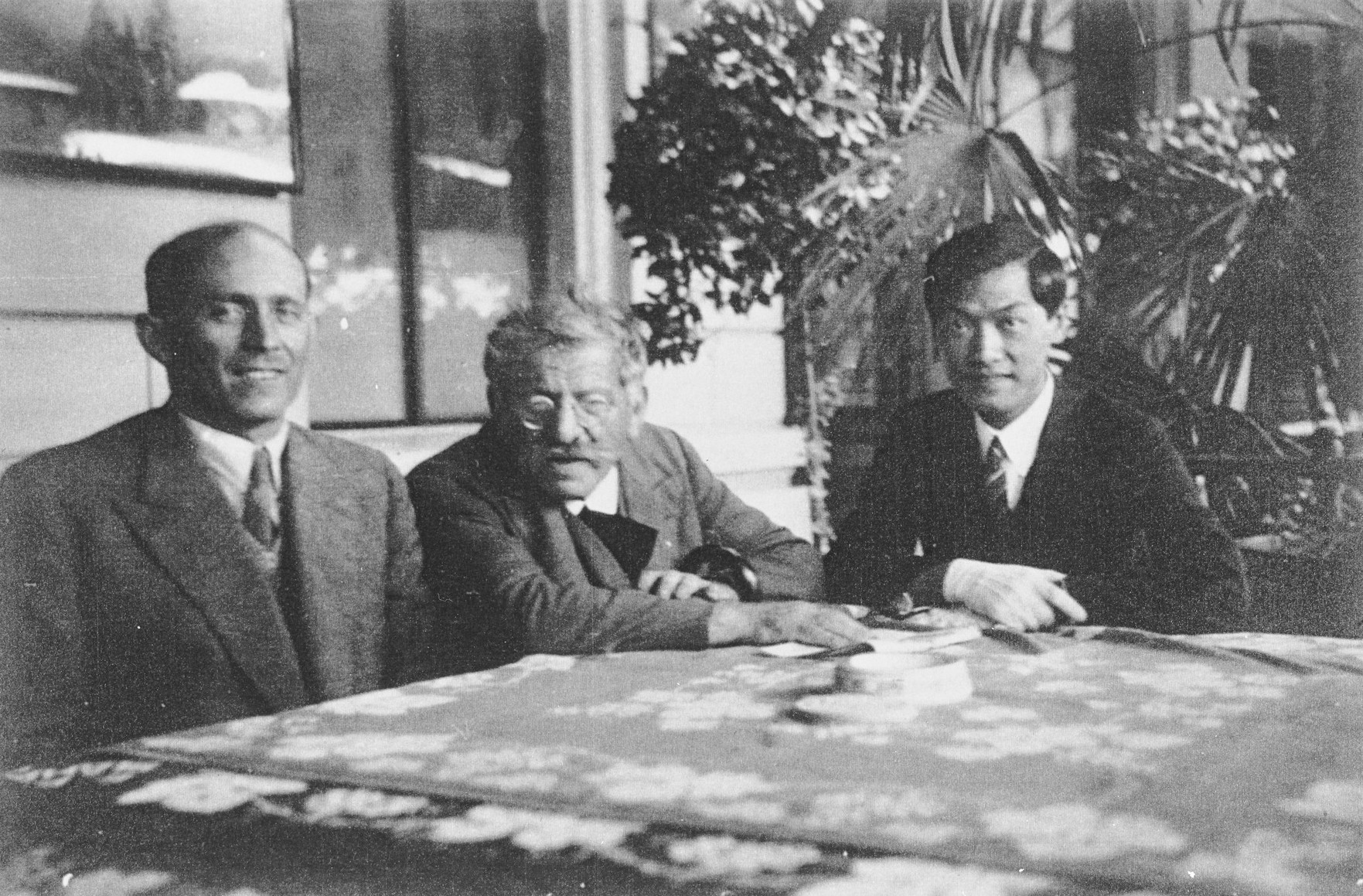
- Bernard Schapiro (left), with sexologists Magnus Hirschfeld and Li Shiu Tong. Unknown date.
- Born: 1885; Daugavpils, Latvia
- Died: December 31, 1966 (aged 81); Jerusalem, Israel

Bernard (Dov) Schapiro (1885 – December 31, 1966) was a Latvian endocrinologist. The later part of his career was in New York and Jerusalem.

== Early life and education ==
Bernard Schapiro was born in Daugavpils, Latvia — an area known for its Jewish settlements. He spent his early life immersed in Orthodox Judaism and Talmudic studies until the age of 18.

Schapiro was educated at the Yeshivas Knesses Yisrael in Kaunas (formerly Kovno) where he was regarded as an extraordinary student (illui). This institution also exposed him to the Musar movement, profoundly influencing his life.

Supported by Rabbi Joseph Rosen (the Rogatchover Gaon), Schapiro was allowed by his parents to study medicine, relying on his adherence to Jewish commandments and values. He acquired the requisite knowledge in Frankfurt, before enrolling for medical studies at the University of Zurich from 1913 to 1919. His 1920 doctoral dissertation explored the relationship between erythema nodosum and tuberculosis. Schapiro completed a year-long internship at the Department of Dermatology in Breslau, Silesia, and two years of specialized training under the tutelage of German dermatologist Josef Jadassohn at the University of Breslau.

== Career ==
Upon completing his training, Schapiro relocated to Berlin, taking up a post as co-director at the Magnus Hirschfeld Institute for Sexual Science. Initially, his focus was on treating sexually transmitted diseases, but he gradually became involved in male sexual development issues and sexual dysfunction. Schapiro pioneered the development of the drugs Praehormon, Testifortan, and Praejaculin, contributing to the scientific understanding of the hormonal impact of the pituitary gland on undescended testes, and initiating hormonal therapy which forms the basis of modern treatment for cryptorchidism.

With the rise of Adolf Hitler in 1933, the Institut für Sexualwissenschaft was raided, looted, and eventually closed by the Nazis. Leveraging his Swiss citizenship, Schapiro and his family escaped to Zürich, where he established a private practice. Here, he treated infertility using medical and psychotherapeutic approaches and founded the Swiss branch of the Mizrachi, a religious Zionist movement.

In 1940, Schapiro and his family moved to New York City. After passing the US medical licensing exams, he established a successful practice as an endocrinologist, earning the respect of the Jewish community for treating patients in accordance with Jewish law (Halakha).

Schapiro made notable contributions to the understanding of premature ejaculation (PE). Departing from the 1917–1950 view of PE as a psychosomatic disorder, in 1943 he proposed that PE was due to overanxious personality and a suboptimal ejaculatory apparatus. He categorized PE into two types: Type B, indicating consistent rapid ejaculation, and Type A, leading to erectile dysfunction.

In 1951, Schapiro and his wife immigrated to Israel and settled in Jerusalem. He founded the Endocrinologic Department at the Hebrew University.

== Personal life and legacy ==
Schapiro married Tekla (Tehila) Feuchtwanger in 1922, with whom he had four children, all born in Berlin.

Schapiro died on December 31, 1966, in Jerusalem. His gravestone bears the inscription: "He remained a student of Slabodka all his days."
