= Dora Russell =

British writer, feminist and socialist campaigner (1894–1986)

Dora, Countess Russell
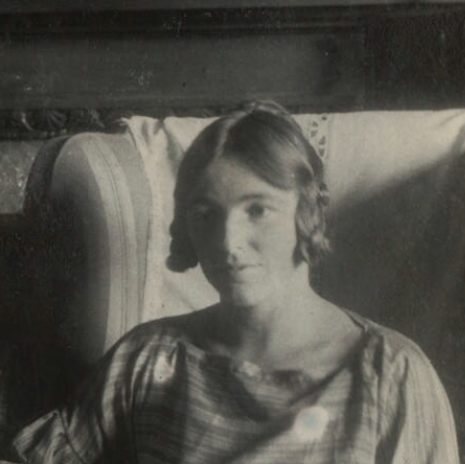
- by Lady Ottoline Morrell in 1922 (cropped)
- Born: Dora Winifred Black; 3 April 1894; Thornton Heath, Croydon, Surrey, England
- Died: 31 May 1986 (aged 92); Porthcurno, Cornwall, England
- Occupations: Author and social activist
- Political party: Labour
- Spouse: Bertrand Russell (m. 1921; div. 1935)
- Children: 4

Dora Winifred Russell, Countess Russell (née Black; 3 April 1894 – 31 May 1986) was a British author, a feminist and socialist campaigner, and the second wife of the philosopher Bertrand Russell. She was a campaigner for contraception and peace. She worked for the UK-government-funded Moscow newspaper British Ally, and in 1958 she led the "Women's Peace Caravan" across Europe during the Cold War.

== Early life ==
Dora Winifred Black was born at 1 Mount Villas, Luna Road, Thornton Heath, Croydon, in Surrey, into an English upper-middle-class family, the second of four children. Her father, Sir Frederick Black, worked his way up in the Civil Service and laid great store by his children's education, regardless of their gender. She went to a private co-educational primary school near her parents' home and won a junior scholarship to Sutton High School. In 1911, she spent nearly a year at a private boarding school for girls in Germany, in preparation for the 'Little Go' at Cambridge. There she won a modern languages scholarship to Girton College, Cambridge. Soon she joined the Heretics Society, co-founded by C.K. Ogden in 1909. It questioned traditional authorities in general and religious dogma in particular. The society helped her to discard traditional values and develop her own feminist mode of thought. In June 1915, she received a first class degree with distinction in Modern Languages at Girton.

== Career ==
After the victory of the Bolsheviks in the October Revolution in Russia, Russell decided to attend the Second World Congress of the Comintern with Marjory Newbold and others, in support of Bolshevik cause.

== Birth control campaigning ==
Russell supported Rose Witcop and Guy Aldred and who were prosecuted for publishing Margaret Sanger's Family Limitation which was a guide to contraception. Their action was denounced by a magistrate as "indiscriminate" publication and the contraception guides were to be destroyed. Russell, her husband and John Maynard Keynes, paid the legal costs of the unsuccessful appeal.

In 1924 Russell campaigned for birth control with the support of Katharine Glasier, Susan Lawrence, Margaret Bonfield, Dorothy Jewson, H. G. Wells and John Maynard Keynes and founded the Workers' Birth Control Group which provided advice on birth control to working-class women. In the same year she ran unsuccessfully as a Labour candidate for Chelsea. She campaigned in the Labour Party for birth control clinics, but the party was afraid of losing the support of Roman Catholic voters. She said that she hated the Labour Party after the leadership overruled her lobbied support at the 1925 convention. Public male ally H. G. Wells refused to support her campaign which he believed was only of appeal to women.

General election 1924: Chelsea
Party	Candidate	Votes	%	±%
Unionist	Samuel Hoare	13,816	65.7	+8.7
Labour	Dora Russell	5,661	26.0	−1.5
Liberal	Iolo Aneurin Williams	1,557	7.4	−8.1
Majority		8,155	38.8	+9.3
Turnout		29,582	71.1	+7.3
Unionist hold		Swing	+5.1	

In 1929 Russell organised the World League for Sexual Reform's highly successful Congress in London with the Australian-born birth control campaigner Norman Haire. Held over the course of five days in Wigmore Hall it was attended by leading intellectuals including George Bernard Shaw, Margaret Sanger and Sigmund Freud who debated topics that included psychoanalysis, prostitution, censorship, and contraception.

== Beacon Hill School and views on education ==
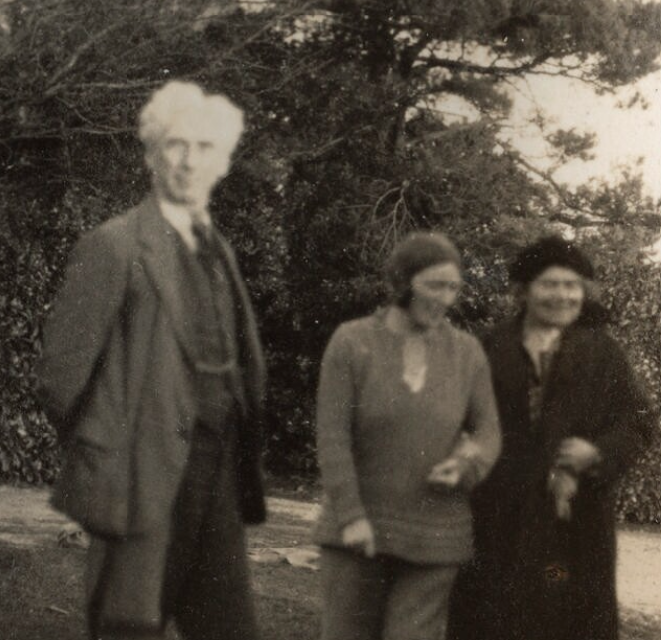
Bertrand, Dora and the feminist headteacher Lucy Mary Silcox in 1922

In 1927 Russell founded a progressive school called Beacon Hill School, with Bertrand Russell, in which they tried to teach children to leave behind superstition and the irrational views of previous generations. Instead, Russell espoused scientific, libertarian and progressive education, with one former student reminiscing:

"One of my fondest memories is of the Natural History lessons with Dora, based on the study of that great tome ‘The Science of Life’ (by H. G. Wells, Julian Huxley & G. P.Wells). Dora encouraged us to question, to follow our curiosity […] into all sorts of highways & bye-ways of phenomena of life; to speculate; to wonder […] I remember sheer fascination and a sense of the infinity of the field of knowledge that was waiting to be explored."

Russell expressed her views on education in a book called In Defence of Children. Russell ran the school on her own until World War II.

== World War II ==
During the war, Russell moved to London to work for the Ministry of Information in their Reference Division, located in a London University building near the British Museum. There, she wrote reports to order on various subjects. From there, she joined the group employed by the British Government to create the newspaper British Ally: Britansky Soyuznik. The newspaper was published in Moscow via the British Embassy for six years. It mirrored a Soviet newspaper published in London, and both had started due to a 1942 treaty. The newspaper was intended to give details of the British war effort; it was well illustrated and well-received in Russia.

== Peace activism ==
After the war, she became an advocate of the peace movement and was one of the founding members of the CND, in which she joined with other prominent leftists (Bertrand Russell, J. B. Priestley, Michael Foot, Victor Gollancz among others) in campaigning for worldwide nuclear disarmament.

"It has taken us centuries of thought and mockery to shake the medieval system. – With this in view I have taken as impulses, instincts, or needs certain driving forces in the human species as we know it at present, and argued for such social and economic changes as will give them new, free, and varied expression. To take even this first step towards a happy society is a herculean task. After it has been accomplished, generations to come will see what the creature [us] will do next. We none of us know; and we should be thoroughly on our guard against all those who pretend that they do."

She was still speaking on peace issues on 2 April 1981, when she addressed a Merseyside Peace Week.

=== Women's Peace Caravan ===
The Campaign for Nuclear Disarmament was formed in 1957. On 20 May 1958 Russell set out from Edinburgh with fifteen other women on what became known as the "Women's Peace Caravan". The motorised caravan set out for Moscow and to make links with other women across Europe.

== Relationship with Bertrand Russell ==
By the autumn of 1915, Dora Black had moved to London and begun postgraduate studies in eighteenth-century French thought at University College London. She first met Bertrand Russell in 1916 when joining him on a weekend walking tour. However, the pair did not embark on a relationship before 1919, when Russell invited her to join him during his summer holidays. Before that, Black had supported Russell in his campaign against military conscription in World War I.

Black and Russell visited Soviet Russia in 1920, soon after the Bolshevik revolution. Russell was unimpressed by Vladimir Lenin, but Black, like many English socialists at the time, saw a vision of a future ideal civilisation. The couple also visited China.

=== Marriage to Bertrand Russell ===
Dora and Russell were married on 27 September 1921 at Battersea Town Hall, with Eileen Power and Frank Russell acting as witnesses. Dora, who was seven months pregnant with the couple's first child, John, wore black during the ceremony. Their second child Kate was born in 1923.

She had at first rejected Russell's offer of marriage. In common with some radical women of her generation, she felt the laws regulating marriage contributed to women's subjugation. In her view, only parents should be bound by a social contract, and only insofar as their co-operation was required for raising their children. Implicit was her conviction that both men and women were polygamous by nature and should therefore be free, whether married or not, to engage in sexual relationships that were based on mutual love. In this she was as much an early sexual pioneer as in her fight for women's right to information about, and free access to, birth control. She regarded these as essential for women to gain control over their own lives, and eventually become fully emancipated. Her husband was a supporter of radical views but she said that she was expected to do the "bottle-washing".

She published her book on the inadequate education of women and inequality with the title Hypatia or Woman and Knowledge in 1925. The prologue explains why she chose the title: "Hypatia was a university lecturer denounced by Church dignitaries and torn to pieces by Christians. Such will probably be the fate of this book."

Russell became Countess Russell on 3 March 1931, when Bertrand Russell's elder brother Frank died and her husband became the 3rd Earl Russell.

During their open marriage, Dora had an ongoing relationship with left-wing journalist Griffin Barry. They had two children whilst she was still married to Russell: Harriet Ruth Barry (1930-2024), and Roderick Barry (1932-1983). Bertrand at first registered Harriett as his own daughter, but found the dynamic emotionally untenable and he began an affair with his student (and the children’s sometime nanny), Patricia Spence. Dora noted that during the subsequent divorce, her husband used all of his privilege to gain advantage.

== Death ==
Russell died at Porthcurno, Cornwall, on 31 May 1986, aged 92. Her ashes were scattered in the garden there.

== Bibliography ==
- (with Bertrand Russell) The Prospects of Industrial Civilization. London: G. Allen & Unwin, 1923.
- Hypatia or Woman and Knowledge. London: Kegan Paul, Trench, Trübner, 1925.
- The Right to Be Happy. New York and London: Harper & Bros. 1927. OCLC 1091095.
- In Defence of Children. London: H. Hamilton. 1932. OCLC 6749463.
- The Tamarisk Tree: My Quest for Liberty and Love. London: Virago. 1975.
- The Religion of the Machine Age. London: Routledge & Kegan Paul. 1983. ISBN 9780710095473.
