= Russian State Film and Photo Archive =

Coordinates: 55.8205°N 37.3415°E

Russian State Archive of Film and Photo

Agency overview
- Formed: 1926
- Jurisdiction: Government of Russia
- Website: www.rgakfd.ru

Russian State Film and Photo Archive (Russian: Российский государственный архив кинофотодокументов), also known as Russian State Documentary Film and Photo Archive, or Krasnogorsk Archive, or simply RGAKFD (Russian: РГАКФД), is an archive of documentary newsreels and photographs located at Krasnogorsk, Moscow Oblast, Russia. The archive contains more than 1 million photos and has a virtually complete collection of newsreels from 1919 to 1985 that documents the political, military, and other diverse episodes of the USSR.

== See also ==
- State Archive of the Russian Federation
