= Francis Turville-Petre =

British archaeologist

Francis Adrian Joseph Turville-Petre (4 March 1901 – 16 August 1942) was a British archaeologist, famous for the discovery of the Homo heidelbergensis fossil Galilee Man in 1926, and for his work at Mount Carmel, in what was then the British Mandate of Palestine, now Israel. He was a close friend of Christopher Isherwood and W. H. Auden.

== Life ==
Francis Turville-Petre was born into a Catholic, landed gentry family in England, the oldest of the five children of Oswald and Margaret Petre (née Cave). He was the older brother of Gabriel Turville-Petre, the noted scholar of Icelandic and early Scandinavian. The family moved to the ancestral home of Bosworth Hall, Husbands Bosworth, Leicestershire in 1907.

Turville-Petre went up to Exeter College, Oxford in 1920. He was admitted as a Diploma student in Anthropology at Michaelmas Term, 1921, studying physical anthropology and cultural anthropology (ethnology with archaeology and technology at the Pitt Rivers Museum). He was awarded the Certificate in Physical Anthropology in 1922 and a Diploma in 1924. Following the completion of his studies in Oxford, Turville-Petre went to work on excavations in the Levant.

In 1925 he conducted digs in two caves in the Nahal Amud in Galilee, Israel, Mugharet el-Zuttiyeh (Robber's Cave) and Mugharet el-Emirah (Princes' Cave), both near the Sea of Galilee. It was in the Zuttiyeh cave that he discovered the partial frontal cranial remains of what was first thought to be a Neanderthal individual. The fossil was dubbed the "Galilee skull" and was eventually classified as Homo heidelbergensis. Galilee Man was the first hominid fossil to be unearthed in Western Asia. The fossil is presently housed in the Rockefeller Museum in Jerusalem, and a cast of the skull is on permanent display in the Israel Museum. Turville-Petre was later invited by Dorothy Garrod to join her excavations at Kebara Cave on Mount Carmel. He also took part in excavations in the Sulaimaniya administrative region in Iraqi Kurdistan in October – December 1928, excavating with Garrod the caves of Zarzi and Hazar Merd.

In 1928 he moved to Berlin, Germany, and resided at the Institute of Sexual Research, run by Dr Magnus Hirschfeld. Whilst based in Berlin Turville-Petre was an active member of the Scientific Humanitarian Committee, which campaigned for gay legal reform and tolerance, and attended the Congress of the World League for Sexual Reform (also founded by Hirschfeld) in Copenhagen in 1928. Known by his friends as 'Fronny', Turville-Petre was openly gay. He encouraged his friend Christopher Isherwood to join him in Berlin, and together with W. H. Auden they enjoyed life, and especially the nightlife, in the city. Turville-Petre left Berlin in 1931 and took up residence on his private rented island of Agios Nikolaos (St Nicolas) near Euboea, in Greece. Isherwood visited him there in 1933.

Turville-Petre was the model for the title character of a lost play by Auden, The Fronny (1930). For the central character of their 1935 play The Dog Beneath the Skin, Auden and Isherwood preserved the name Francis and the idea of the character's wanderings through Europe, but the character in the 1935 play did not resemble Turville-Petre himself.

Isherwood's stay with Turville-Petre on Agios Nikolaos has been described as "farcical but grim", and in 1959 Isherwood wrote a lightly fictionalised version of Fronny in Down There on a Visit, where he is portrayed as Ambrose, the mad king of a small Greek island.

Turville-Petre died of syphilis in Cairo, Egypt, in 1942 at the age of 41. His archaeological collections from the Middle East are held by the Pitt Rivers Museum, University of Oxford.

== Selected works ==
- 1927 Francis A J Turville-Petre; Dorothea M A Bate; Charlotte Baynes; Arthur Keith Researches in Prehistoric Galilee, 1925–1926 London, Council of the British School of Archaeology in Jerusalem
- 1932 "Excavations in the Mugharet el-Kebarah" Journal of the Royal Anthropological Institute of Great Britain and Ireland 62, 271–276
- 1932 "Excavations at the Cave Mugharet-el-Kebarah, near Zichron Jakob, Palestine" Man 32(20), 15

== Sources ==
- Bar-Yosef, O., B. Vandermeersch, B. Arensburg, A. Belfer-Cohen, P. Goldberg, H. Laville, L. Meignen, Y. Rak, J. D. Speth, E. Tchernov, A-M. Tillier, and S. Weiner, 1992, "The Excavations in Kebara Cave, Mt. Carmel" Current Anthropology 33(5), 497–550
- Bar-Yosef, Ofer and Callander, Jane, 1997, "A forgotten archaeologist: the life of Francis Turville-Petre" Palestine Exploration Quarterly
- Lehmann, John, 1976, "Two of the Conspirators" Twentieth Century Literature Christopher Isherwood Issue 22(3), 264–275
- Page, Norman, 2000, Auden and Isherwood: The Berlin Years Palgrave Macmillan, London ISBN 978-0-312-22712-8
- Diploma students in Anthropology at Oxford University
