= Delta landfill =

Coordinates: 49.1003°N 123.0050°W

The Delta landfill is a landfill south of Vancouver B.C. Vancouver has owned and operated the Vancouver Landfill in Delta since 1966. It's now used by Vancouver, Delta, B.C., Richmond, White Rock, the University Endowment Lands and portions of South Surrey—or about 40 per cent of the population of the region. Garbage collected in Vancouver by City crews is taken to the Vancouver South Transfer Station (VSTS) and then transported in City of Vancouver tractor trailers to the city's Landfill in Delta. At the current maximum authorized disposal rate, the Delta landfill could accommodate Vancouver's solid waste disposal needs for another 30 to 40 years.

The Delta Landfill is located beside the Fraser River. The site is a dump for demolition materials, such as wood and asphalt shakes.

== Fire ==
In November 1999 a landfill fire started at the Delta Shake and Shingle site. A state of emergency was declared in Delta to help the firefighters battle the underground blaze at the landfill. The site is a dump for demolition materials, such as wood and asphalt shakes, resulting in an environmentally hazardous smoke. High pollution levels were also detected in water running off from the fire. Water poured on the Delta Shake and Shingle Site by firefighters has mixed with naturally decaying wood to produce potentially toxic run-off. At the peak of the fire it covered an area more than a hectare and burned 20 meters deep. The entire operation took over six months at a cost of four million dollars.

== See also ==
- Cache Creek landfill
