= Sexualpsychopathologie =

1923 book by psychiatrist Arthur Kronfeld

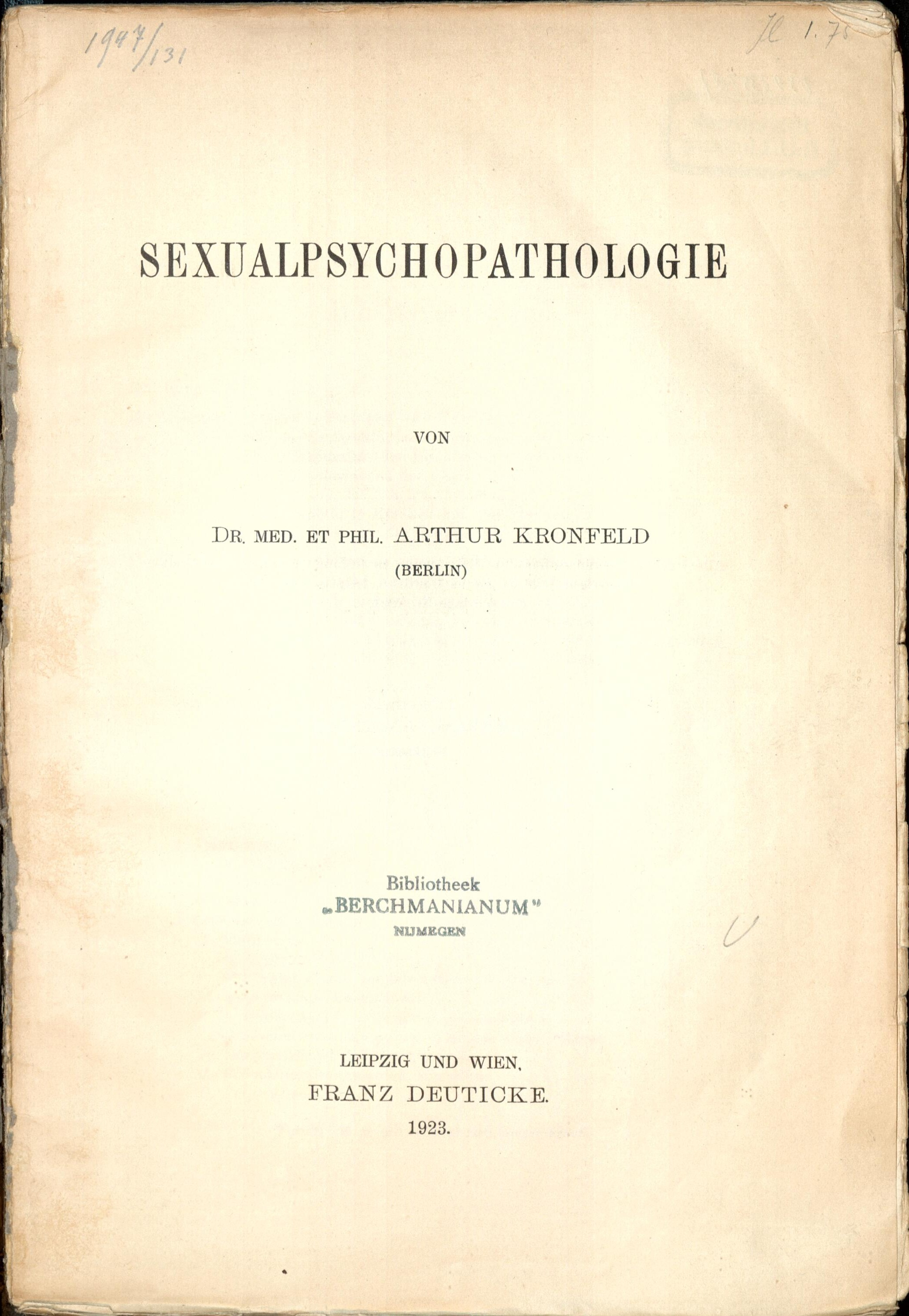
- Author: Arthur Kronfeld
- Genre: Philosophy/Psychiatry
- Publication date: 1923

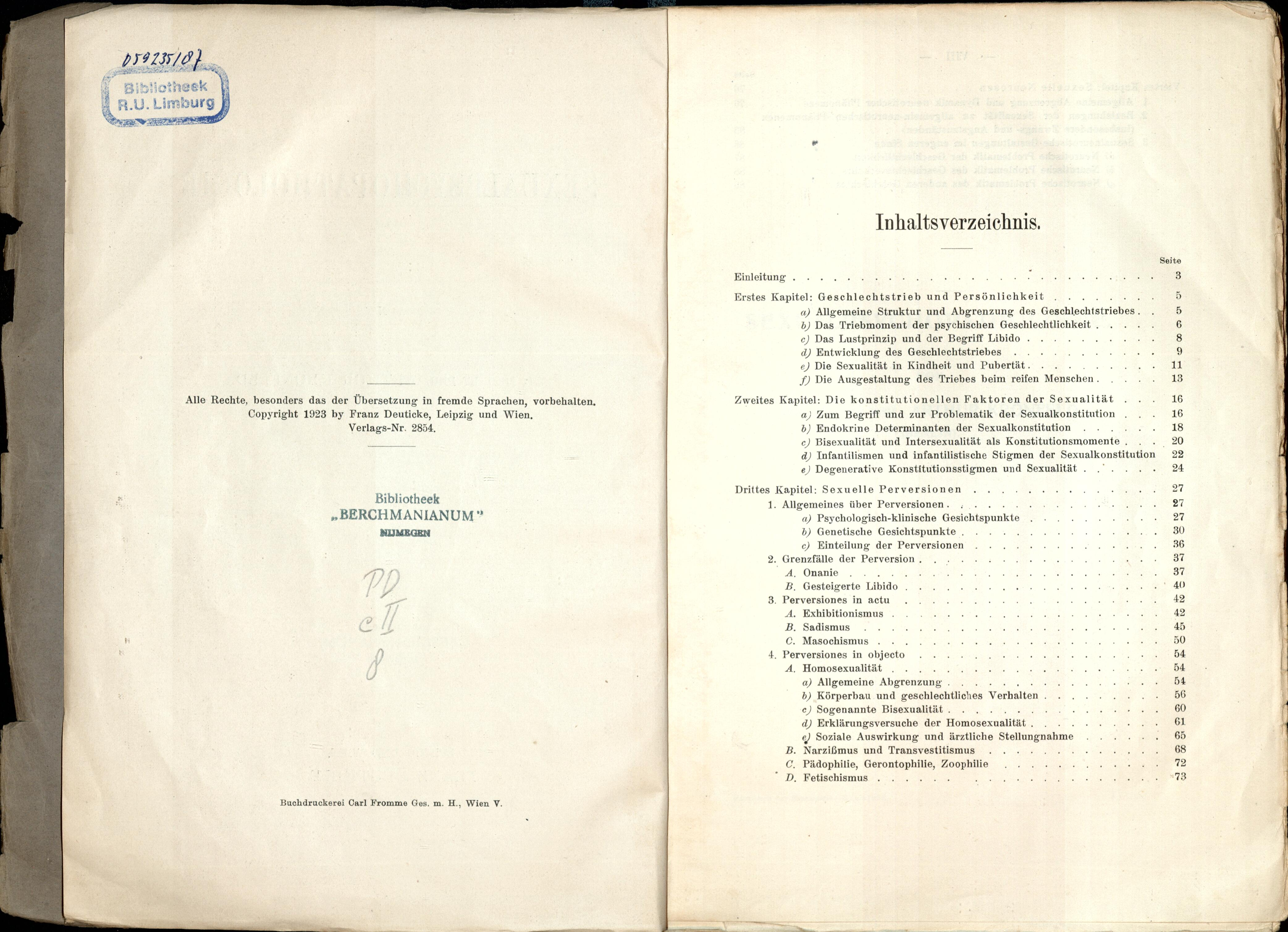
Table of contents

Pdf of the book

Sexualpsychopathologie (translated: sexual psychopathology) is a book written by German-Jewish psychiatrist Arthur Kronfeld, published in 1923. It aims to give a systematic account of human sexuality and its related perversions and sexual neuroses. It was intended as a guide for psychiatrists, sexologists, and forensic clinicians.

== Context ==
In the late 19th century the modern study of sexuality originated with Psychopathia Sexualis by Richard von Krafft-Ebing, in which multiple sexual perversions (sexual abnormalities) were classified for the first time within the field of psychiatry. Other prominent researchers in the field, like Magnus Hirschfeld and Albert Moll, helped to expand the field with works like "Die Homosexualität des Mannes und des Weibes" (translated: the homosexuality of men and women) and "Das Sexualleben des Kindes" (translated: the sexual life of the child). With his work Three Essays on the Theory of Sexuality, Sigmund Freud later introduced the idea that sexuality is largely determined by early childhood development of the libido, which then in turn is also the cause for most sexual neuroses or perversions. By the early 20th century, the field of sexual psychopathology was an established sub-discipline of psychiatry in Central Europe.

Kronfeld studied medicine in Jena, Munich, Berlin and Heidelberg and received his medical doctorate in 1909. Later he decided to do work in experimental psychology in Giessen, which earned him a Doctor of Philosophy (PhD). He gained recognition in academic circles through his works regarding Freudian ideas. For financial reasons he accepted a position at the Institute of Sexology in 1919, where he worked under Magnus Hirschfeld. The institute was considered revolutionary for its time. There Kronfeld was head of the department of "sexual suffering of the soul" (translated from: "seelische Sexualleiden"). His roles included forensic work, teaching and publishing work in the field of sexual science. One of his publications during that time was "Sexualpsychopathologie".

== Contents ==
The book is divided into four chapters. In the first chapter, "Geschlechtstrieb und Persönlichkeit" (translated: sexual drive and personality), Kronfeld defines the libido as the functions of the psyche that are primarily active during sexual intercourse. He describes the development of sexuality from infancy to childhood, while drawing on Freud's theories of autoerotism, narcissism, and the Oedipus complex, especially for early stages. He also emphasizes the role of constitutional factors and personality development.

The second chapter "Die konstitutionellen Faktoren der Sexualität" (translated: the constitutional factors of sexuality) presents several biological determinants of sexuality. Here Kronfeld theorizes how individual differences and dysfunctions in the endocrine system can influence physiological and psychological development of sexuality.

The third chapter "Sexuelle Perversionen" classifies three types of sexual perversions. Borderline cases include onanism (masturbation) and excessive libido, which according to Kronfeld are not always considered as perversions, depending on the situation. Perversiones in actu are defined as abnormalities in sexual behavior itself, which includes exhibitionism, sadism, masochism, voyeurism and triolism (sexual intercourse involving three or more people). Perversiones in objecto are defined as abnormalities in the object/target of sexual desire, these include homosexuality, bisexuality, narcissism, transvestism, pedophilia, gerontophilia, zoophilia and fetishism. Here Kronfeld provides theoretical and clinical discussions of each perversion, including potential treatments for those.

The fourth chapter "Sexuelle Neurosen" describes sexual neuroses. According to Kronfeld these include all psychological symptoms that are primarily caused by the abnormal processing of one's sex drive, which often goes hand in hand with the presence of sexual perversions, which are defined as abnormalities in the sex drive itself.

== Reception ==
Sexualpsychopathologie was first published in a separate edition of Gustav Aschaffenburg's Handbuch der Psychatrie (originally published in 1911) (translated: manual for psychiatry) in 1923. This manual was contained texts written by leading German psychiatrists and it was widely used in clinical practice, so Kronfeld’s work reached a broad professional audience. Kronfelds approach was regarded to combine both biological and psychosocial explanations of sexuality, which stood in contrast to Hirschfelds, primarily biological model. Later scholarly works have cited Sexualpsychopathologie in discussions and studies on cross-gender identity, pedophilia and homosexuality . One source has noted that Kronfeld was one of the first to challenge the view that there is an increased prevalence of neurotic symptoms among homosexuals. The Institute of Sexology was later considered as revolutionary for its time and both Hirschfeld and Kronfeld openly spoke out against Paragraph 175, a law that criminalized homosexual acts in Germany. After the Nazis seized power in 1933, the Institute was destroyed and its books were burned, thereby destroying much of the work done there.

After the Second World War there was a shift in the field of sexual psychopathology. With the rise of behaviorism in psychological research and works like the Kinsey reports published in 1948 and 1953, there was more focus towards empirical research. In 1973 the American Psychiatric Association (APA) removed homosexuality from the second version of its Diagnostic and Statistical Manual of Mental Disorders (DSM). Later editions adopted the concept of paraphilias, which limits diagnoses to non-consensual or distressing sexual interests.

Kronfeld himself left the Institute of Sexology in 1926 and opened his own private medical practice in Berlin. From there on, his writings focused more on general Psychiatry, rather than sexuality.
