= Max Karl Tilke =

German ethnographer

Max Karl Tilke (6 February 1869 – 2 August 1942) was a German costume designer, ethnographer, historian of fashion design, illustrator, Kabarett artist, and painter of the Weimar Republic.

== Life ==
=== Early life ===
Tilke was born in Breslau (Wrocław), Prussian Silesia, as a son of the bookseller Carl August Tilke and his wife Louise Halisch. At the age of 17 he entered the Prussian Academy of Arts in 1886 and, as a student, traveled to the Kingdom of Italy and French Tunisia in 1890. After graduating from the academy, he worked first in Berlin as an artist/decorator, and then at the Museo del Prado in Madrid as a copyist. This period had a great influence on the formation of Tilke's work. After Spain, he worked in Paris as an illustrator in 1900. At this point, he was already known for his knowledge of costumes.

Returning to Berlin, he began to paint works of historical costumes, which gained him a reputation among the authorities and in high society. In 1911, at the Lipperheide Costume Library of the Kunstgewerbemuseum Berlin, Tilke had an exhibition of his first collection. The exhibition was so well received that it was purchased for the library with state money.

=== Berlin ===
When Tilke returned to Germany, he opened the first cabaret in Berlin on October 1, 1901, which was called "The Hungry Pegasus" ("Zum hungrigen Pegasus"). Tilke had become acquainted with it in Paris, and in Berlin he had the role of the conferencier (master of ceremonies). The cabaret was located in a small back room of the Italian restaurant "Dalbelli" at the Potsdamer Brücke. Among the (regular) guests and performers were Charles Horning, Ernst Griebel, Erich Mühsam, Georg David Schulz, Hans Hyan, Hanns Heinz Ewers, Maria Eichhorn ("The Dolorosa") et al. with sketches, songs and programs. Half a year later, Tilke decided to return to painting full-time and the Hungry Pegasus disbanded.

In 1912 he and Magnus Hirschfeld published the book Die Transvestiten - eine Untersuchung über den erotischen Verkleidungstrieb mit umfangreichem casuistischen und historischen Material (2nd edition) on cross-dressing. Tilke was responsible for the illustrations. He was also interviewed by Hirschfeld about his life and cross-dressing for the book, and identified as Case 6 ("Herr F."). He is also believed to be photographed on Tafel XXIII in Der erotische Verkleidungstrieb.

In 1913, his friend Hanns Heinz Ewers helped Tilke to find a job at the "Deutsche BIOSCOP GmbH Filmgesellschaft", Neubabelsberg/Berlin. He was responsible for the costume design; for example for the movie Kadra Sâfa (1914).

=== Tbilisi ===
Meanwhile, his growing reputation resulted in his coming to the attention of the Russian imperial court from which he received a small commission. The Tsar was so pleased with Tilke's work that he was invited to Tbilisi to work at the Caucasus Museum to paint the costumes in the museum's collections as well as to undertake an ethnological expedition to enlarge the collection. In 1912/1913 he worked there as a professor.

Tilke's plan was to paint the costumes in the museum's collections as well as to undertake an ethnological expedition to paint subjects in situ. While this approach was perhaps more creative, practical realities rendered it inefficient. To overcome the many obstacles this method presented, a compromise solution was reached. Each model in national costume was photographed (in some instances the names of the models are still known); then the costume was purchased; and finally, the painting was made from studying both the photograph and the actual costume. The results are works that combine ethnological accuracy with a talented artist's eye for character, place, detail, and emotion. However, whenever possible, Tilke painted his works directly from the models.

=== World War I and later life ===
The outbreak of World War I put an end to the project before it was completed, and Tilke returned to Germany, taking some of his paintings with him. During the War, Tilke worked for the publishing union, Deutsche Verlag Union, in Stuttgart, painting works about the war, but he continued his interest in ethnic costumes and published several works on the topic. His most famous work, Orientalische Kostume in Schnitt und Farbe (Oriental Costume: Their Designs and Colors), was published in 1922.

A man named Max Tilke, born in Breslau on the 6th, February 1869, is listed in the Nazi Party central card index as becoming a member of the Party with serial number 1,146,241 on the 1st, May 1932.

Tilke died of heart failure in Berlin in 1942.

=== Private life ===
In 1897 Tilke married the seamstress Anna Boelter in Berlin. The couple divorced in 1902. He remarried in 1906 to the Danish Christine Nielsen, and was divorced again in 1912. The marriages resulted in two children. In the Transvestiten case interview, Tilke (as "Herr F") talked in detail about his life-long habit of cross-dressing and sexual experiences with both men and women.

== Legacy ==
Toward the end of his life, he lent his name to a collaboration with Wolfgang Bruhn. Bruhn, Wolfgang, and Tilke, Max, Kostümwerk, Verlag Ernst Wassmuth, 1955, as translated into English as A Pictorial History of Costume and republished in 1973 by Hastings House). A copy of one of his books has been digitized and is online at the Indiana University Libraries.

Some years ago there was small exhibition on Lydia Bagdasarianz, Tilke's assistant, at the Völkerkundemuseum Zürich (Ethnographic Museum of the University of Zürich), Switzerland.

Recently, there was an exhibition on Max Tilke's work (German Painters in Georgia. 19th-20th Centuries, 19 May 2017 – 08 Oct. 2017) at the Georgian National Museum in Tbilisi, Georgia. A publication is available, but rare.

At the Lipperheidische Kostümbibliothek, Berlin, a large collection of pictures and drawings is available for research.

== Bibliography ==
- Tilke, Max Karl. “National Costumes from East Europe, Africa and Asia.” New York, Hastings House, 1978.
- Tilke, Max Karl. “Costume Patterns and Designs.” New York, Rizzoli, 1990.
- Tilke, Max Karl. “Oriental Costumes Their Designs and Colors.” Berlin: E. Wasmuth, 1922. Electronic version of English translation prepared by: Celestina Wroth and Jian Liu Reference Department, Indiana University Libraries, June, 1997. indiana.edu, April 29, 2004
- Hirschfeld, Magnus/Tilke, Max: "Die Transvestiten - eine Untersuchung über den erotischen Verkleidungstrieb mit umfangreichem casuistischen und historischen Material" (2nd edition)

== Sources ==
- Vollmer, Hans: "Allgemeines Lexikon der bildenden Künstler des XX. Jahrhunderts."
- Thieme, Ulrich/Becker, Felix: "Allgemeines Lexikon der bildenden Künstler von der Antike bis zur Gegenwart."
- Jelavich, Peter: Berlin cabaret. Harvard 1996 (2nd Edition), p. 86-88.
