= Willi Pape =

German dancer and bar owner

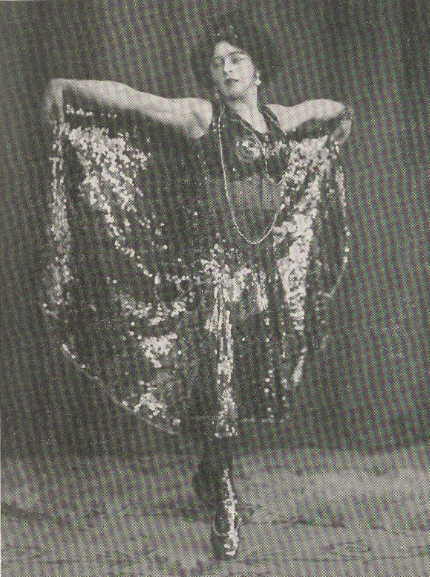
Photography of Willi in The Transvestites

Willi Pape (Willy Pape, Voo-Doo, Selma Brügge; 7 October 1891–21 February 1940) was a celebrated German dancer, variety show performer and later a bar owner in Weimar Berlin who was contemporarily referred to as a "transvestite."

== Life ==
As a child, Willi Pape preferred female clothing and wanted to work in a circus or on stage. Pape presented as female and signed into several hotels as Selma Brügge. 21 September 1909, staff of a Hamburg hotel found unconscious "Selma" in her room with slit wrists, and after discovery of the patient's true identity, the story was widely published in newspapers. The reports attracted the attention of the German sexologist Magnus Hirschfeld, who visited the recovering patient and later wrote the following to accompany pictures of Pape in his 1912 book The Transvestites:

The young transvestite Willy Pape, whose propensity to dress in women's clothing became known during a suicide attempt [in 1909]. His parents were made aware of this peculiar condition by the author and then allowed him to go onto the Variété, where he has since then performed with great success as a snake dancer.

After Pape's suicide attempt, the name "Selma Brügge" was not used again. When summoned for military service in 1914, Pape presented in female clothing. According to Hirschfeld, who used masculine pronouns for Pape, Pape did not find men attractive at the time of their first encounter; Pape had confessed to being in love with and engaged to a woman, and later had a male lover.

Pape became a famous cabaret artist and variety-show dancer, initially performing under the name "Sura VooDoo", later shortened to "Voo-Doo"/"Voo Doo" while wearing orientalized versions of female belly-dancing attire in acts such as "Opium Death" and "Elagabalus." Initially Voo-Doo was not billed as a female impersonator, only later utilizing the "sex reveal" at the end of the dance routines. In 1927, the German lesbian magazine Die Freundin published photographs of Pape captioned: "The Transvestite Voo-Doo, One of the Most Prominent International Dance-stars." Pape performed in Berlin, Zürich, Paris, Vienna, and other major European cities between 1917 and 1928. In 1928 the dancer decided to retire from performing, decision probably influenced by aging and the declining popularity of variety shows.

In September 1928 the couple of Pape and Emil Schmidt opened a bar "Zum Kleinem Löwen" on Berlin's Skalitzer St. 7, often just called "Voo-Doo" by the patrons. It was advertised as a "Meeting Place for Transvestites". In the llustrated Guide to 'Depraved' Berlin (1931), Curt Moreck (a pseudonym of German author Konrad Haemmerling) described "Voo-Doo" as a good nightlife spot for "befriended couples" looking for an "exotic night." Klaus Mann and Christopher Isherwood visited Pape's local.

"Zum Kleinem Löwen" closed in 1933, at the same time as most of the gay bars in the capital. Pape and Schmidt's establishment was not among the bars whose closure was decreed by the Reich, and we do not know to what extent pressure was exerted by the Nazi authorities.

On May 17, 1937 (a symbolic date for the German homosexual community, because 17/5 referred to Paragraph 175 of the German Criminal Code), drunken Willi Pape tried to seduce a soldier named Wilhelm Späth. The soldier, inconvenienced, asked a Gestapo officer for help, which led to Pape's arrest and sentencing under §185 (insult) to a fine of 200 Marks on September 6, 1937. The judgment stated that Willi avoided prison only because of the previous clean record.

In 1939/1940, Pape and Schmidt opened a new establishment at 25 Joachim-Friedrich-Str. in the Wilmersdorf district; they lived there with Willi's father, Ernst.

Pape might also have been an artist, as drawings by "Voo-Doo," "a Lady dancer" survive.

Willi Pape died on 21 February 1940 from malaria.

== Legacy ==
Like most variety stars, Voo-Doo's legacy has been quickly forgotten once the variety show lost its popularity to the cinema. The figure was rediscovered by a modern gay community, with Siegessäule magazine including Voo-Doo's photo in a 1987 issue dedicated to "750 warm Berliners" and Rosa Vinkel Verlag republishing Hirschfeld's "Berlins Drittes Geschlecht" in 1991.

German scholar Jens Dobler, who has uncovered much of Pape's biography, writes of "Willi Pape, alias Voo-Doo," as a homosexual "drag artist" (in German: Travestiekünstler) who was referred to by others as "he" and "she;" he also discusses how Pape's life challenged gender norms and that even the terms he has applied are fraught. No known documents survive that describe Pape's gender or sexual identification in Pape's own words.
