= Max Marcuse =

German dermatologist and sexologist (1877–1963)

Max Marcuse (April 14, 1877, Berlin – June 24, 1963, Tel Aviv) was a German dermatologist and sexologist. He became an editor for Magnus Hirschfeld’s Journal of Sexology in 1919 and continued editing the journal until 1932. Marcuse immigrated to Palestine in 1933, following the Nazi rise to power. Several of Marcuse's unpublished writings are being preserved at the Kinsey Institute.
