= Die Transvestiten: Eine Untersuchung über den Erotischen Verkleidungstrieb =

1910 book by Magnus Hirschfeld

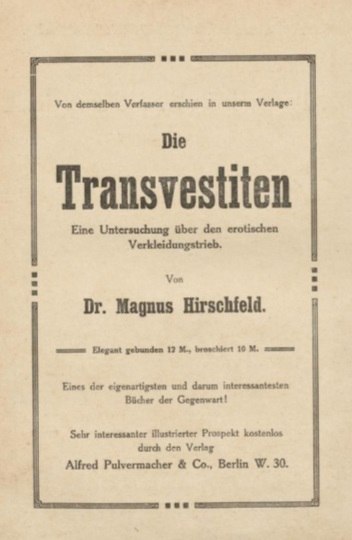
- Author: Magnus Hirschfeld
- Original title: Die Transvestiten: Eine Untersuchung über den Erotischen Verkleidungstrieb
- Working title: Transvestites: The Erotic Drive to Cross-Dress
- Translator: Michael Lombardi-Nash
- Language: German; English
- Subject: Transvestism, crossdressing, transgenderism
- Genre: Sexology
- Publisher: Medicinischer Verlag, Alfred Pulvermacher & Co.
- Publication date: 1910
- Publication place: Berlin, Germany
- Pages: 562
- ISBN: 978-0366808076
- OCLC: 14774739

Die Transvestiten: Eine Untersuchung über den Erotischen Verkleidungstrieb is a classic 1910 book on crossdressing and transvestism that was written by German sexologist Magnus Hirschfeld. An illustrated companion second volume to the book was published by Hirschfeld and Max Tilke in 1912. In addition, a second edition of Die Transvestiten was published by Hirschfeld in 1925. Subsequent to its publication, the book was translated into English with the title Transvestites: The Erotic Drive to Cross-Dress by Michael Lombardi-Nash in 1991.

== Background ==
Hirschfeld was himself gay and an occasional crossdresser, known by other Berlin crossdressers as "Aunt Magnesia". It has been said that Die Transvestiten was the most significant and authoritative text on transvestism of its time. While the book is about crossdressing, it also clearly includes some people with cross-gender feelings who would likely be referred to as transgender today. The book has often been overlooked in the English-speaking academia.

== Contents ==
Die Transvestiten includes first-person narratives of crossdressing, Hirschfeld's commentaries on these cases, and theorizing based on the observations. The book features 17 narratives; 16 of them natal male, and one natal female. In the book, Hirschfeld wished to distinguish transvestism and transgenderism from other forms of sexual and/or gender variance, like homosexuality and paraphilias like fetishism and sadomasochism. Hirschfeld coined the term transvestism in the book.

== Legacy ==
The original data for the cases in the book was destroyed by the Nazis in 1933 when they burned down Hirschfeld's Institut für Sexualwissenschaft (Institute for Sexual Science) in Berlin.

Hirschfeld was an early supporter for trans people, and his colleague Harry Benjamin became a key advocate for the trans community during the mid-1900s. Benjamin carried forward the arguments made in Die Transvestiten, which centered upon arguing for transgenderism as its own concept, different from homosexuality, fetishism, or psychopathology.

Selections from the book form the second chapter of The Transgender Studies Reader, a 2006 book edited by Susan Stryker and Stephen Whittle. The collection was seminal in the field of transgender studies and won the 2007 Lambda Literary Award for Transgender Literature. The reader compares Hirschfeld's writing to other early clinical literature on transgender themes, including that of Richard von Krafft-Ebbing, Karl von Westphal, Max Marcuse, and Havelock Ellis.

== See also ==
- Die Homosexualität des Mannes und des Weibes (Hirschfeld, 1914)
