= James Lewin =

German-Jewish psychiatrist and physician (1887–1937)

James Lewin (Russian: Джемс Натанович Левин, romanized: Dzhems Natanovich Levin; 28 October 1887 in Berlin – 31 December 1937 in Chelyabinsk, USSR) was a German-Jewish psychiatrist and physician.

== Life ==
=== Early life and education ===
James Lewin was born the son of the merchant, Nathan Lewin (1852-1909) and Agathe Lewin (née Wedel) (1853-1904) from Pomerania, Prussia. He was the third of five children.

He attended the Sophien-Gymnasium school in Berlin. He then studied medicine and philosophy at the Friedrich-Wilhelms University (now Humboldt University of Berlin) from the winter semester of 1907. For one semester, he studied in Leipzig, where he attended lectures by Wilhelm Wundt and Wilhelm Wirth. In 1912, Lewin received his doctorate in philosophy from Friedrich-Wilhelms University with a thesis on the subject of the French idealist pantheist, Nicolas Malebranche. This work is still cited today in philosophical works on the subject.

In October 1913, Lewin received his license to practice medicine. He was then employed from November 1913 to May 1916 as an assistant to Ernst Simmerling at the lunatic hospital of the University of Kiel. After this, he moved to Leipzig and worked there as a medical assistant to Paul Flechsig at the university's Psychiatric and Mental Hospital, where he received a second doctorate in 1917. In this work he wrote about situational psychoses

He married the soprano, Clara Abramowitz, in March 1917, and a son was born in Lichtenrade in December that year. At this time James Lewin was drafted for military service, likely to a medical unit. After the war, he opened a practice in Berlin-Schöneberg, specializing in psychiatry and gynaecology. A second practice was opened in Berlin-Steglitz. Clara and James Lewin divorced in 1924.

=== Exile from Germany ===
As a Jewish doctor, Lewin lost his insurance licence at the end of April 1933 pursuant to the Law for the Restoration of the Professional Civil Service, and was forced to leave Germany. He initially intended to travel to Abyssinia, but decided to emigrate to France instead due to a heart condition. In December 1933, he wrote from Paris to ask the German authorities to transfer his finances.

With the help of Agro-Joint and the OZE (Obshchestvo Zdravookhraneniia Evreev, or "Jewish Healthcare Society"), Lewin was issued with a Soviet work visa on 14 February 1936, and secured a position as a senior research associate at the Scientific Research Institute of Psychiatry and Neuropathology of Vasily Kramer. He travelled to the USSR, eventually setting at Apartment 31 at 8 Medovyi Lane, Moscow. Lewin was granted Soviet citizenship on May 7, 1937.

=== Arrest and Death in the USSR ===
Agro-Joint workers and the doctors it had helped to resettle soon became targets for Stalinist purges under the so-called National Operations of the NKVD. Operational Order No. 00439, entitled "On the Arrest of German Subjects Suspected of Espionage against the USSR" was issued on July 25, 1937, and mandated the arrest of current and former German citizens who had taken up Soviet citizenship. Later in the year, the order was expanded to include other ethnic Germans suspected of collaborating or spying for Germany. Initially, 15 refugee doctors from Crimea and Chelyabinsk were arrested and accused of "collaboration with a counterrevolutionary organization". They were alleged to have received from Agro-Joint "a special assignment to organize acts of bacteriological diversion on a territory of the USSR". They were charged with participation in a counterrevolutionary terrorist organization consisting of Agro-Joint workers and doctor-microbiologists who aimed to assassinate members of the Soviet government. After these initial arrests, the NKVD of Chelyabinsk Oblast requested the arrest of colleagues of these doctors from Moscow, and transfer of all prisoners to Chelyabinsk. This included Erich Ber, Arnold Wilmer, Paul Heymann, and James Lewin (the surname is recorded as 'Levin' in the Soviet records).

According to records, the NKVD commenced proceedings against James Lewin in August and he was arrested on September 8, 1937. Following his transfer to Chelyabinsk, Lewin was found guilty on 31 December 1937, and was sentenced by the Military Collegium of the Supreme Court of the USSR to execution by gunshot, with confiscation of all his property. He was executed the same day. Lewin is probably buried in a mass grave located in the mines at Golden Mountain (Zlata Gora), where adits were used to hide the bodies of victims of NKVD operations.

During his interrogation, Lewin allegedly confessed to "anti-Soviet counter revolutionary activities, spying for the Gestapo, and the planning of terrorist attacks". Such confessions were often extracted under torture and are well known to be factually unreliable. While some corroborated details of Lewin's life and family are accurate in the interrogation records, other details are characteristically implausible. For example, while Agro-Joint records indicate that Lewin was financially involved in exotic pet businesses during his time in Paris, the minutes of interrogation would have the reader believe that Lewin - a Jewish refugee - operated an ornamental fish store merely as cover for Gestapo meetings. According to the minutes, Lewin purportedly ran a production laboratory for chemical and bacteriological weapons in his Moscow apartment.

Lewin, along with 28 other refugee doctors, was posthumously named in Germany's "List of Wanted Individuals in the USSR" (Sonderfahndungsliste UdSSR) prepared in 1941 by the Reich Security Main Office (RHSA). This publication is an equivalent to the infamous Black Book of wanted individuals drawn up for Great Britain.

On 22 June 2007 James Lewin was officially exonerated by the Russian Federation for lack of corpus delicti at his trial.

== Academic Work ==
James Lewin was an active member of the Berlin Society for Psychiatry and Nervous Diseases, where he gave several lectures.

He authored numerous psychiatric essays which are characterized by an epistemological approach. Following Alfred Erich Hoche syndrome theory, he called in his writings "to accept types of disease instead of disease units... one takes the symptoms of one engineered disease or another, without recognizing that a particular disease entity may not include them with certainty." He called for a psychopathology that "describes the phenomenological psychological structure of morbid experiences without regard to clinical evaluation. "

His publications include, among others, a monograph on Ludwig Klages' philosophy.

At the time of his move to Russia, Agro-Joint records indicate that Lewin had works in progress on the subjects of Leibniz and Kant, philosophical anthropology, and "The Basics and Problems of Phenomology and Humanities Psychology".

He remained active in his field during his short time in the USSR. On 10 October 1936, Lewin attended a meeting of the Moscow Society of Neuropathology and Psychiatry. The conference proceedings record and exchange between Lewin and fellow refugee doctor, Arthur Kronfeld.

== Notable Quotes ==
Freud would be a genius - if he were better psychologist.

== Books ==
- 1912 Die Lehre von den Ideen bei Malebranche
- 1918 Repetitorium der Psychiatrie: Ein klinischer Leitfaden für Studierende und Ärzte
- 1931 Geist und Seele: Ludwig Klages' Philosophie
