= Gesetze der Liebe =

1927 gay rights film

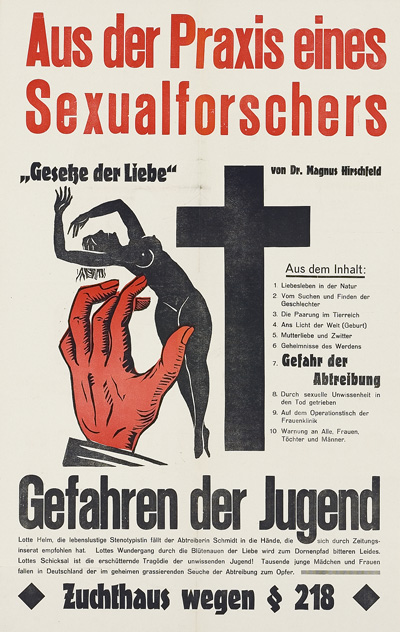
- c. 1927 poster
- Directed by: Magnus Hirschfeld; Richard Oswald (chapters 6 and 7)
- Written by: Magnus Hirschfeld
- Cinematography: Max Fassbender
- Production company: Humboldt-Film GmbH
- Release date: 16 November 1927 (Berlin)
- Country: Germany
- Language: German

Gesetze der Liebe: Aus der Mappe eines Sexualforschers (English: "Laws of Love: From the Portfolio of a Sexologist") is a 1927 film produced by Magnus Hirschfeld, a sexologist who ran the Berlin Institut für Sexualwissenschaft ("Institute for Sexual Science"), Hermann Beck and the Humboldt-Film-Gesellschaft.

Like its predecessor film from 1919, Anders als die Andern (English: "Different from the Others") – one of the first films to openly depict homosexuality – it campaigned against Paragraph 175, the provision of the German Penal Code which prohibited sex between men (sodomy law).

== Plot ==
The film is framed as a lecture in five chapters, given by Magnus Hirschfeld. Hirschfeld was a sexologist from Berlin and an early gay rights activist.

The film dealt with sexual intercourse in the animal kingdom, discussing gestation, birth, and the nurturing of newborns, before dealing with "sexual intermediates" in chapter four, a term used by Hirschfeld to refer to certain gender and sexual minorities: hermaphrodites (intersex people), transvestites (cross-dressing and transgender people) and homosexuals.

The fifth and final chapter was an abridged version of Anders als die Andern entitled Schuldlos geächtet! Tragödie eines Homosexuellen ("Innocently Outlawed! Tragedy of a Homosexual").

== Timeline of censorship ==
- 6 October 1927: The film is approved by the Film Review Office, provided it removed references to law reform (opposition to Paragraph 175).
- 12 October: At the behest of FRO chairman Ernst Seeger, the film was re-screened before a new panel of censors, who decided to totally ban the film.
- 31 October: On appeal, the previous decision to totally ban the film is reversed. The new panel ruled that the film could be shown, if accompanied with a lecture by a doctor or scientist. However, two members of this panel dissented.
- 9 November: The film is released for adult audiences only, with the segments on sexual intermediacy in chapter four removed, dealing with homosexuality along with all of chapter five.

== Legacy ==
During the few days it actually ran in Berlin, chapter 5 ("Innocently Outlawed") was not well received, even among the gay press.

However, it is this chapter which was smuggled out of Berlin and into the Soviet Union in 1928, where it played under the title Zakony Ijubvi ("Laws of Love"), now the sole version of Anders als die Andern in circulation today (the German copies being destroyed during Nazi Germany, who saw Hirschfeld's work on homosexuality as degenerate).

In 2021 a restored version of the film was released by the Munich Film Museum.
