= Die Homosexualität des Mannes und des Weibes =

1914 book by Magnus Hirschfeld

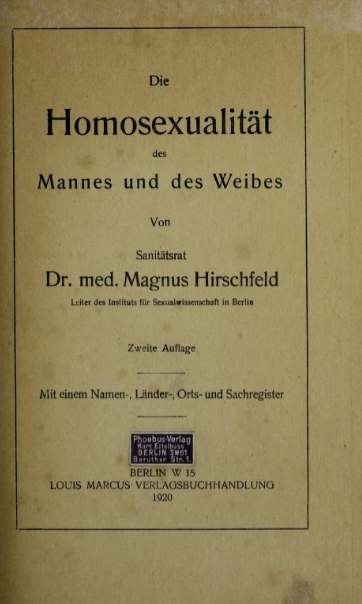
- Title page for Die Homosexualität des Mannes und des Weibes (1920)
- Author: Magnus Hirschfeld
- Original title: Die Homosexualität des Mannes und des Weibes
- Working title: The Homosexuality of Men and Women
- Translator: Michael Lombardi-Nash
- Language: German; English
- Series: Handbuch der Gesamten Sexualwissenschaft in Einzeldarstellungen (Volume 3)
- Subject: Homosexuality
- Publisher: Louis Marcus
- Publication date: 1914
- Publication place: Berlin, Germany
- Pages: 1067
- OCLC: 1390797237

Die Homosexualität des Mannes und des Weibes is a classic 1914 book on homosexuality in men and women that was written by German sexologist Magnus Hirschfeld. A second edition was published in 1920. Hirschfeld was himself gay and an occasional crossdresser, known by other Berlin crossdressers as "Aunt Magnesia". The book was part of the series Handbuch der Gesamten Sexualwissenschaft in Einzeldarstellungen and was the third volume of this series. Die Homosexualität des Mannes und des Weibes was not translated until 2000, under the title The Homosexuality of Men and Women by Michael Lombardi-Nash. It has been said that the book was the most significant and authoritative text on homosexuality of its time. The book has often been overlooked in the English-speaking academia.

== See also ==
- Die Transvestiten: Eine Untersuchung über den Erotischen Verkleidungstrieb (Hirschfeld, 1910)
