= Arthur Kronfeld =

German psychiatrist (1886–1941)

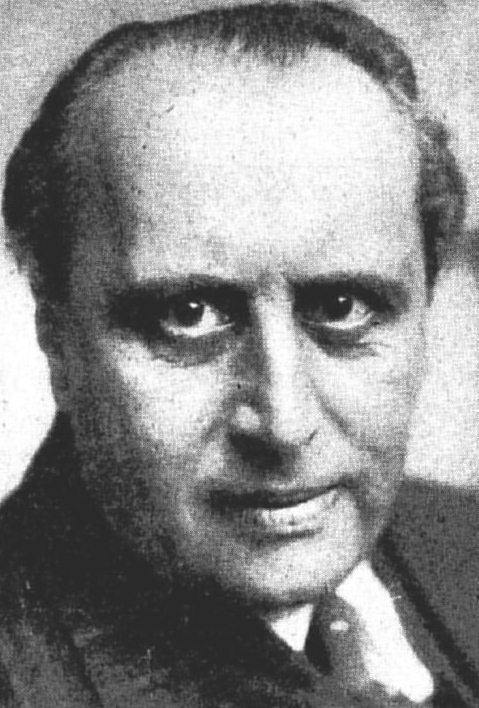
- Prof. Arthur Kronfeld, 1932.
- Born: January 9, 1886; Berlin, German Empire
- Died: October 16, 1941 (aged 55); Moscow, Soviet Union
- Scientific career
- Fields: Psychology
- Institutions: University of Berlin

Arthur Kronfeld (January 9, 1886 – October 16, 1941) was a German psychiatrist of Jewish origin, and eventually a professor at the University of Berlin. His sister Maria Dronke found fame as an actor in New Zealand. Later in life, Kronfeld took up an important position in Moscow. On 10 October 1936, an exchange between Kronfeld and fellow exiled German-Jewish psychiatrist, James Lewin, was recorded in the proceedings of a meeting of the Moscow Society of Neuropathology and Psychiatry.

In 1941, he wrote the pamphlet "Degenerates in Power", in which he made psychiatric diagnoses for Hitler and his associates, and also participated in anti-fascist programs on Moscow radio. It is believed Kronfeld and his wife committed suicide at the approach of German troops. However, there is some controversy on exactly how they died.

== Works ==
=== Books ===
- 1906 Sexuality and aesthetic feeling in their genetic connection. A study. Singer, Strasbourg and Leipzig
- 1912 About the psychological theories of Freud and related opinions - Systematics and critical discussion. Engelman, Leipzig (Russ. Transl.: Moscow 1913)
- 1920 The nature of psychiatric realization. Contributions to General Psychiatry. Springer, Berlin
- 1923 Sexualpsychopathologie
- 1924 Hypnosis and Suggestion. Ullstein, Berlin (row: Ways to the knowledge Nr.11; Transl.: Leningrad 1925, Moscow 1927; Prague 1931; Tallinn 1991)
- 1924 Psychotherapy - Characterology, Psychoanalysis, Hypnose, Psychagogik. Springer, Berlin (2. impr. and enl. Edition 1925)
- 1927 Psychology in Psychiatry - An introduction to the psychological realization ways within the psychiatry and their position for clinical-pathological research. Springer, Berlin (Habilitation thesis; engl. 1936);
- 1930 Perspectives of Psychiatry. Thieme, Leipzig
- 1932 Textbook of Characterology. Springer, Berlin
- 1932 with S. Wronsky (and collaboration of Rolf Reiner): Social therapy and Psychotherapy in the methods of the welfare service. Heymann, Berlin
- 1941 Degenerates in power, Moscow and Krasnojarsk; with the title: The bloody gang of the degenerated also Swerdlowsk 1942. - Reprint Moscow 1993. Дегенераты у власти, под редакцией Лучано Мекаччи и Александра Эткинда, ЭКСМО, Москва, 2023. ISBN 978-5-04-188773-5 (A. Kronfeld, Degenerates in power, edited by L. Mecacci and A. Etkind, EKSMO, Moscow, 2023).Degenerati al potere, a cura di Luciano Mecacci, prefazione di Aleksandr Etkind, Bollati Boringhieri, Torino, 2026 (ISBN 978-88-339-4645-0).

=== Editorship ===
- 1922-1927 Kleine Schriften zur Seelenforschung (Small writings for soul research). Puettmann, Stuttgart (briefly carried on with the title Writings for soul research by Carl Schneider in 1928)
- 1934-36/37 with Wilhelm Stekel: Psychotherapeutische Praxis (Psychotherapeutic practice - quarterly for practical medical Psychotherapy) Weidmann, Vienna
