= Magnus Hirschfeld =

German sexologist (1868–1935)

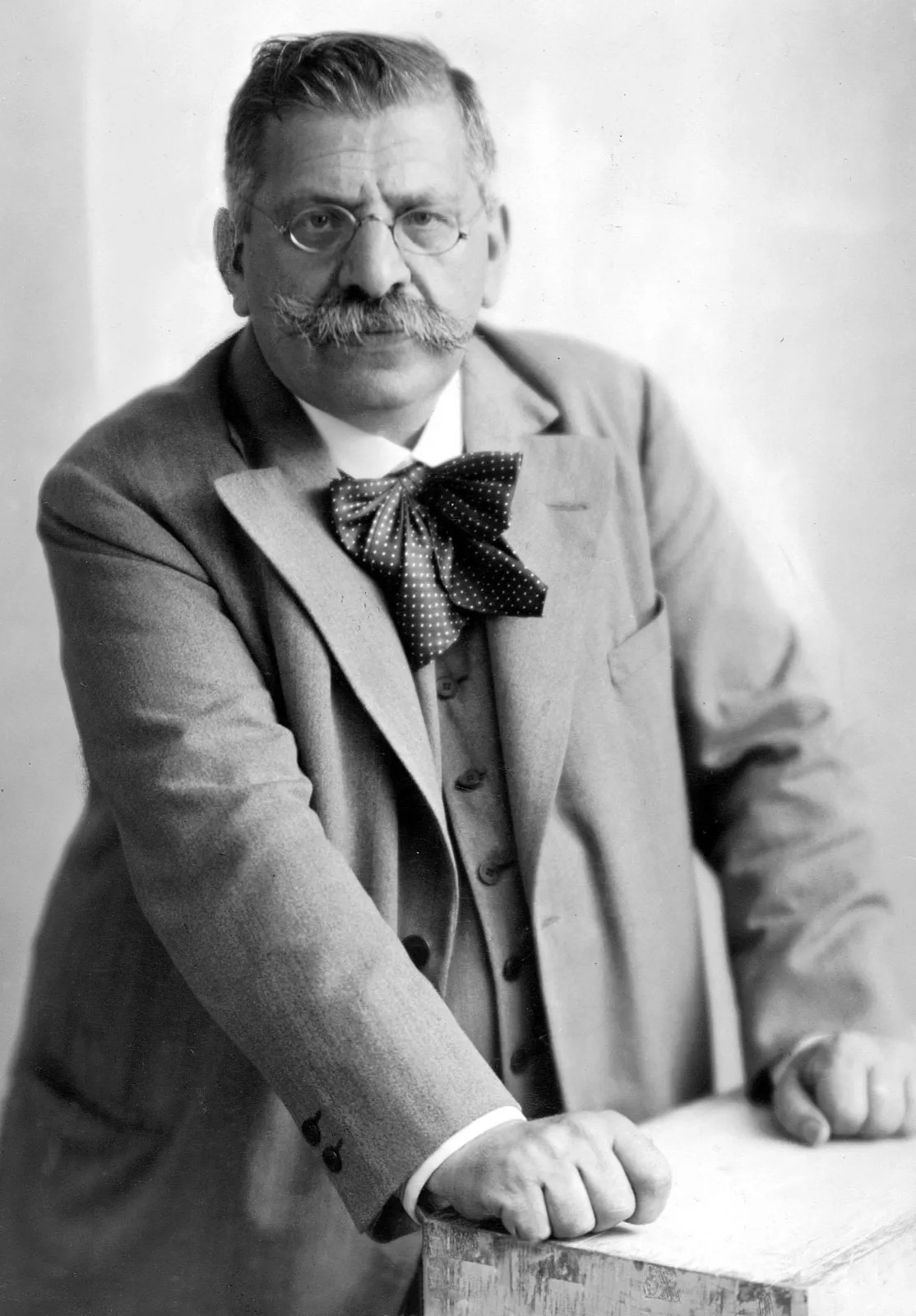
- Hirschfeld in 1928
- Born: 14 May 1868; Kolberg, Pomerania, Prussia
- Died: 14 May 1935 (aged 67); Nice, France
- Resting place: Body cremated; ashes interred in Caucade Cemetery, Nice
- Known for: Pioneering sexology Advocating for LGBTQ rights
- Partners: Karl Giese; Li Shiu Tong
- Medical career
- Field: Sexology
- Institutions: Institut für Sexualwissenschaft

Magnus Hirschfeld (14 May 1868 – 14 May 1935) was a German physician, sexologist, and LGBTQ advocate. Hirschfeld is regarded as one of the most influential 20th-century sexologists.

Hirschfeld was educated in philosophy, philology, and medicine. An outspoken advocate for sexual minorities, he founded the Scientific-Humanitarian Committee and the World League for Sexual Reform. During the 1920s he based his practice in Berlin-Charlottenburg. His Committee carried out "the first advocacy for homosexual and transgender rights".

He was targeted by early fascists, and later by the Nazis, for being Jewish and gay. He was beaten by völkisch activists in 1920, and in 1933 his Institut für Sexualwissenschaft was looted and its books burned by Nazis. His German citizenship was revoked in 1933 by the Nazi government due to his advocacy. He was forced into exile in France, where he died in 1935.

== Early life ==
Hirschfeld was born in Kolberg in Pomerania (since 1945 Kołobrzeg in Poland), to an Ashkenazi Jewish family, the son of highly regarded physician and Senior Medical Officer Hermann Hirschfeld. As a youth he attended Kolberg Cathedral School, which at the time was a Protestant school. In 1887–1888, he studied comparative linguistics in Breslau, but decided to transfer to the University of Strasbourg (then named the Kaiser-Wilhelm-Universität) to study medicine and natural sciences in 1889. He left the Strasbourg for the Friedrich Wilhelm University of Berlin in 1890, where he continued his studies for a year before transferring to the Ludwig-Maximilians-Universität München in 1891. Hirschfeld left Munich later that same year to complete his state mandated military service in Heidelberg, continuing his medical studies at Heidelberg University in his spare time. At the end of 1891, Hirschfeld completed his service and returned to Berlin to write his medical thesis on the effects of influenza on the nervous system, with Rudolf Virchow and Emil Heinrich du Bois-Reymond serving as his oral examiners. In 1892, he received his medical degree.

After his studies, Hirschfeld spent the next two years traveling the world, giving lectures and writing articles. He spent time in the major cities of France, Algeria, Morocco, Italy, and the United States. During his eight-month stay in the United States, Hirschfeld traveled to Chicago to document the World's Columbian Exposition for a German newspaper. He became fascinated by the city's homosexual subculture, struck by its similarities to the homosexual subculture of Berlin. As a result, Hirschfeld began to develop his theory about the universality of homosexuality around the world; he researched in books and newspaper articles about the existence of gay subcultures in Rio de Janeiro, Tangier, and Tokyo, all of which shared many of the same cultural similarities.

Hirschfeld returned to Germany in 1894 and opened a naturopathic practice in Magdeburg, where he would develop his lifelong commitment to homosexual rights advocacy. He was struck by the number of his gay patients who had Suizidalnarben ('scars left by suicide attempts'), and often found himself trying to give his patients a reason to live. Hirschfeld was also deeply affected by the 1895 trial of Oscar Wilde, to which he made frequent reference in his writings. In 1896, he had one of the most formative experiences of his career; In 1896, a young lieutenant whom Hirschfeld was treating for severe depression took his own life. In the German language, the word for suicide is Selbstmord ('self-murder'), which carried more judgmental and condemnatory connotations than its English language equivalent, making the subject of suicide a taboo in 19th century Germany. The lieutenant addressed his suicide note to Hirschfeld, wherein he wrote that despite his best efforts, he could not end his desires for other men, and so had ended his life out of his guilt and shame. He explained that he lacked the "strength" to tell his parents the "truth", and spoke of his shame of "that which nearly strangled my heart". The officer could not even bring himself to use the word "homosexuality", which he instead conspicuously referred to as "that" in his note. The note closes with the words, "The thought that you [Hirschfeld] could contribute a future when the German fatherland will think of us in more just terms sweetens the hour of my death." Hirschfeld had been treating the officer from 1895 to 1896, and the use of the term "us" led to speculation that a relationship existed between the two. However, the officer's use of Sie, the formal German word for you, instead of the informal du, suggests Hirschfeld's relationship with his patient was strictly professional. Hirschfeld would go on to repeatedly cite this incident as the catalyst for his career as a sexologist and gay rights activist.

In 1896, he moved his practice to Berlin-Charlottenburg to pursue this passion and soon published his first work on the subject of homosexuality under the pseudonym Th. Ramien entitled, Sappho und Socrates: Wie erklärt sich die Liebe der Männer und Frauen zu Personen des eigenen Geschlechts? (Sappho and Socrates: How does one explain the love of men and women to persons of their own gender?). The pamphlet argues that homosexuality is a biological, naturally occurring phenomenon which should not be criminalized, quoting the words of Friedrich Nietzsche: "What is natural can not be immoral."

== Sexual rights activism ==
=== Scientific-Humanitarian Committee ===
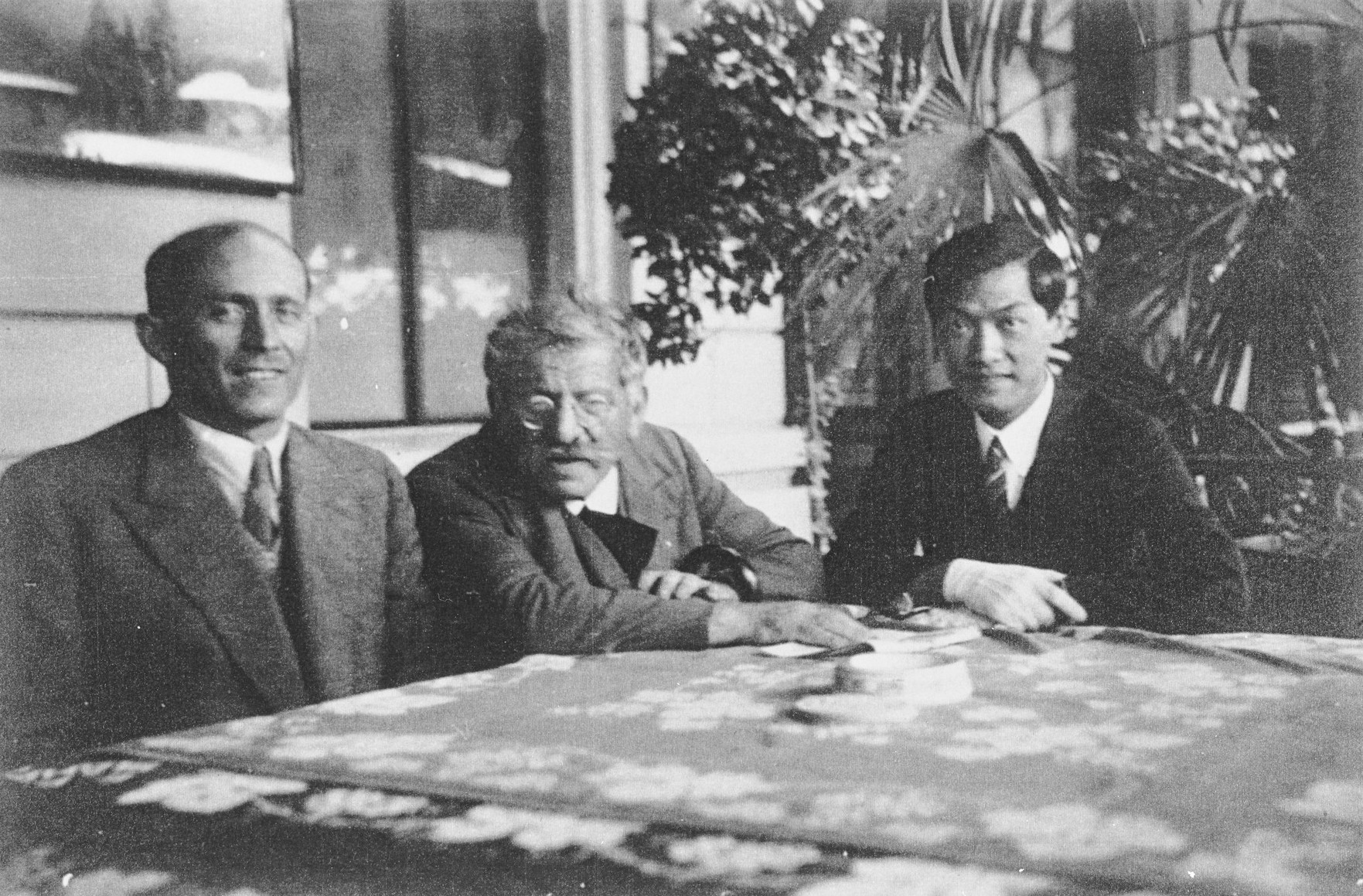
Hirschfeld (center) with Bernhard Schapiro and Li Shiu Tong (also known as Tao Li), c. 1930

Magnus Hirschfeld found a balance between practicing medicine and writing about his findings. Between 1 May and 15 October 1896, the Große Berliner Gewerbeausstellung ('Great Business Exhibition of Berlin') took place, which featured nine "human zoos" where people from Germany's colonies in New Guinea and Africa were put on display for the visitors to gawk at. Such exhibitions of colonised peoples were common at industrial fairs, and later after Qingdao, the Mariana Islands, and the Caroline Islands became part of the German empire, Chinese, Chamorros, and Micronesians joined the Africans and New Guineans displayed in the "human zoos". Hirschfeld, who was keenly interested in sexuality in other cultures, visited the Große Berliner Gewerbeausstellung and subsequently other exhibitions to inquire of the people in the "human zoos" via interpreters about the status of sexuality in their cultures. It was in 1896, after talking to the people displayed in the "human zoos" at the Große Berliner Gewerbeausstellung, that Hirschfeld began writing what became his 1914 book Die Homosexualität des Mannes und des Weibes (The Homosexuality of Men and Women), an attempt to comprehensively survey homosexuality around the world, as part of an effort to prove that homosexuality occurred in every culture. In the book, Hirschfeld found that many homosexuals considered England to be the country with the highest rate of homosexuality. In addition to his book on homosexuality, Hirschfeld wrote a book on transvestism in 1910 known as Die Transvestiten: Eine Untersuchung über den Erotischen Verkleidungstrieb (Transvestites: The Erotic Drive to Cross-Dress).

In 1897, Hirschfeld founded the Scientific-Humanitarian Committee with the publisher Max Spohr (1850–1905), the lawyer Eduard Oberg (1858–1917), and the writer Franz Joseph von Bülow (1861–1915). The group aimed to undertake research to defend the rights of homosexuals and to repeal Paragraph 175, the section of the German penal code that, since 1871, had criminalized homosexuality. They argued that the law encouraged blackmail. The motto of the committee, "Justice through science", reflected Hirschfeld's belief that a better scientific understanding of homosexuality would eliminate social hostility toward homosexuals.

Within the group, some of the members rejected Hirschfeld's theory of sexual intermediaries, which conceptualized all traits of sex, gender, and sexual orientation on a spectrum which ranged from masculine to feminine. Offended by the notion of being associated with gender non-conformity, Benedict Friedlaender and some others left the Scientific-Humanitarian Committee to form the Bund für männliche Kultur or 'Union for Male Culture', which argued that male–male love is a demonstration of virile manliness similar to that of the classical Greek tradition. Under Hirschfeld's leadership, the Scientific-Humanitarian Committee gathered 6000 signatures from prominent Germans on a petition to overturn Paragraph 175. Signatories included Albert Einstein, Hermann Hesse, Käthe Kollwitz, Thomas Mann, Heinrich Mann, Rainer Maria Rilke, August Bebel, Max Brod, Karl Kautsky, Stefan Zweig, Gerhart Hauptmann, Martin Buber, Richard von Krafft-Ebing, Eduard Bernstein, and even Emile Zola and Leo Tolstoy. The bill was brought before the Reichstag in 1898, but was supported only by a minority from the Social Democratic Party of Germany. August Bebel, a friend of Hirschfeld from his university days, agreed to sponsor the attempt to repeal Paragraph 175.

Hirschfeld considered what would, in a later era, be described as "outing": forcing out of the closet some of the prominent and secretly homosexual lawmakers who had remained silent on the bill. He arranged for the bill to be reintroduced and, in the 1920s, it made some progress until the takeover of the Nazi Party ended all hope for any such reform. As part of his efforts to counter popular prejudice, Hirschfeld spoke out about the taboo subject of suicide and was the first to present statistical evidence that homosexuals were more likely to commit suicide or attempt suicide than heterosexuals. Hirschfeld prepared questionnaires that gay men could answer anonymously about homosexuality and suicide. Collating his results, Hirschfeld estimated that 3 out of every 100 gays committed suicide every year, that a quarter of gays had attempted suicide at some point in their lives and that the other three-quarters had had suicidal thoughts at some point. He used his evidence to argue that, under current social conditions in Germany, life was literally unbearable for homosexuals.

A figure frequently mentioned by Hirschfeld to illustrate the "hell experienced by homosexuals" was Oscar Wilde, who was a well-known author in Germany, and whose trials in 1895 had been extensively covered by the German press. Hirschfeld visited Cambridge University in 1905 to meet Wilde's son, Vyvyan Holland, who had changed his surname to avoid being associated with his father. Hirschfeld noted "the name Wilde" has, since his trial, sounded like "an indecent word, which causes homosexuals to blush with shame, women to avert their eyes, and normal men to be outraged". During his visit to Britain, Hirschfeld was invited to a secret ceremony in the English countryside where a "group of beautiful, young, male students" from Cambridge gathered together wearing Wilde's prison number, C33, as a way of symbolically linking his fate to theirs, to read out aloud Wilde's poem "The Ballad of Reading Gaol". Hirschfeld found the poem reading to be heartwrenching (markerschütternd), going on to write that the ceremony was "the most earth-shattering outcry that has ever been voiced by a downtrodden soul about its own torture and that of humanity". By the end of the reading of "The Ballad of Reading Gaol", Hirschfeld felt "quiet joy" as he was convinced that, despite the way that Wilde's life had been ruined, something good would eventually come of it.

==== Feminism ====
In 1905, Hirschfeld joined the Bund für Mutterschutz ('League for the Protection of Mothers'), the feminist organization founded by Helene Stöcker. He campaigned for the decriminalisation of abortion, and against policies that banned female teachers and civil servants from marrying or having children. Both Hirschfeld and Stöcker believed that there was a close connection between the causes of gay rights and women's rights, and Stöcker was much involved in the campaign to repeal Paragraph 175 while Hirschfeld campaigned for the repeal of Paragraph 218, which had banned abortion. From 1909 to 1912, Stöcker, Hirschfeld, Hedwig Dohm, and others successfully campaigned against an extension to Paragraph 175 which would have criminalised female homosexuality.

In 1906, Hirschfeld was asked as a doctor to examine a prisoner in Neumünster to see if he was suffering from "severe nervous disturbances caused by a combination of malaria, blackwater fever, and congenital sexual anomaly". The man, a former soldier and a veteran of what Hirschfeld called the Hereroaufstand ('Herero revolt') in German South West Africa (modern Namibia) appeared to be suffering from what would now be considered post-traumatic stress disorder, saying that he had done terrible things in Southwest Africa, and could no longer live with himself. In 1904, the Herero and Nama peoples who had been steadily pushed off their land to make way for German settlers, had revolted, causing Kaiser Wilhelm II to dispatch General Lothar von Trotha to wage a "war of annihilation" to exterminate the Herero and Nama in what has since become known as the Herero and Nama genocide. The genocide came to widespread attention when the SPD leader August Bebel criticized the government on the floor of the Reichstag, saying the government did not have the right to exterminate the Herero just because they were Black. Hirschfeld did not mention his diagnosis of the prisoner, nor he did mention in detail the source of the prisoner's guilt about his actions in Southwest Africa; the German scholar Heike Bauer criticized him for his seeming unwillingness to see the connection between the Herero genocide and the prisoner's guilt, which had caused him to engage in a petty crime wave.

Hirschfeld's position, that homosexuality was normal and natural, made him a highly controversial figure at the time, involving him in vigorous debates with other academics, who regarded homosexuality as unnatural and wrong. One of Hirschfeld's leading critics was Austrian Baron Christian von Ehrenfels, who advocated radical changes to society and sexuality to combat the supposed "Yellow Peril", and saw Hirschfeld's theories as a challenge to his view of sexuality. Ehrenfels argued that there were a few "biologically degenerate" homosexuals who lured otherwise "healthy boys" into their lifestyle, making homosexuality into both a choice and a wrong one at that time.

==== African anthropology ====
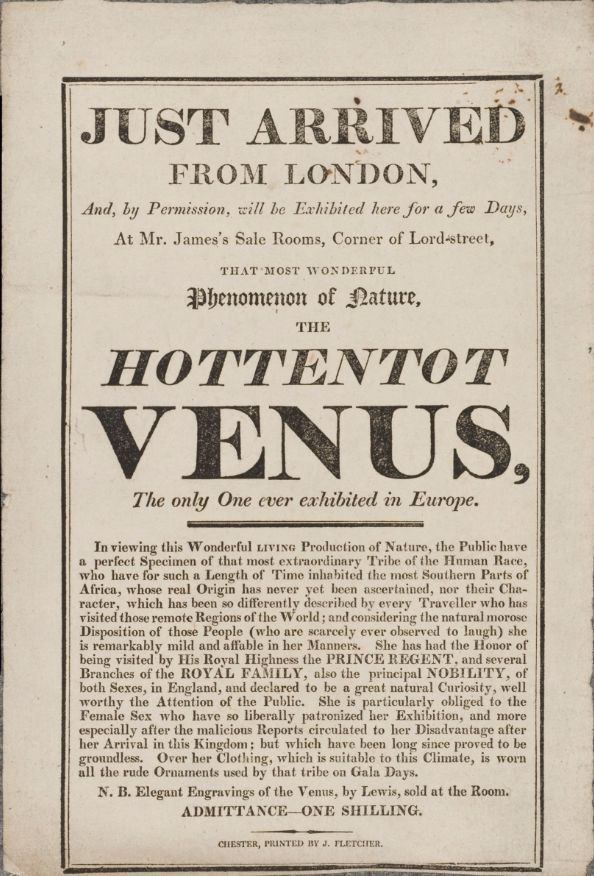
Poster advertising Sarah Baartman

At the same time, Hirschfeld became involved in a debate with a number of anthropologists about the supposed existence of the Hottentottenschürze ('Hottentot apron'), namely the belief that the Khoekoe (known to Westerners as Hottentots) women of southern Africa had abnormally enlarged labia, which made them inclined toward lesbianism. Hirschfeld argued there was no evidence that the Khoekoe women had abnormally large labia, whose supposed existence had fascinated so many Western anthropologists at the time, and that, other than being Black, the bodies of Khoekoe women were no different from German women. One Khoekoe woman, Sarah Baartman, the "Hottentot Venus", did have relatively large buttocks and labia, compared to Northern European women, and had been exhibited at a freak show in Europe in the early 19th century, which was the origin of this belief about the Khoekhoe women. Hirschfeld wrote: "The differences appear minimal compared to what is shared" between Khoekoe and German women.

Hirschfeld argued that, if same-sex relationships were common among Khoekoe women, and if the bodies of Khoekoe women were essentially the same as Western women, then Western women must have the same tendencies. Hirschfeld's theories about a spectrum of sexuality existing in all of the world's cultures implicitly undercut the binary theories about the differences between various races that was the basis of the claim of white supremacy. However, Bauer wrote that Hirschfeld's theories about the universality of homosexuality paid little attention to cultural contexts, and criticized him for his remarks that Hausa women in Nigeria were well known for their lesbian tendencies and would have been executed for their sapphic acts before British rule, as assuming that imperialism was always good for the colonized.

=== Eulenburg affair ===
Hirschfeld played a prominent role in the Harden–Eulenburg affair of 1906–09, which became the most widely publicized sex scandal in Imperial Germany. During the libel trial in 1907, when General Kuno von Moltke sued the journalist Maximilian Harden, after the latter had run an article accusing Moltke of having a homosexual relationship with the politically powerful Prince Philipp von Eulenburg, who was the Kaiser's best friend, Hirschfeld testified for Harden. In his role as an expert witness, Hirschfeld testified that Moltke was gay and, thus, what Harden had written was true. Hirschfeld – who wanted to make homosexuality legal in Germany – believed that proving Army officers like Moltke were gay would help his case for legalization. He also testified that he believed there was nothing wrong with Moltke.

Most notably, Hirschfeld testified that "homosexuality was part of the plan of nature and creation just like normal love." Hirschfeld's testimony caused outrage all over Germany. The Vossische Zeitung newspaper condemned Hirschfeld in an editorial as "a freak who acted for freaks in the name of pseudoscience". The Münchener Neuesten Nachrichten newspaper declared in an editorial: "Dr. Hirschfeld makes public propaganda under the cover of science, which does nothing but poison our people. Real science should fight against this!" A notable witness at the trial was Lilly von Elbe, former wife of Moltke, who testified that her husband had only had sex with her twice in their entire marriage. Elbe spoke with remarkable openness for the period of her sexual desires and her frustration with a husband who was only interested in having sex with Eulenburg. Elbe's testimony was marked by moments of low comedy when it emerged that she had taken to attacking Moltke with a frying pan in vain attempts to make him have sex with her. The fact that General von Moltke was unable to defend himself from his wife's attacks was taken as proof that he was deficient in his masculinity, which many saw as confirming his homosexuality. At the time, the subject of female sexuality was taboo, and Elbe's testimony was controversial, with many saying that Elbe must be mentally ill because of her willingness to acknowledge her sexuality. Letters to the newspapers at the time, from both men and women, overwhelmingly condemned Elbe for her "disgusting" testimony concerning her sexuality. As an expert witness, Hirschfeld also testified that female sexuality was natural, and Elbe was just a normal woman who was in no way mentally ill. After the jury ruled in favor of Harden, Judge Hugo Isenbiel was enraged by the jury's decision, which he saw as expressing approval for Hirschfeld. He overturned the verdict under the grounds that homosexuals "have the morals of dogs", and insisted that this verdict could not be allowed to stand.

After the verdict was overturned, a second trial found Harden guilty of libel. At the second trial, Hirschfeld again testified as an expert witness, but this time, he was much less certain than he had been at the first trial about Moltke's homosexuality. Hirschfeld testified that Moltke and Eulenburg had an "intimate" friendship that was homoerotic in nature but not sexual, as he had testified at the first trial. Hirschfeld also testified that, though he still believed female sexuality was normal, Elbe was suffering from hysteria caused by a lack of sex, and so the court should discount her stories about a sexual relationship between Moltke and Eulenburg. Hirschfeld had been threatened by the Prussian government with having his medical license revoked if he testified as an expert witness again along the same lines that he had at the first trial, and possibly prosecuted for violating Paragraph 175. The trial was a libel suit against Harden by Moltke, but much of the testimony had concerned Eulenburg, whose status as the best friend of Wilhelm II meant that the scandal threatened to involve the Kaiser. Moreover, far from precipitating increased tolerance as Hirschfeld had expected, the scandal led to a major homophobic and anti-Semitic backlash, and Hirschfeld's biographer Elena Mancini speculated that Hirschfeld wanted to bring to an end an affair that was hindering rather helping the cause for gay rights.

Because Eulenburg was a prominent anti-Semite and Hirschfeld was a Jew, during the affair, the völkisch movement came out in support of Eulenburg, whom they portrayed as an Aryan heterosexual, framed by false allegations of homosexuality by Hirschfeld and Harden. Various völkisch leaders, most notably the radical anti-Semitic journalist Theodor Fritsch, used the Eulenburg affair as a chance to "settle the accounts" with the Jews. As a gay Jew, Hirschfeld was relentlessly vilified by the völkisch newspapers. Outside Hirschfeld's house in Berlin, posters were affixed by völkisch activists, which read "Dr. Hirschfeld A Public Danger: The Jews are Our Undoing!". In Nazi Germany, the official interpretation of the Eulenburg affair was that Eulenburg was a straight Aryan whose career was destroyed by false claims of being gay by Jews like Hirschfeld. After the scandal had ended, Hirschfeld concluded that, far from helping the gay rights movement as he had hoped, the ensuing backlash set the movement back. The conclusion drawn by the German government was the opposite of the one that Hirschfeld wanted; the fact that prominent men like General von Moltke and Eulenburg were gay did not lead the government to repeal Paragraph 175 as Hirschfeld had hoped and, instead, the government decided that Paragraph 175 was being enforced with insufficient vigor, leading to a crackdown on homosexuals that was unprecedented and would not be exceeded until the Nazi era.

=== World War I ===
In 1914, Hirschfeld was swept up by the national enthusiasm of the Spirit of 1914, as the sense of national solidarity was known that at the outbreak of World War I rallied the majority of Germans to the defence of the Fatherland. Initially pro-war, Hirschfeld started to turn against the war in 1915, moving toward a pacifist position. In his 1915 pamphlet, Warum Hassen uns die Völker? ('Why do other nations hate us?'), Hirschfeld answered his own question by arguing that it was the greatness of Germany that excited envy from other nations, especially Great Britain, and so had supposedly caused them to come together to destroy the Reich. Hirschfeld accused Britain of starting the war in 1914 "out of envy at the development and size of the German Empire". Warum Hassen uns die Völker? was characterized by a chauvinist and ultra-nationalist tone, together with a crass Anglophobia that has often embarrassed Hirschfeld's modern admirers such as Charlotte Wolff, who called the pamphlet a "perversion of the values which Hirschfeld had always stood for".

As a Jewish homosexual, Hirschfeld was acutely aware that many Germans did not consider him to be a "proper" German, or even a German at all; so, he reasoned that taking an ultra-patriotic stance might break down prejudices by showing that German Jews or homosexuals could also be good, patriotic Germans, rallying to the cry of the Fatherland. By 1916, Hirschfeld was writing pacifist pamphlets, calling for an immediate end to the war. In his 1916 pamphlet Kriegspsychologisches ('The Psychology of War'), Hirschfeld was far more critical of the war than he had been in 1915, emphasizing the suffering and trauma caused by it. He also expressed the opinion that nobody wanted to take responsibility for the war because its horrors were "superhuman in size". He declared that "it is not enough that the war ends with peace; it must end with reconciliation". In late 1918, Hirschfeld together with his sister, Franziska Mann, co-wrote a pamphlet Was jede Frau vom Wahlrecht wissen muß! ('What every woman needs to know about the right to vote!') hailing the November Revolution for granting German women the right to vote and announced the "eyes of the world are now resting on German women".

=== Interwar period ===
In 1920, Hirschfeld was badly beaten by a group of völkisch activists who attacked him on the street; he was initially declared dead when the police arrived. In 1921, Hirschfeld organized the First Congress for Sexual Reform, which led to the formation of the World League for Sexual Reform. Congresses were held in Copenhagen (1928), London (1929), Vienna (1930), and Brno (1932).

Conrad Veidt and Hirschfeld as Paul Körner and the Doctor in Different from the Others

Hirschfeld was both quoted and caricatured in the press as a vociferous expert on sexual matters; during his 1931 tour of the United States, the Hearst newspaper chain dubbed him "the Einstein of Sex". He identified as a campaigner and a scientist, investigating and cataloging many varieties of sexuality, not just homosexuality. He developed a system which categorised 64 possible types of sexual intermediary, ranging from masculine, heterosexual male to feminine, homosexual male, including those he described under the term transvestite (German: Transvestit), which he coined in 1910, and those he described under the term transsexuals, a term he coined in 1923. He also made a distinction between transsexualism and intersexuality. At this time, Hirschfeld and the Institute for Sexual Sciences issued a number of transvestite passes to trans people in order to prevent them from being harassed by the police.

=== Anders als die Andern ===
Hirschfeld co-wrote and acted in the 1919 film Anders als die Andern ('Different From the Others'), in which Conrad Veidt played one of the first homosexual characters ever written for cinema. The film had a specific gay rights law reform agenda; after Veidt's character is blackmailed by a male prostitute, he eventually comes out rather than continuing to make the blackmail payments. His career is destroyed and he is driven to suicide. Hirschfeld played himself in Anders als die Andern, where the title cards have him say: "The persecution of homosexuals belongs to the same sad chapter of history in which the persecutions of witches and heretics is inscribed... Only with the French Revolution did a complete change come about. Everywhere where the Code Napoléon was introduced, the laws against homosexuals were repealed, for they were considered a violation of the rights of the individual... In Germany, however, despite more than fifty years of scientific research, legal discrimination against homosexuals continues unabated... May justice soon prevail over injustice in this area, science conquer superstition, love achieve victory over hatred!"

In May 1919, when the film premiered in Berlin, the First World War was still a very fresh memory and German conservatives, who already hated Hirschfeld, seized upon his Francophile speech in the film praising France for legalizing homosexuality in 1792 as evidence that gay rights were "un-German". At the end of the film, when the protagonist Paul Körner commits suicide, his lover Kurt is planning on killing himself, when Hirschfeld appears to tell him: "If you want to honor the memory of your dead friend, you must not take your own life, but instead preserve it to change the prejudices whose victim – one of the countless many – this dead man was. That is the task of the living I assign you. Just as Zola struggled on behalf of a man who innocently languished in prison, what matters now is to restore honor and justice to the many thousands before us, with us, and after us. Through knowledge to justice!" The reference to Émile Zola's role in the Dreyfus affair was intended to draw a parallel between homophobia and anti-Semitism, while Hirschfeld's repeated use of the word "us" was an implied admission of his own homosexuality. The anti-suicide message of Anders als die Andern reflected Hirschfeld's interest in the subject of the high suicide rate among homosexuals, and was intended to give hope to gay audiences. The film ends with Hirschfeld opening a copy of the penal code of the Reich and striking out Paragraph 175 with a giant X.

== Institut für Sexualwissenschaft ==
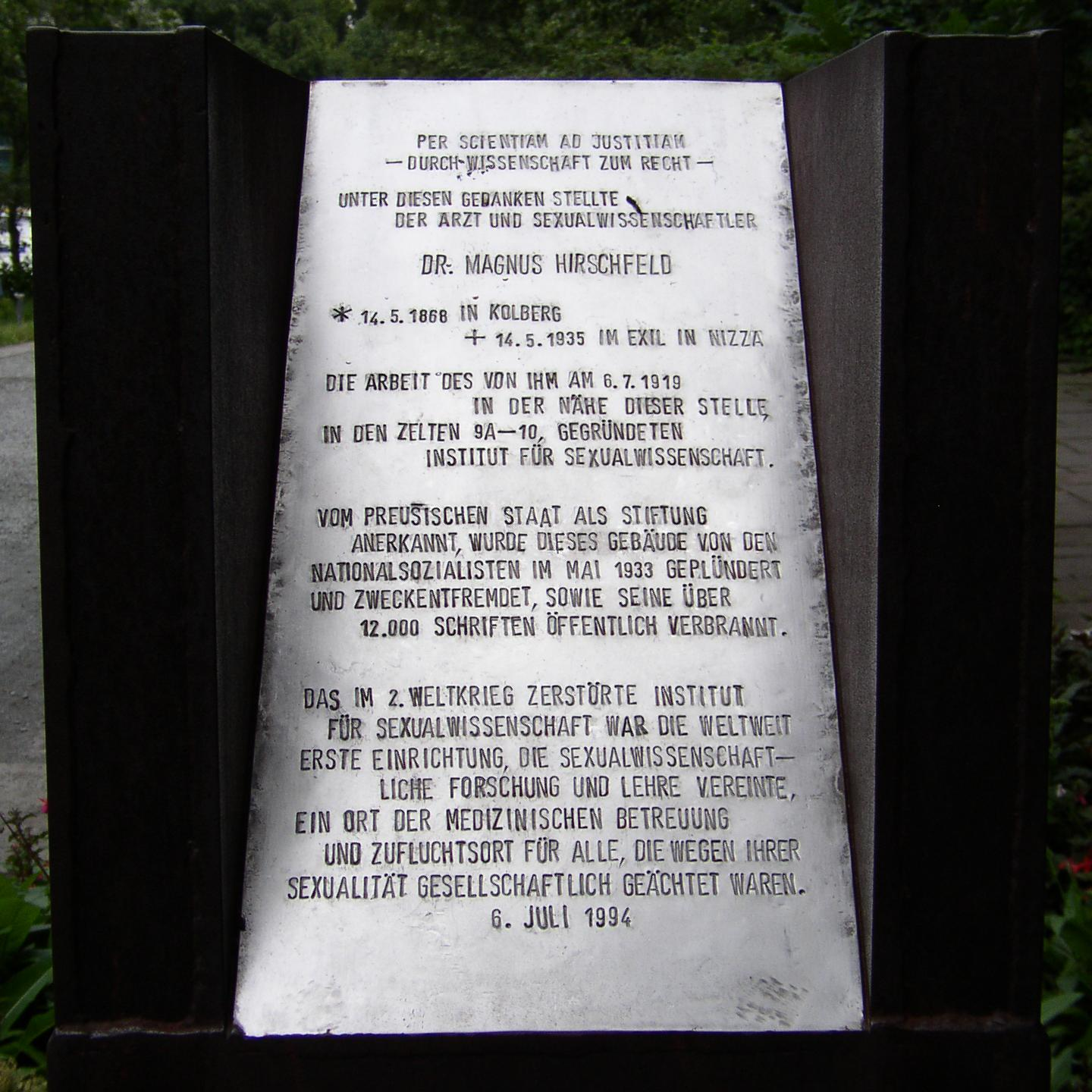
Memorial plaque in Berlin-Tiergarten

Under the more liberal atmosphere of the newly founded Weimar Republic, Hirschfeld purchased a villa not far from the Reichstag building in Berlin for his new Institut für Sexualwissenschaft ('Institute of Sexual Research'), which opened on 6 July 1919. In Germany, the Reich government made laws, but the Länder governments enforced the laws, meaning it was up to the Länder governments to enforce Paragraph 175. Until the November Revolution of 1918, Prussia had a three-class voting system that effectively disenfranchised most ordinary people, and allowed the Junkers to dominate Prussia. After the November Revolution, universal suffrage came to Prussia, which became a stronghold of the Social Democrats. The SPD believed in repealing Paragraph 175, and the Social Democratic Prussian government headed by Otto Braun ordered the Prussian police not to enforce Paragraph 175, making Prussia into a haven for homosexuals all over Germany. The Institute housed Hirschfeld's immense archives and library on sexuality and provided educational services and medical consultations; the clinical staff included psychiatrists Felix Abraham and Arthur Kronfeld, gynecologist Ludwig Levy-Lenz, dermatologist and endocrinologist Bernard Schapiro, and dermatologist Friedrich Wertheim. The institute also housed the Museum of Sex, an educational resource for the public, which is reported to have been visited by school classes. Hirschfeld himself lived at the Institution on the second floor with his partner, Karl Giese, together with his sister Recha Tobias (1857–1942).

Giese and Hirschfeld were a well-known couple in the gay scene in Berlin where Hirschfeld was popularly known as Tante Magnesia. Tante ('aunt') was a German slang expression for a gay man but did not mean, as some claim, that Hirschfeld himself cross-dressed. People from around Europe and beyond came to the institute to gain a clearer understanding of their sexuality. Christopher Isherwood writes about his and W. H. Auden's visit in his book Christopher and His Kind; they were calling on Francis Turville-Petre, a friend of Isherwood's who was an active member of the Scientific Humanitarian Committee. Other celebrated visitors included German novelist and playwright Gerhart Hauptmann, German artist Christian Schad, French writers René Crevel and André Gide, Russian director Sergei Eisenstein, and American poet Elsa Gidlow.

In addition, a number of noted individuals lived for longer or shorter periods of time in the various rooms available for rent or as free accommodations in the Institute complex. Among the residents were Isherwood and Turville-Petre; literary critic and philosopher Walter Benjamin; actress and dancer Anita Berber; Marxist philosopher Ernst Bloch; Willi Münzenberg, a member of the German Parliament and a press officer for the Communist Party of Germany; Dora Richter, one of the first transgender patients to receive sex reassignment surgery at the institute, and Lili Elbe. Richter had been previously arrested for cross-dressing and discharged from the military. At the suggestion of a close friend, she later came to the institute for help. Hirschfeld had coined the term transvestite in 1910 to describe what today would be called transgender people, and the institution became a haven for transgender people, where Hirschfeld offered them shelter from abuse, performed surgeries, and gave otherwise unemployable transgender people jobs, albeit of a menial type, mostly as "maids".

The Institute and Hirschfeld's work are depicted in Rosa von Praunheim's feature film Der Einstein des Sex (The Einstein of Sex, Germany, 1999; English subtitled version available). Although inspired by Hirschfeld's life, the film is fictional. It contains invented characters and incidents and attributes motives and sentiments to Hirschfeld and others on the basis of little or no historical evidence. Hirschfeld biographer Ralf Dose notes, for instance, that "the figure of 'Dorchen' in Rosa von Praunheim's film The Einstein of Sex is complete fiction."

== World tour ==
In March 1930, the Social Democratic chancellor Hermann Müller was overthrown by the intrigues of General Kurt von Schleicher. "Presidential" governments, responsible only to the President Paul von Hindenburg, pushed German politics in a more authoritarian direction. In 1929, the Müller government had come very close to repealing Paragraph 175, when the Reichstag justice committee voted to repeal Paragraph 175. However, the Müller government fell before it could submit the repeal motion to the floor of the Reichstag. Heinrich Brüning, a conservative Catholic on the right wing of the Zentrum party replaced Müller in March 1930, and was openly hostile toward gay rights and the fall of Müller ended the possibility of repealing Paragraph 175. Under the rule of Brüning as Chancellor and that of his successor, Franz von Papen, the state became increasingly hostile toward gay rights campaigners such as Hirschfeld, who began to spend more time abroad. Quite apart from the increased homophobia, Hirschfeld also became involved in a bitter debate within the Scientific-Humanitarian Committee, as the repeal bill championed by Müller also made homosexual prostitution illegal, which badly divided the committee. Hirschfeld had always argued that "what is natural cannot be immoral" and, since homosexuality was in his view natural, it should be legal. Connecting the question of the legality of homosexuality to the legality of prostitution was a blurring of the issue, since these were different matters.

=== America and a "straight turn" ===
In 1930, Hirschfeld predicted that there would be no future for people like himself in Germany, and he would have to move abroad. In November 1930, Hirschfeld arrived in New York City, ostensibly on a speaking tour about sex, but in fact to see if it was possible for him to settle in the United States. Significantly, in his speeches on this American tour, Hirschfeld, when speaking in German, called for the legalization of homosexuality, but when speaking in English did not mention the subject of homosexuality, instead urging Americans to be more open-minded about heterosexual sex. The New York Times described Hirschfeld as having come to America to "study the marriage question", while the German-language New Yorker Volkszeitung newspaper described Hirschfeld as wanting to "discuss love's natural turns" – the phrase "love's natural turns" was Hirschfeld's way of presenting his theory that there was a wide spectrum of human sexuality, all of which were "natural". Hirschfeld realized that most Americans did not want to hear about his theory of homosexuality as natural. Aware of a strong xenophobic tendency in the United States, where foreigners seen as troublemakers were unwelcome, Hirschfeld tailored his message to American tastes.

In an interview with the Germanophile American journalist George Sylvester Viereck for the Milwaukee Sentinel in late November 1930 that epitomised his "straight turn" in America, Hirschfeld was presented as a sex expert whose knowledge could improve the sex lives of married American couples. The Milwaukee Sentinel was part of the newspaper chain owned by William Randolph Hearst, which initially promoted Hirschfeld in America, reflecting the old adage that "sex sells". In the interview with Viereck, Hirschfeld was presented as the wise "European expert on romantic love" who had come to teach heterosexual American men how to enjoy sex, claiming there was a close connection between sexual and emotional intimacy. Clearly intending to flatter the egos of a heterosexual American male audience, Hirschfeld praised the drive and ambition of American men, who were so successful at business, but stated that American men needed to divert some of their energy to their sex lives. Hirschfeld added, he had seen signs that American men were now starting to develop their "romantic sides" as European men had long since done, and he had come to the United States to teach American men how to love their women properly. When Viereck objected that the U.S. was in the middle of the Great Depression, Hirschfeld replied he was certain that United States would soon recover, thanks to the relentless drive of American men.

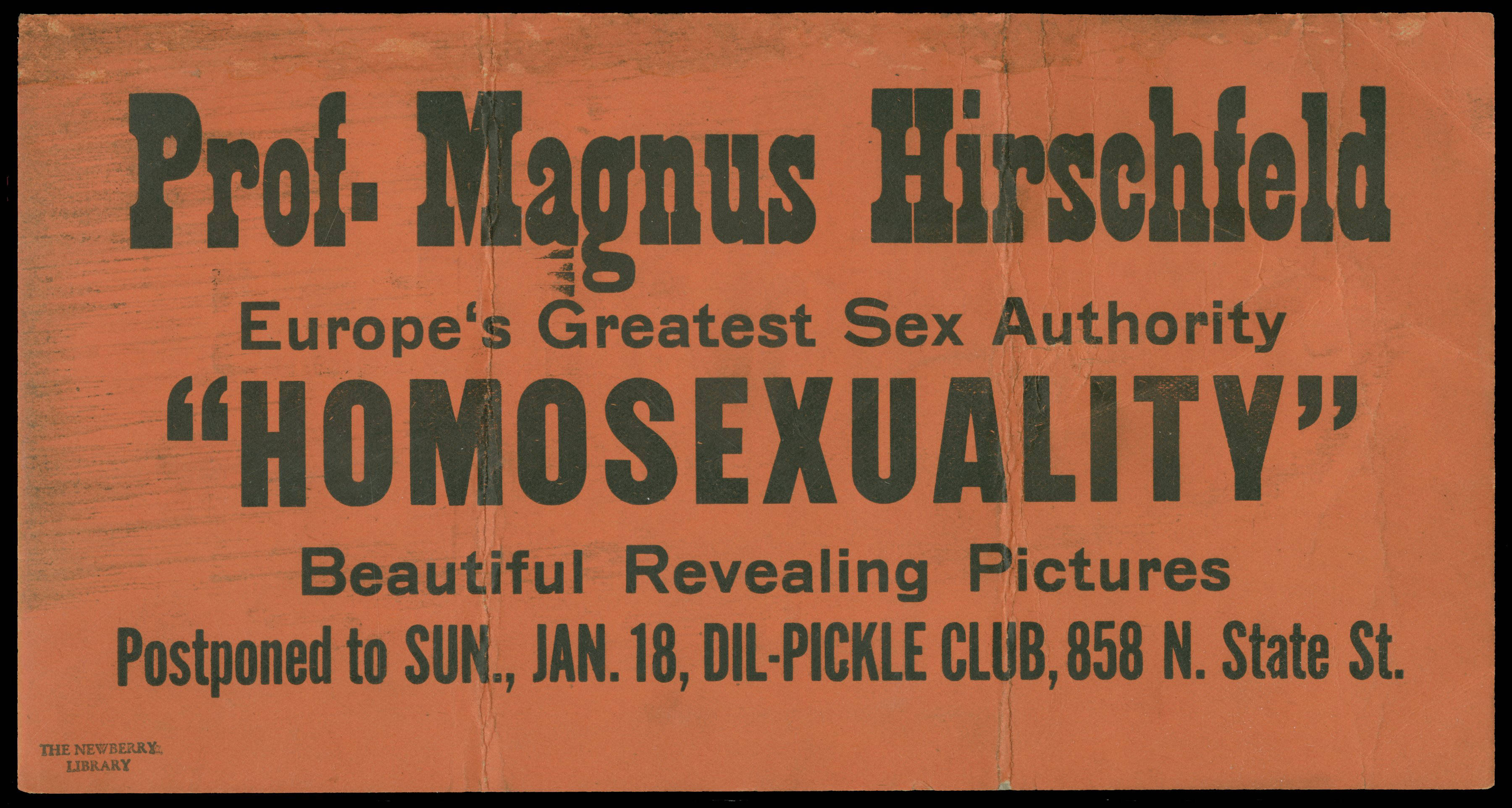
Ad for a speech "Postponed" to Sunday, 18 January 1931, at the "Dil-Pickle Club" on State Street, Chicago

At least part of the reason for his "straight turn" was financial; a Dutch firm had been marketing Titus Pearls (Titus-Perlen) pills, which were presented in Europe as a cure for "scattered nerves" and in the United States as an aphrodisiac, and had been using Hirschfeld's endorsement to help with advertising campaign there. Most Americans knew of Hirschfeld only as a "world-known authority on sex" who had endorsed the Titus Pearls pills, which were alleged to improve orgasms for both men and women. Since Hirschfeld's books never sold well, the money he was paid for endorsing the Titus Pearls pills were a major source of income for him, which he was to lose in 1933 when the manufacturer of the pills ceased using his endorsement in order to stay in the German market. In a second interview with Viereck in February 1931, Hirschfeld was presented by him as the "Einstein of Sex", which was again part of the marketing effort of Hirschfeld's "straight turn" in America. At times, Hirschfeld returned to his European message, when he planned to deliver a talk at the bohemian Dill Pickle Club in Chicago on "homosexuality with beautiful revealing pictures", which was banned by the city as indecent. In San Francisco, Hirschfeld visited San Quentin prison to meet Thomas Mooney, whose belief in his innocence he proclaimed to the press afterward, and asked for his release. Unfortunately for Hirschfeld, the Hearst newspapers, which specialized in taking a sensationalist, right-wing, populist line on the news, dug up his statements in Germany calling for gay rights, causing a sudden shift in tone from more or less friendly to hostile, effectively ending any chance of Hirschfeld being allowed to stay in the United States.

=== Asia ===
After his American tour, Hirschfeld went to Asia in February 1931. Hirschfeld had been invited to Japan by Keizō Dohi, a German-educated Japanese doctor who spoke fluent German and who worked at Hirschfeld's institute for a time in the 1920s. In Japan, Hirchfeld again tailored his speeches to local tastes, saying nothing about gay rights, and merely argued that a greater frankness about sexual matters would prevent venereal diseases. Hirschfeld sought out an old friend, S. Iwaya, a Japanese doctor who lived in Berlin in 1900–02 and who joined the Scientific-Humanitarian committee during his time there. Iwaya took Hirschfeld to the Meiji-za to introduce him to the Kabuki theater. Hirschfeld become interested in the Kabuki theater, where the female characters are played by men. One of the Kabuki actors, speaking to Hirschfeld via Iwaya, who served as the translator, was most insistent about asking him if he really looked like a woman on stage and was he effeminate enough as an actor. Hirschfeld noted that no one in Japan looked down on Kabuki actors who played female characters; on the contrary, they were popular figures with the public. Hirschfeld also met a number of Japanese feminists, such as Shidzue Katō and Ichikawa Fusae, whom he praised for their efforts to give Japanese women the right to vote. This greatly annoyed the Japanese government, which did not appreciate a foreigner criticizing the denial of female suffrage. Shortly before leaving Tokyo for China, Hirschfeld expressed the hope that his host and translator, Wilhelm Grundert, the director of the German–Japanese Cultural Institute, be made a professor at a German university. Grundert joined the Nazi Party in 1933 and, in 1936, was made a professor of Japanese studies at the University of Hamburg and, in 1938, become the chancellor of Hamburg university, all the while denouncing his former friend Hirschfeld as a "pervert". In Shanghai, Hirschfeld began a relationship with a 23-year-old Chinese man studying sexology, Li Shiu Tong (also known by his nickname Tao Li), who remained his partner for the rest of his life. Hirschfeld promised Tao that he would introduce him to German culture, saying he wanted to take him to a "Bavarian beer hall" to show him how German men drank. Tao's parents, who knew about their son's sexual orientation and accepted his relationship with Hirschfeld, threw a farewell party when the two left China, with Tao's father expressing the hope that his son would become the "Hirschfeld of China".

After staying in the Dutch East Indies (modern Indonesia), where Hirschfeld caused an uproar with a speech comparing Dutch imperialism to slavery, Hirschfeld arrived in India in September 1931. In Allahabad, Hirschfeld met Jawaharlal Nehru and gave speeches supporting the Indian independence movement, stating "it is one of the biggest injustices in the world that one of the oldest civilized nations... cannot rule independently". However, Hirschfeld's Indian speeches were mainly concerned with attacking the 1927 book Mother India by the white supremacist American author Katherine Mayo, where she painted an unflattering picture of sexuality in India as brutal and perverted, as "England-friendly propaganda". As Mayo's book had caused much controversy in India, Hirschfeld's speeches defending Indians against her accusations were well received. Hirschfeld, who was fluent in English, made a point of quoting from the articles written by W. T. Stead in The Pall Mall Gazette in 1885, exposing rampant child prostitution in London as proving that sexuality in Britain could also be brutal and perverted: a matter which, he noted, did not interest Mayo in the slightest. Hirschfeld was very interested in the subject of Indian sexuality or, as he called it, "the Indian art of love". Hirschfeld's main guide to India was Girindrasekhar Bose and, in general, Hirschfeld's contacts were limited to the English-speaking Indian elite, as he did not speak Hindi or any other Indian languages. While staying in Patna, Hirschfeld drew up a will naming Tao as his main beneficiary and asking Tao, if he should die, to take his ashes to be buried at the Institute for Sexual Research in Berlin.

=== Africa and the Middle East ===
In Egypt, where Hirschfeld and Tao traveled to next, arriving in November 1931, In Cairo, Hirschfeld and Tao met the Egyptian feminist leader Huda Sha'arawi-who stopped wearing the Muslim veil in 1923 and popularized going unveiled which, for Hirschfeld, illustrated how gender roles could change. In a rebuke to Western notions of superiority, Hirschfeld wrote "the average ethical and intellectual levels of the Egyptians was equal to that of the European nations". Hirschfeld's visit to the Palestine Mandate (present-day Palestine and Israel) marked one of the few times when he publicly referred to his Jewishness saying, as a Jew, it was greatly moving to visit Jerusalem. Hirschfeld was not a religious Jew, stating that Gottesfurcht ('fear of God', i.e. religious belief) was irrational, but that he did feel a certain sentimental attachment to Palestine. In general, Hirschfeld was supportive of Zionism, but expressed concern about what he regarded as certain chauvinist tendencies in the Zionist movement and he deplored the adoption of Hebrew as the lingua franca saying, if only the Jews of Palestine spoke German rather than Hebrew, he would have stayed. In March 1932, Hirschfeld arrived in Athens, where he told journalists that, regardless of whether Hindenburg or Hitler won the presidential election that month, he probably would not return to Germany, as both men were equally homophobic.

== Later life and exile ==
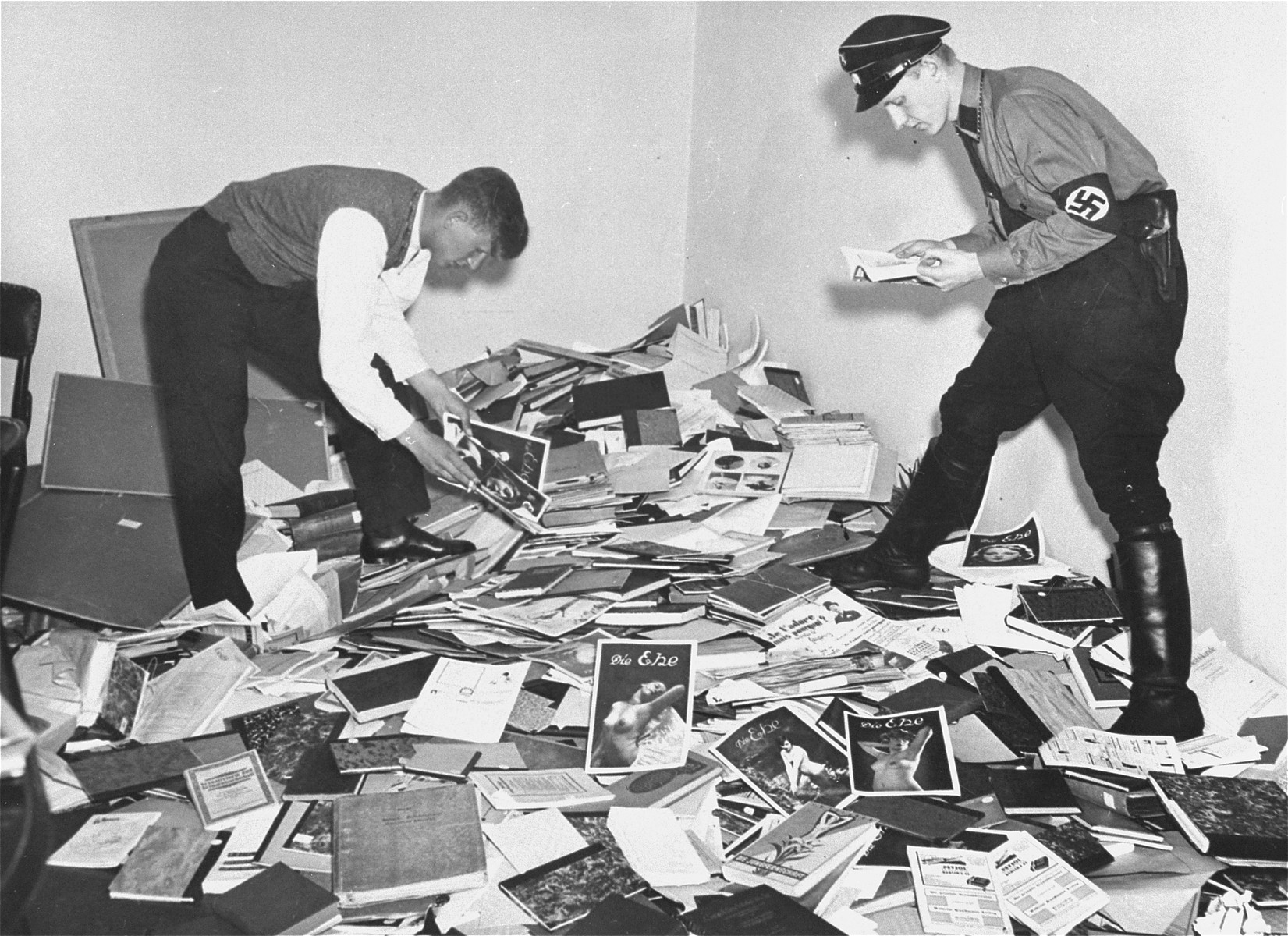
Selecting books for burning on 6 May 1933, from the library of Hirschfeld's Institute for Sexual Science (Institut für Sexualwissenschaft)

On 20 July 1932, the Chancellor Franz von Papen carried out a coup that deposed the Braun government in Prussia, and appointed himself the Reich commissioner for the state. A conservative Catholic who had long been a vocal critic of homosexuality, Papen ordered the Prussian police to start enforcing Paragraph 175 and to crack down in general on "sexual immorality" in Prussia. The Institut für Sexualwissenschaft remained open, but under Papen's rule, the police began to harass people associated with it. On 30 January 1933, President Paul von Hindenburg appointed Adolf Hitler as chancellor. Less than four months after the Nazis took power, Hirschfeld's Institute was sacked. On the morning of 6 May, a group of university students belonging to the National Socialist German Students' League stormed the institution, shouting "Brenne Hirschfeld!" ('Burn Hirschfeld!') and began to beat up its staff and smash up the premises. In the afternoon, the SA came to the institute, carrying out a more systematic attack, removing all volumes from the library and storing them for a book-burning event which was to be held four days later. In the evening, the Berlin Police arrived at the institution and announced that it was closed forever. His citizenship was later revoked by the Nazi government.

By the time of the book burning, Hirschfeld had long since left Germany for a speaking tour that took him around the world; he never returned to Germany. In March 1932, he stopped briefly in Athens, spent several weeks in Vienna and then settled in Zurich, Switzerland, in August 1932. While he was there, he worked on a book that recounted his experiences and observations while he was on his world tour and it was published in 1933 as Die Weltreise eines Sexualforschers (Brugg, Switzerland: Bözberg-Verlag, 1933). It was published in an English translation in the United States under the title Men and Women: The World Journey of a Sexologist (New York City: G. P. Putnam's Sons, 1935) and in England under the title Women East and West: Impressions of a Sex Expert (London: William Heinemann Medical Books, 1935). Hirschfeld stayed near Germany, hoping that he would be able to return to Berlin if the country's political situation improved. With the Nazi regime's unequivocal rise to power coinciding with the completion of his work on his tour book, he decided to go into exile in France. On his 65th birthday, 14 May 1933, Hirschfeld arrived in Paris, where he lived in a luxury apartment building on 24 Avenue Charles Floquet, facing the Champ de Mars. Hirschfeld lived with Li and Giese, loving both openly in a polyamorous manner. In 1934, Giese was involved in a dispute at a public bathhouse that Hirschfeld called "trifling", but it led French authorities to expel him. Giese's fate left Hirschfeld very depressed. A year-and-a-half after arriving in France, in November 1934, Hirschfeld moved south to Nice, a seaside resort on the Mediterranean coast. He lived in a luxurious apartment building with a view of the sea across an enormous garden on the Promenade des Anglais. Throughout his stay in France, he continued researching, writing, campaigning and working to establish a French successor to his lost institute in Berlin. Hirschfeld's sister, Recha Tobias, did not leave Germany and died in the Theresienstadt Ghetto on 28 September 1942 (the cause of death entered in her death certificate was "heart weakness").

While in France, Hirschfeld finished a book that he had been writing during his world tour, Rassismus (Racism). It was published posthumously in English in 1938. Hirschfeld wrote that the purpose of the book was to explore "the racial theory which underlines the doctrine of racial war", saying that he himself was "numbered among the many thousands who have fallen victim to the practical realization of this theory." Unlike many who saw the völkisch ideology of the Nazi regime as an aberration and a retrogression from modernity, Hirschfeld insisted that it had deep roots, going back to the German Enlightenment in the 18th century, and it was a part of modernity rather than an aberration from it. He added that, in the 19th century, an ideology that divided all of humanity into biologically different races – white, black, yellow, brown, and red – as devised by Johann Friedrich Blumenbach – served as a way of turning prejudices into a "universal truth", apparently validated by science. In turn, Hirschfeld held the view that this pseudoscientific way of dividing humanity was the basis of Western thinking about modernity, with whites being praised as the "civilized" race in contrast to the other races, which were dismissed for their "barbarism"; such thinking was used to justify white supremacy. In this way, he argued that the völkisch racism of the National Socialist regime was only an extreme variant of prejudices that were held throughout the Western world, and the differences between Nazi ideology and the racism that was practiced in other nations were differences in degree rather than differences in kind. Hirschfeld argued against this way of seeing the world, writing "if it were practical, we should certainly do well to eradicate the use of the word 'race' as far as subdivisions of the human species are concerned; or if we do use it in this way, to put it into quote marks to show it is questionable".

The last of Hirschfeld's books to be published during his lifetime, L'Âme et l'amour, psychologie sexologique [The Human Spirit and Love: Sexological Psychology] (Paris: Gallimard, 1935), was published in French in late April 1935; it was his only book that was never published in a German-language edition. In the book's preface, he described his hopes for his new life in France:

In search of sanctuary, I have found my way to that country, the nobility of whose traditions, and whose ever-present charm, have already been as balm to my soul. I shall be glad and grateful if I can spend some few years of peace and repose in France and Paris, and still more grateful to be enabled to repay the hospitality accorded to me, by making available those abundant stores of knowledge acquired throughout my career.

== Death ==
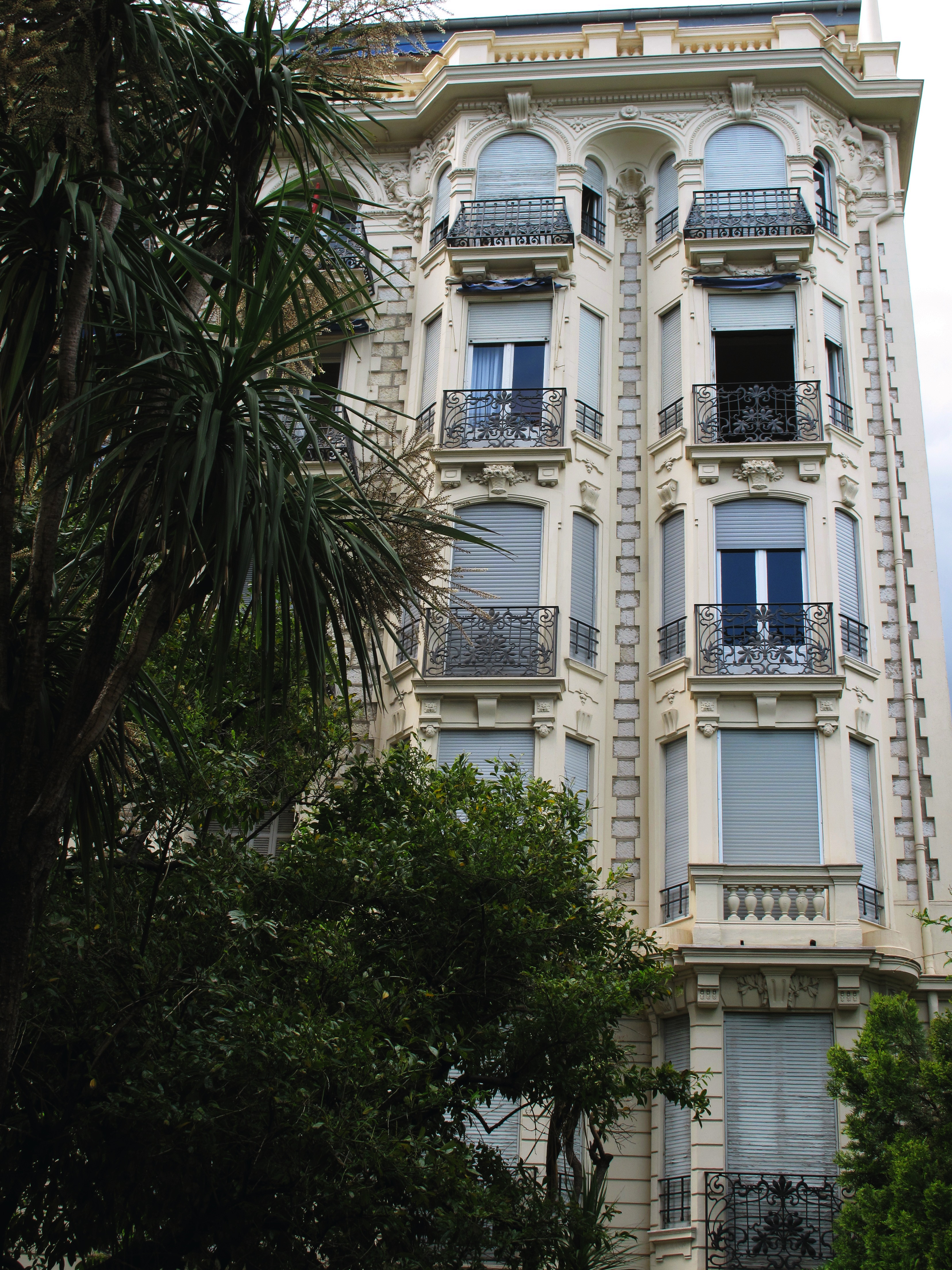
Gloria Mansions I, 63 Promenade des Anglais, Nice, in 2010, where Magnus Hirschfeld died on 14 May 1935

On his 67th birthday, 14 May 1935, Hirschfeld died of a heart attack in the garden of the apartment complex where he lived in Nice. His body was cremated, and the ashes interred in the Caucade Cemetery in Nice. The slab covering the tomb is engraved with the Latin motto of the Scientific Humanitarian Committee, "Per Scientiam ad Justitiam" ("through science to justice").

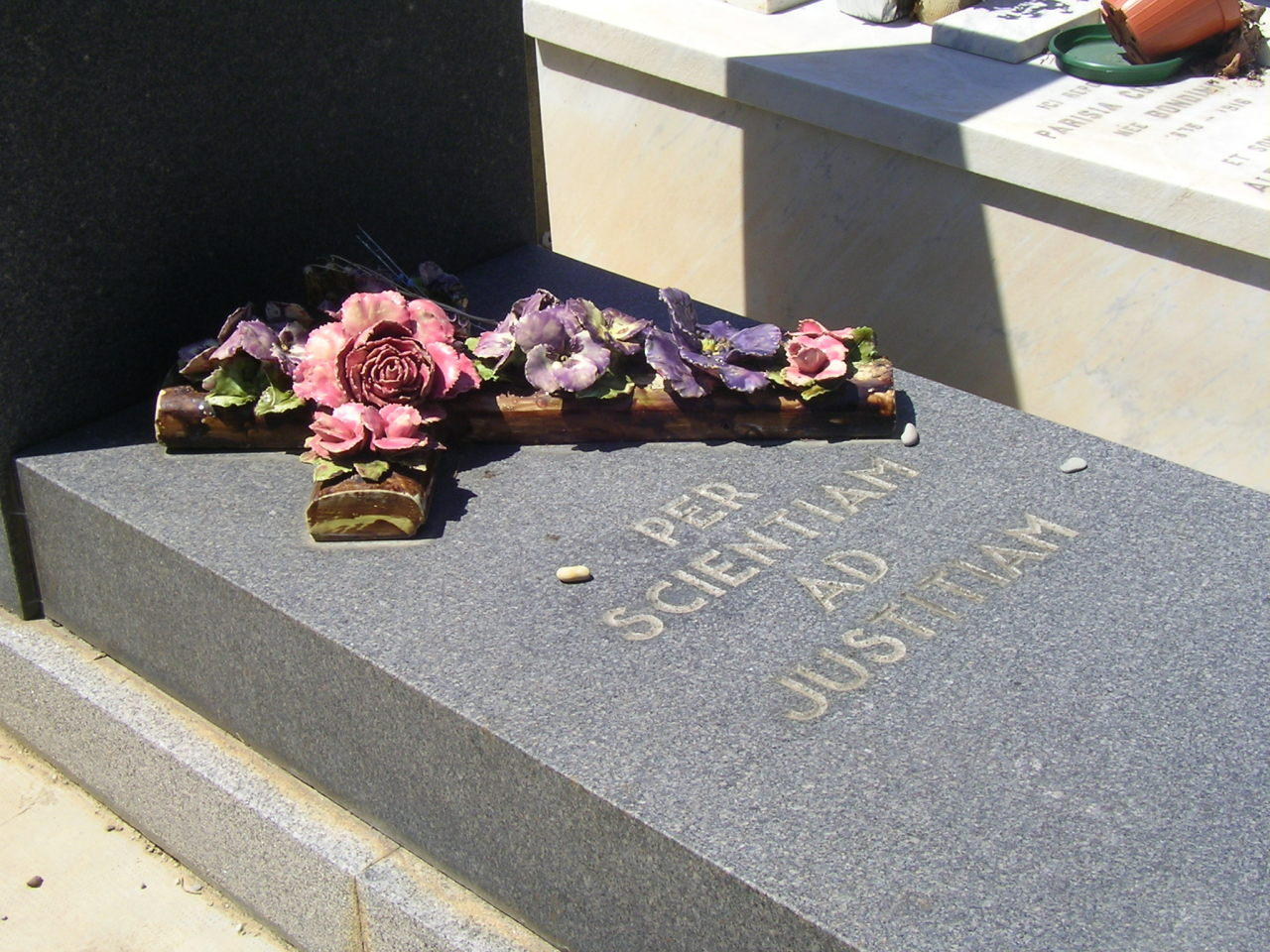
Hirschfeld's grave at Caucade Cemetery in Nice with the inscription Per Scientiam ad Justitiam ('through science to justice')

On 14 May 2010, to mark the 75th anniversary of Hirschfeld's death, a French national organization, the Mémorial de la Déportation Homosexuelle (MDH), in partnership with the new LGBT Community Center of Nice (Centre LGBT Côte d'Azur), organized a formal delegation to the cemetery. Speakers recalled Hirschfeld's life and work and laid a large bouquet of pink flowers on his tomb; the ribbon on the bouquet was inscribed "Au pionnier de nos causes. Le MDH et le Centre LGBT" ('To the pioneer of our causes. The MDH and the LGBT Center').

== Legacy ==
According to Shtetl, Hirschfeld's "radical ideas changed the way Germans thought about sexuality." American Henry Gerber, attached to the Allied Army of Occupation following World War I, became impressed by Hirschfeld and absorbed many of the doctor's ideas. Upon his return to the United States, Gerber was inspired to form the short-lived Chicago-based Society for Human Rights in 1924, the first known gay rights organization in the nation. In turn, a partner of one of the former members of the Society communicated the existence of the society to Los Angeles resident Harry Hay in 1929; Hay would go on to help establish the Mattachine Society in 1950, the first national homosexual rights organization to operate for many years in the United States. In 1979, the National LGBT Federation established the Hirschfeld Centre, Ireland's second gay and lesbian community centre. Although badly damaged by a 1987 fire, the centre continued to house the Gay Community News magazine until 1997.

In 1982, a group of German researchers and activists founded the Magnus Hirschfeld Society in West Berlin, in anticipation of the approaching 50th anniversary of the destruction of Hirschfeld's Institute for Sexual Science. Ten years later, the society established a Berlin-based center for research on the history of sexology. Since the late 20th century, researchers associated with the Magnus Hirschfeld Society have succeeded in tracking down previously dispersed and lost records and artifacts of Hirschfeld's life and work. They have brought together many of these materials at the society's archives in Berlin. At an exhibition at the Schwules Museum in Berlin from 7 December 2011 to 31 March 2012, the society publicly displayed a selection of these collections for the first time.

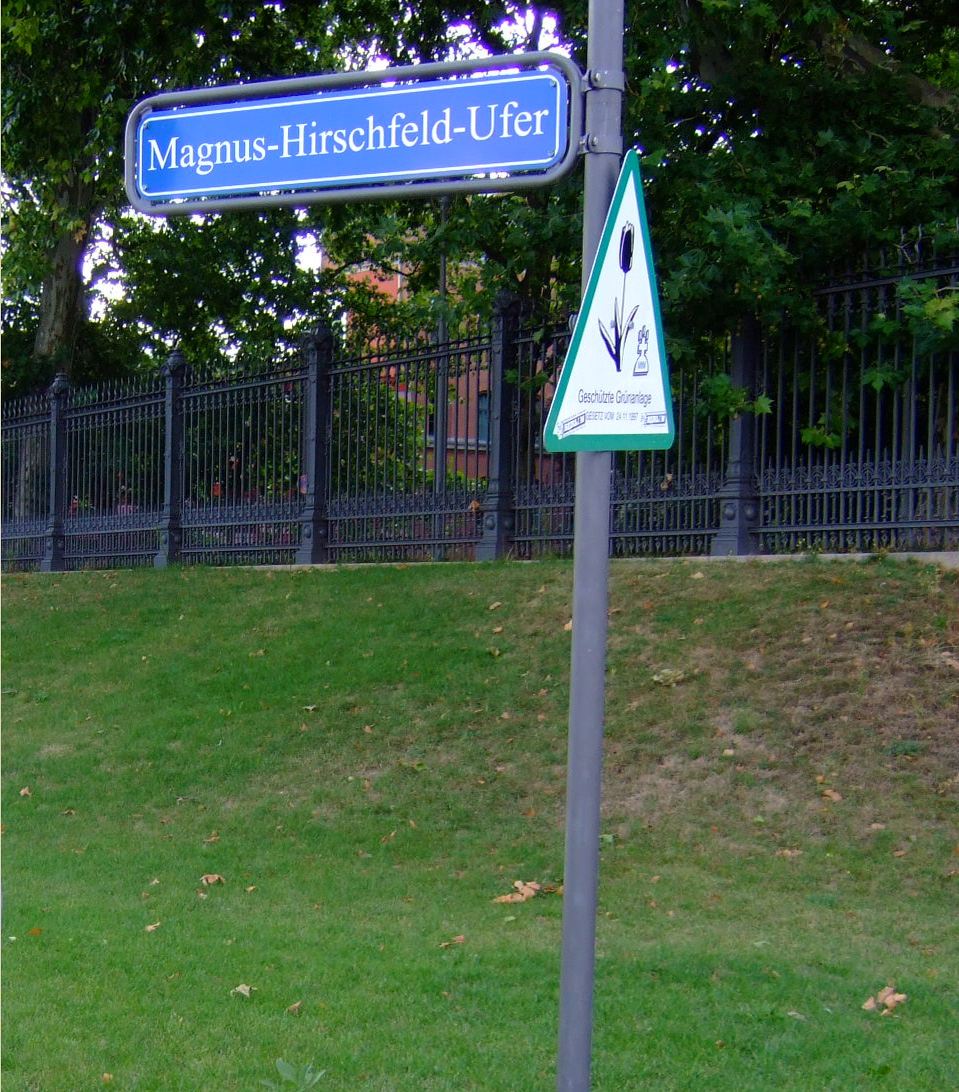
Spree promenade Magnus-Hirschfeld-Ufer in Berlin-Tiergarten

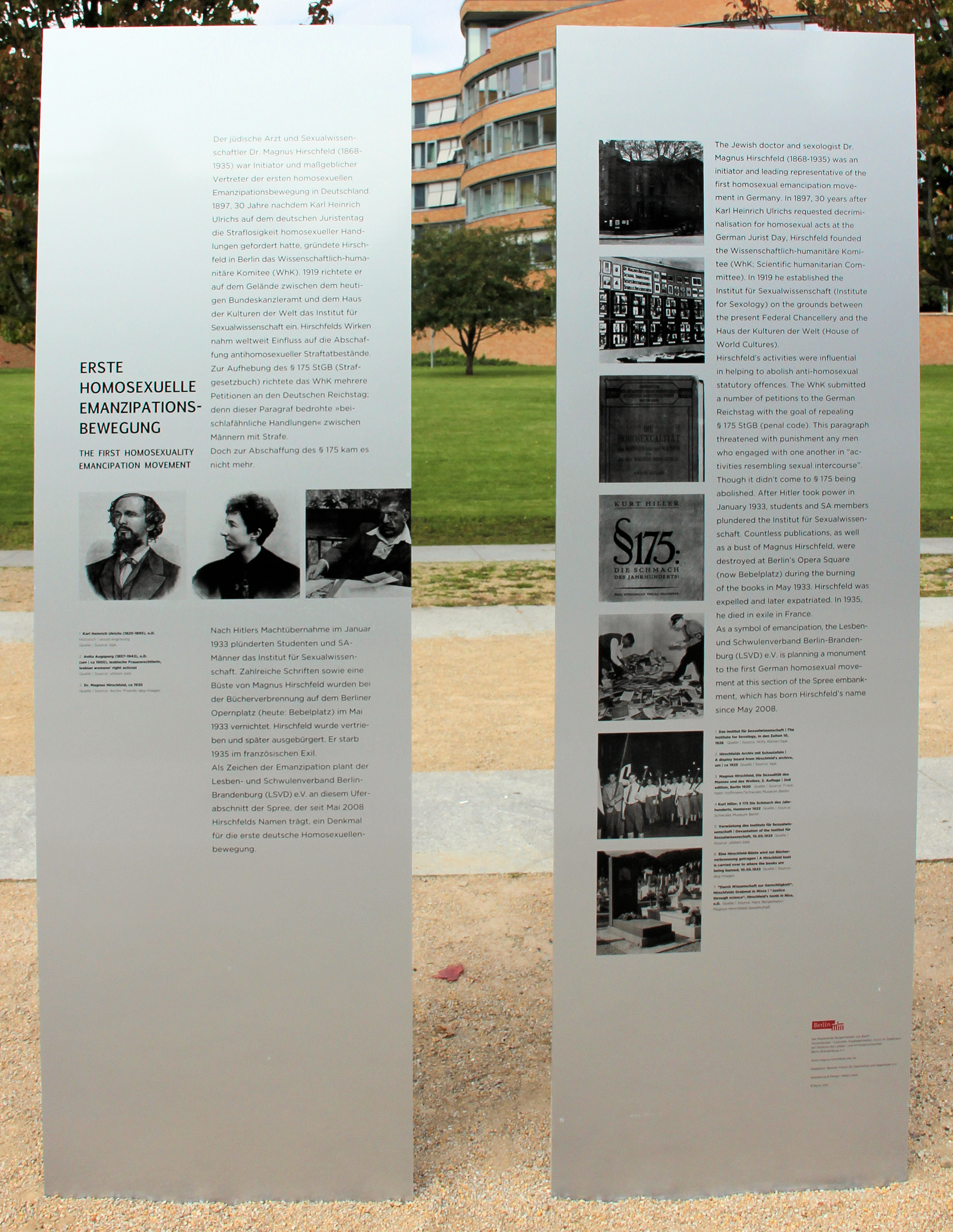
Memorial with English text at the Magnus-Hirschfeld-Ufer

The German Society for Social-Scientific Sexuality Research established the Magnus Hirschfeld Medal in 1990. The Society awards the Medal in two categories, contributions to sexual research and contributions to sexual reform. The Hirschfeld Eddy Foundation, established in Germany in 2007, is named for Hirschfeld and lesbian activist FannyAnn Eddy. In May 2008, the promenade between Moltke Bridge and the Chancellor's Garden got renamed Magnus-Hirschfeld-Ufer. On this promenade, there is a Memorial plaque with a description in English. In August 2011, after 30 years of advocacy by the Magnus Hirschfeld Society and other associations and individuals, the Federal Cabinet of Germany granted 10 million euros to establish the Magnus Hirschfeld National Foundation (Bundesstiftung Magnus Hirschfeld), a foundation to support research and education about the life and work of Magnus Hirschfeld, the Nazi persecution of homosexuals, German LGBT culture and community, and ways to counteract prejudice against LGBT people; the Federal Ministry of Justice was expected to contribute an additional 5 million euros, bringing the initial endowment of the foundation to a total of 15 million euros.

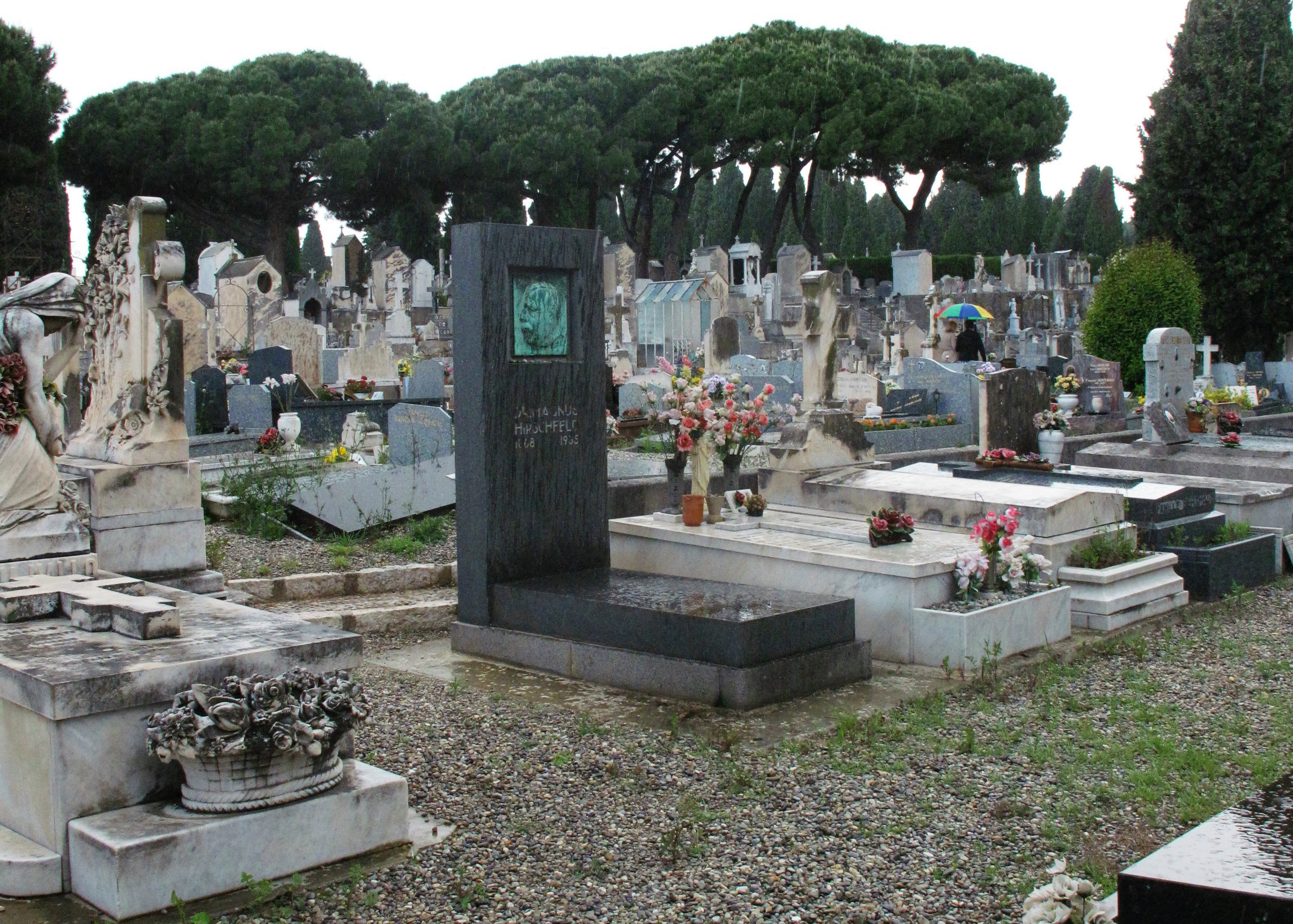
Hirschfeld's tomb in the Caucade Cemetery in Nice, France, photographed the day before the 75th anniversary of his death

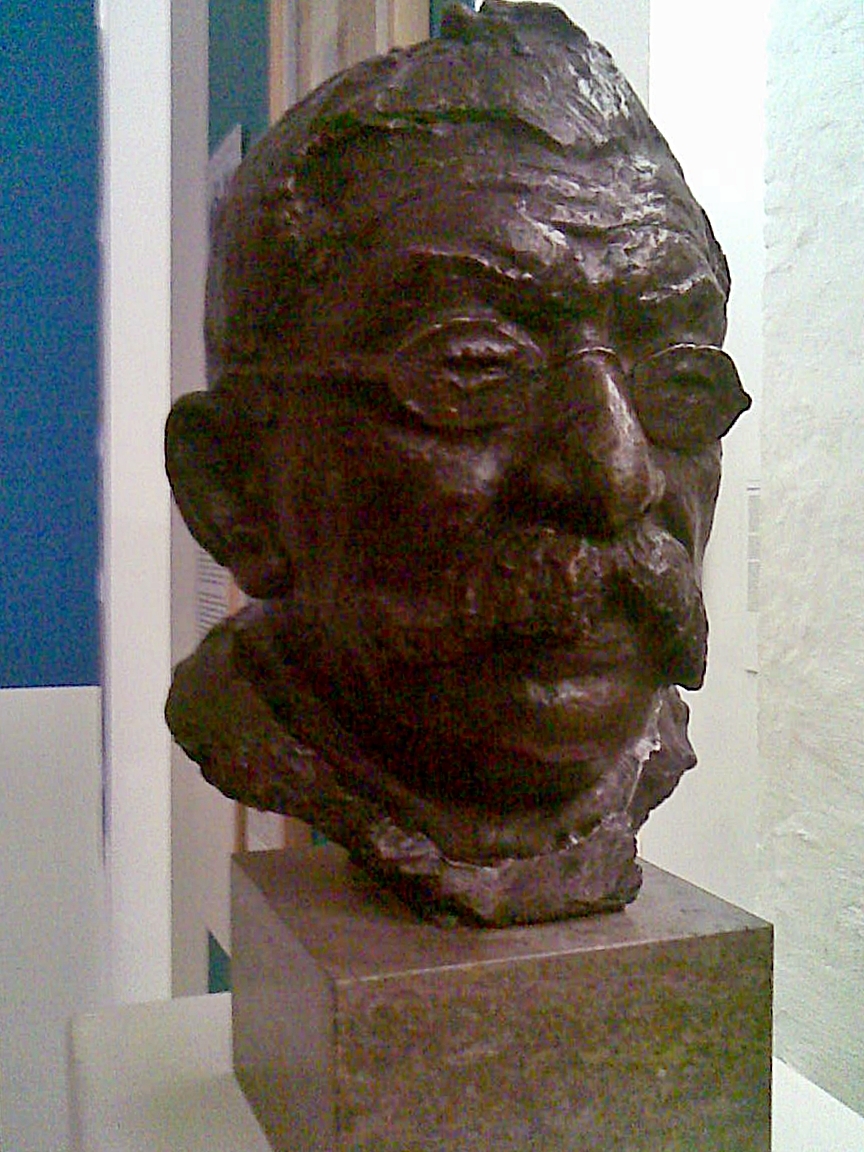
Bust of Magnus Hirschfeld in the Schwules Museum, Berlin

== Portrayals in popular culture ==
Hirschfeld has been portrayed in a number of works of popular culture both during his lifetime and subsequently. Following is a sampling of genres and titles:

=== Caricature ===
Hirschfeld was a frequent target of caricatures in the popular press during his lifetime. Historian James Steakley reproduces several examples in his German-language book Die Freunde des Kaisers. Die Eulenburg-Affäre im Spiegel zeitgenössischer Karikaturen (Hamburg: MännerschwarmSkript, 2004). Additional examples appear in the French-language book Derrière "lui" (L'Homosexualité en Allemagne) (Paris: E. Bernard, [1908]) by John Grand-Carteret.

=== Film and television ===
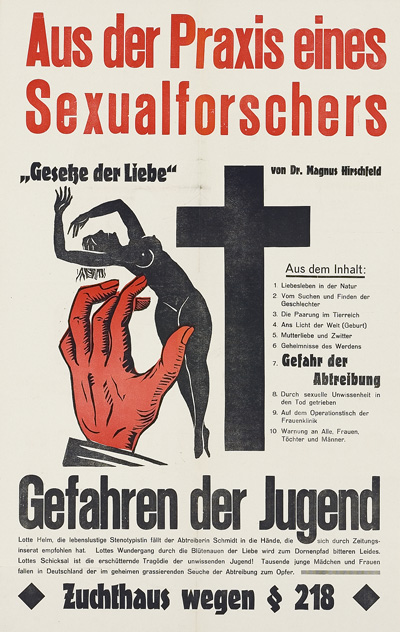
Filmposter for Hirschfeld's Gesetze der Liebe, 1927

- Different from the Others (Germany, 1919); directed by Richard Oswald; cowritten by Oswald and Magnus Hirschfeld. Hirschfeld appears in a cameo playing himself. Karl Giese, the young man who subsequently became Hirschfeld's lover, also had a part in the film.
- Race d'Ep: Un Siècle d'Images de l'Homosexualité (France, 1979); directed by Lionel Soukaz; cowritten by Soukaz and Guy Hocquenghem; released in the United States under the title The Homosexual Century. An experimental film portraying 100 years of homosexual history in four episodes, one of which focuses on Hirschfeld and his work. French gay writer Pierre Hahn played the role of Hirschfeld.
- Desire: Sexuality in Germany, 1910–1945 (United Kingdom, 1989); directed by Stuart Marshall. A feature-length documentary tracing the emergence of the homosexual subculture and the homosexual emancipation movement in pre-World War II Germany – and their destruction by the Nazi regime. According to film historian Robin Wood, Marshall "treats the burning of Hirschfeld's library and the closing of his Institute of Sexual Science as the film's... central moment...."
- A segment on Hirschfeld appears in episode 19 of Real Sex, first shown on HBO on 7 February 1998.
- The Einstein of Sex (Germany, 1999); directed by Rosa von Praunheim. A fictional biopic inspired by Hirschfeld's life and work.
- Paragraph 175 (US, 2000); directed by Rob Epstein and Jeffrey Friedman. A feature-length documentary on the persecution of homosexuals during the Nazi regime. The first part of the film provides a brief overview of the history of the homosexual emancipation movement in Germany from the late 19th century through the early 1930s, with Hirschfeld and his work prominently featured.
- Several episodes of the second season of the Amazon television series Transparent (U.S., 2014–2019) include a portrayal of Hirschfeld and his institute. Hirschfeld was portrayed by Bradley Whitford.

=== Fiction ===
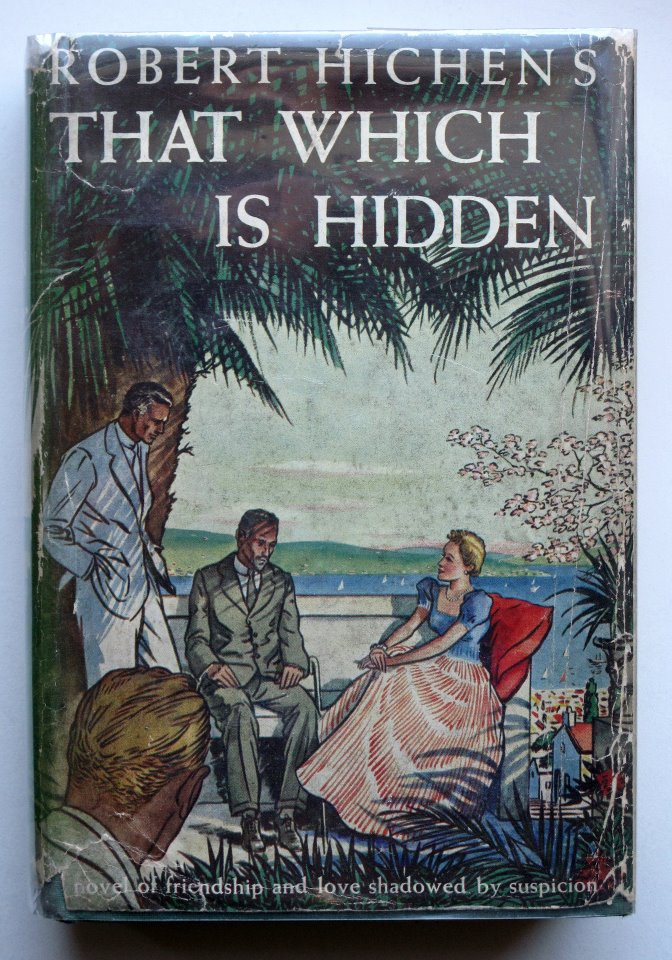
U.S. first edition of Robert Hichens, That Which Is Hidden (Doubleday, Doran, 1940)

- Robert Hichens (1939). That Which Is Hidden (London: Cassell & Company). U.S. Edition: New York: Doubleday, Doran & Company, 1940. The novel opens with the protagonist visiting the tomb of a famed Austrian sex expert, Dr. R. Ellendorf, in a cemetery in Nice. At the tomb, he meets the late doctor's protégé, a Chinese student named Kho Ling. The character of Ling refers to the memory of his mentor at numerous points in the novel. From the description of the settings and the characters, Ellendorf clearly was inspired by Hirschfeld, and Ling by Hirschfeld's last partner and heir, Li Shiu Tong (Tao Li).
- Arno Schmidt (1970). Zettels Traum (Frankfurt-am-Main: S. Fischer Verlag). Hirschfeld is quoted often in this novel about sexuality.
- Nicolas Verdan (2011). Le Patient du docteur Hirschfeld (Orbe, Switzerland: Bernard Campiche). A French-language spy thriller inspired by the sacking of Hirschfeld's Institute for Sexual Science by the Nazis.
- Milo Todd (2025). The Lilac People. The protagonist is a trans man who works as Hirschfeld's assistant, who barely escapes the burning of the Institut and lives in hiding on a farm through World War II. After the war, the US Army becomes the villain, jailing all gay and trans people liberated from Dachau, as a younger trans man escapes the Americans and finds the trans farmer. The novel takes the reader through many of the places and events before and after the war.

=== Podcasts ===
Season 4 episode 2 of the podcast Making Gay History is about Hirschfeld, as is a Special Episode in Season 5 of the Bad Gays Podcast.

== Works ==
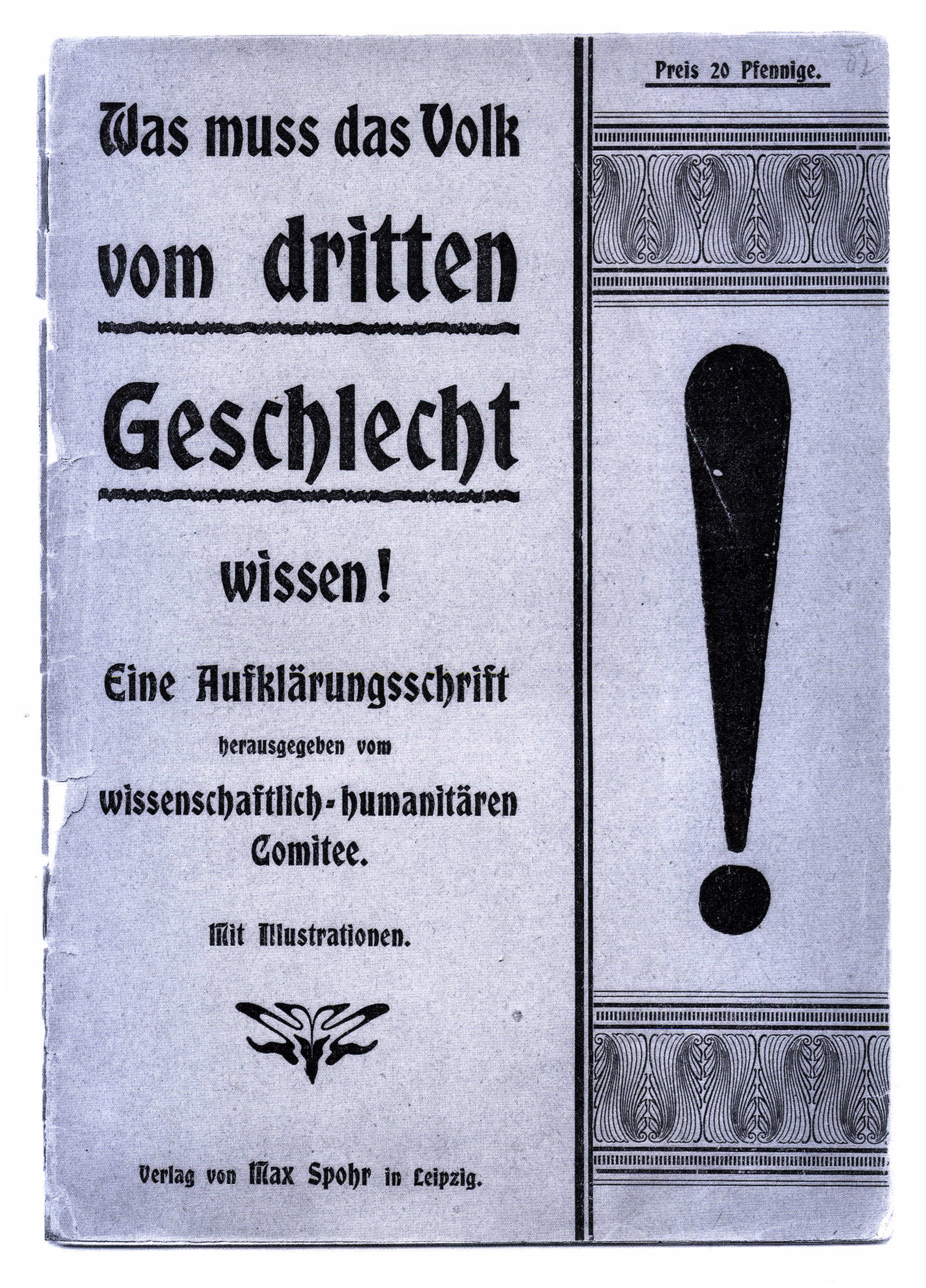
Was muss das Volk vom dritten Geschlecht wissen!, 1901

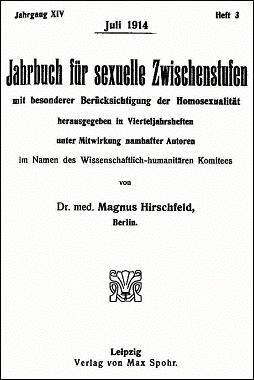
Jahrbuch für sexuelle Zwischenstufen, 1914

Hirschfeld's works are listed in the following bibliography, which is extensive but not comprehensive:

- Steakley, James D. The Writings of Magnus Hirschfeld: A Bibliography. Toronto: Canadian Gay Archives, 1985.

The following have been translated into English:

- The Objective Diagnosis of Homosexuality. Translated by M. Lombardi-Nash (1899; Jacksonville, FL: Urania Manuscripts, 2023).
- Urnish People: Causes and Nature of Uranism. Translated by M. Lombardi-Nash (1903; Jacksonville, FL: Urania Manuscripts, 2022).
- What Unites and Divides the Human Race? Translated by M. Lombardi-Nash (1919; Jacksonville, FL: Urania Manuscripts, 2020).
- Why Do Nations Hate Us? A Reflection on the Psychology of War. Translated by M. Lombardi-Nash (1915; Jacksonville, FL: Urania Manuscripts, 2020).
- Memoir: Celebrating 25 Years of the First LGBT Organization (1897–1923). Translation of Von Einst bis Jetzt by M. Lombardi-Nash (1923; Jacksonville, FL: Urania Manuscripts, 2019).
- Paragraph 175 of the Imperial Penal Code Book: The Homosexual Question Judged by Contemporaries. Translated by M. Lombardi-Nash (1898; Jacksonville, FL: Urania Manuscripts, 2020).
- My Trial for Obscenity. Translated by M. Lombardi-Nash. (1904; Jacksonville, FL: Urania Manuscripts, 2021).
- Annual Reports of the Scientific-Humanitarian Committee (1900–1903): The World's First Successful LGBT Organization. Translated by Michael A. Lombardi-Nash (1901–1903; Jacksonville, FL: Urania Manuscripts, 2021).
- Annual Reports of the Scientific-Humanitarian Committee (1904–1905): The World's First Successful LGBT Organization. Translated by Michael A. Lombardi-Nash (1905; Jacksonville, FL: Urania Manuscripts, 2022).
- Annual Reports of the Scientific-Humanitarian Committee (1906–1908): The World's First Successful LGBT Organization. Translated by Michael A. Lombardi-Nash (1908; Jacksonville, FL: Urania Manuscripts, 2022).
- Sappho and Socrates: How Does One Explain the Love of Men and Women to Persons of Their Own Sex? Translated by Michael Lombardi-Nash. (1896; Jacksonville, FL: Urania Manuscripts, 2019).
- Transvestites: The Erotic Drive to Cross-Dress. Translated by Michael A. Lombardi-Nash (1910; Amherst, NY: Prometheus Books, 1991).
- With Max Tilke, The Erotic Drive to Cross-Dress: Illustrated Part: Supplement to Transvestites. Translated by Michael A. Lombardi-Nash (1912; Jacksonville, FL: Urania Manuscripts 2022).
- The Homosexuality of Men and Women. Translated by Michael A. Lombardi-Nash. 2nd ed. (1920; Amherst, NY: Prometheus Books, 2000).
- The Sexual History of the World War (1930), New York City, Panurge Press, 1934; significantly abridged translation and adaptation of the original German edition: Sittengeschichte des Weltkrieges, 2 vols., Verlag für Sexualwissenschaft, Schneider & Co., Leipzig & Vienna, 1930. The plates from the German edition are not included in the Panurge Press translation, but a small sampling appear in a separately issued portfolio, Illustrated Supplement to The Sexual History of the World War, New York City, Panurge Press, n.d.
- Men and Women: The World Journey of a Sexologist (1933); translated by O. P. Green (New York City: G. P. Putnam's Sons, 1935).
- Sex in Human Relationships, London, John Lane The Bodley Head, 1935; translated from the French volume L'Ame et l'amour, psychologie sexologique (Paris: Gallimard, 1935) by John Rodker.
- Racism (1938), translated by Eden and Cedar Paul. This denunciation of racial discrimination was not influential at the time, although it seems prophetic in retrospect.

=== Autobiographical ===
- Hirschfeld, Magnus. Von einst bis jetzt: Geschichte einer homosexuellen Bewegung 1897–1922. Schriftenreihe der Magnus-Hirschfeld-Gesellschaft Nr. 1. Berlin: Rosa Winkel, 1986. (Reprint of a series of articles by Hirschfeld originally published in Die Freundschaft, 1920–21.)
- M.H. [Magnus Hirschfeld], "Hirschfeld, Magnus (Autobiographical Sketch)", in Victor Robinson (ed.), Encyclopaedia Sexualis, New York City: Dingwall-Rock, 1936, pp. 317–321.
- Hirschfeld, Magnus. Testament. Heft II; introduced and annotated by Ralf Dose. Berlin: Hentrich und Hentrich Verlag, 2013. (Critical edition of the only surviving volume of Hirschfeld's personal journal.)

== See also ==
- Ruth Benedict
- Harry Benjamin, an associate of Hirschfeld who brought his theories to the United States
- Adolf Brand
- Der Eigene: world's first gay journal, Berlin, 1896–1932
- First homosexual movement
- List of sex therapists
- John Money
- Herbert J. Seligmann
- Willi Pape, a famous cabaret performer who appeared in Hirschfeld's 1912 book on transvestites
