= Abortion Rights =

Abortion Rights may refer to:

- Abortion Rights (organisation)
- Abortion-rights movements
- Abortion debate
