= Stella Browne =

British feminist, socialist and birth control activist

- Born: Frances Worsley Stella Browne; 9 May 1880; Halifax, Nova Scotia
- Died: 8 May 1955 (aged 74)
- Education: Somerville College, Oxford
- Known for: Women's rights activism
- Movement: Suffragettes

Stella Browne (9 May 1880 – 8 May 1955) was a Canadian-born British feminist, socialist, sex radical, and birth control campaigner. She was one of the primary women in the fight for women's right to control and make decisions regarding their sexual choices. Active mainly in Britain, her principal focus was on sexual law reform, including the right for women to both access knowledge on and use birth control, as well as the right to abortion. She was also involved in labour parties, communist parties, as well as a number of women's societies.

Stella Browne was one of the first women to speak out in somewhat offensive ways about her beliefs with a "Forward, Charge!" approach. She did this through attacks in her articles and letters that kept her in the public's eye and added to the debates around many controversial topics surrounding women's rights. She is famous for her lectures and her work with the Abortion Law Reform Association. As a women's rights activist, Browne was able to keep questions of women's rights to their body and sexuality in the public eye long enough to get other people interested enough to keep the cause going even after her death.

== Early life ==
Stella Browne (birth name Frances Worsley Stella Browne) was born on 9 May 1880 in Halifax, Nova Scotia. She was the daughter of Daniel Marshall Browne and his second wife Anna Dulcibella Mary (née Dodwell), who went by the name Dulcie. Daniel Browne worked for the Canadian Department of Marine and Fisheries, after resigning from his post as Navigating Lieutenant in the Royal Navy. Before marrying Stella's mother, Dulcie, the eldest daughter of clergyman Reverend George Branson Dodwell, M.A., and his wife Isabella Naysmith, he was married to Catherine Magdalene MacLean in 1867. In 1869, Catharine gave birth to Daniel's first daughter Maud, and shortly after died at the age of 35 from "chronic gastritis.

Daniel and Dulcie were married on 23 February 1878, and Stella was born in 1880, followed in 1882 by her younger sister Alice Lemira Sylvia Browne, known as Sylvia. When Stella was three years old, Daniel, now Superintendent of Lighthouses, was aboard the Dominion steamship Princess Louise, and drowned. Though the family was in shock after his death, they were supported in part by money and property from his will, contingent on Dulcie remaining unmarried. Dulcie remained unmarried, sold the home and began a boarding house for single women. This boarding house meant that Stella was brought up in an environment surrounded by the struggles of single women throughout her childhood, and watched the struggle of her own mother, now a single working-woman.

Little else is known about Stella's childhood as she rarely referred to it in her later writings. She was known to have considered herself British, as opposed to Canadian – detaching herself from her roots, her family having left Halifax in 1892 when Stella was twelve.

Stella Browne was first educated in (Germany), as her mother's sister, Louisa Frances Siemens, had married an electrical-engineer with an extensive kinship network, enabling her to attend school there. While in school she became fluent in both French and German by 1899. This allowed her to write the "Women's First" to gain entrance at Oxford. She would be recognised for her refined and correct translations of German in her later life. In 1897, Browne entered the St. Felix School for Girls in Southwold, Suffolk. This school had very relaxed rules and encouraged its students to discover new things on their own. This promoted independence and leadership, as even their schoolhouses were named after women of achievement in history. While she was at school here she won a History Exhibition at Somerville College, Oxford in 1899, that afforded her £20 a year for the three years, which was given to her guardian as her mother was still living in Germany at this time. Browne then attended Somerville, where she graduated with a second-class Honours degree in Modern History in 1902. This school was especially important in her career as it was one of the only schools at the time that allowed women to write exams alongside men and had them working towards an Honours rather than a mere Pass Degree as many would. This had an influence on Browne's expectations and ideals on gender equality as it was given to her in part while she was at school here. Her political activism was also fostered at this school through her involvement with Student's Parliament.

Upon completion of her education, Browne first worked as a teacher in hopes of achieving some independence for herself. Her health however, began to decline due to a heart condition that she had, and she was no longer able to handle the strain of the job, developing additional anxiety problems. She then moved back to Germany where she discovered the budding German woman's movement, which Helene Stöcker was heading in a fairly radical manner. Stöcker was fighting at this time for women's rights of motherhood and support for the unmarried mother. Stöcker's arguments strongly affected Browne as she, later in life, would fight for women's rights to control their bodies and for the choice to become mother. Browne then began work for the Victoria County History, writing up parish histories, and learning researching skills that she would use in her later career. She left this job in 1907, moving into the position of Librarian at Morley College in South London. Here she was able to take in various controversial lectures, with topics ranging from marriage and divorce reform to eugenics. Working at the college also allowed Browne to see the different social problems faced by both working class and professional class women. Browne met her first male lover here, known as her "demi-semi-lover" and never noted by name, only by his sexual prowess. She also joined the Women's Social and Political Union (WSPU) in 1908, which marked the beginning of her social activism.

== Ideals ==
Browne began to develop her belief system while at the college, experimenting with her lover and taking in the lectures of Morley College from her post there. She wrote a letter to H. G. Wells, arguing that not only men could be polygynous, women could too and these women were "not the least attractive and intelligent, believing extramarital sex was not to be something blackening a woman's reputation.

Many of Browne's beliefs stemmed from her following of the work of Havelock Ellis, Edward Carpenter and other sexologists. She combined it with her own feminist tradition forming a perspective unique from Ellis and Carpenter, on these concepts of sexuality. In 1912, she wrote in to The Freewoman under the pseudonym "A New Subscriber", arguing with Kathlyn Oliver's article that frigidity in single women was key to good health, and should be a standard for all women. Browne's response to Oliver argued that women should not be denied sexual pleasure simply because they are not married and do not wish to be married in fear to the cruelty that sometimes accompanies this union. Oliver responded to this saying that "A New Subscriber" must be "of the male persuasion" and that women are "above and beyond men" in "sex matters". Browne's response to this accusation was that she did not like how Oliver normalised sexuality, believing that there was "more in human nature than most people will admit" and that to enforce complete abstinence on anyone despite circumstance was unfair and "stupid". This was the beginning of Browne's advocacy that women should have control over their own sexual behaviour, and not be judged by society for these activities.

Browne was a strong believer that women should have the right "equally with men, to sexual experience and sexual variety outside conventional marriage" which she addressed in her most famous paper "Sexual Variety and Variability Among Women" of 1915. She believed that women should not be confined to marriage to experience and develop the maternal instinct, while at the same time encouraged women to refuse motherhood if they wished to. Many of the other feminists looking into eugenics at this time, such as Mary Scharlieb and Elizabeth Sloan Chesser, believed strongly that reform could be accomplished within the companionship of marriage. More radical members such as Browne believed that the "cult of motherhood ... would, if unchecked, diminish the importance of women as individuals and bind them more closely with conventional forms of marriage ... [reinforcing] their subordination. Browne's advocacy of these rights for women, along with her goal of assistance for single mothers, one could argue stemmed from her living in a home with a single-mother for most of her childhood.

Browne strongly believed working women should have the choice to become pregnant, or terminate their pregnancy while they worked in the horrible circumstances surrounding a pregnant woman who was still required to do hard labour during her pregnancy. In this case she argued that doctors should give free information about birth control to women that wanted to know about it. This would give women agency over their own circumstances and allow them to decide whether they wanted to be mothers or not. It also would give women the opportunity to, as Browne advocated, engage in sex solely for pleasure and outside of marriage if they chose. Browne would remain loyal to this perspective throughout her life.

=== Activism ===
By 1911, Browne identified herself as being "a Socialist and 'extreme' Left-Wing feminist. She worked most notably as a campaigner for women's rights to birth control and abortion and was most interested in rights and control over women's sexuality and body. Over this time period she wrote for a number of papers including The Call, The Malthusian, The New Generation (a new instalment of The Malthusian), The Freewoman, and Beauty and Health, as well as some of her own independent publications. She also wrote a number of reviews, and translations of popular works on the reforms mentioned above as well, which she was often commended for.

She began her activism in 1907 when she joined the WSPU for a short time. The WSPU was founded on 10 October 1903 and had nothing to differentiate it from other women-only groups of the time, not even having reached 30 members by 1905. However, its notoriety developed when in 1905 they first used militant methods as part of its campaign for the vote, where both leaders of this rebellion, Christabel Pankhurst and Annie Kenney, were arrested, bringing the Manchester Independent Labour Party (ILP) to assist them. The ILP's assistance brought them to the forefront of media coverage and the WSPU and their militancy swept the country. This radical form of feminism continued until 1913 and that had women committing to hunger strikes and being fed forcedly, and the imprisonment of almost a thousand suffragettes no longer made headlines it was so widespread. Browne left in 1913 however, opposing Christabel Pankhurst's "ignorant and presumptuous dogmatism" and the way that the group's leadership behaved towards women and men of lower class seemed to counter their arguments for feminism and democracy. After this she spent much of her time working with the British Society for the Study of Sex Psychology, attending meetings and writing papers on their behalf, in hopes of discovering more for her future battles on birth control.

In the late 1920s Browne began a speaking tour around the country, providing information about her beliefs on the need for accessibility of information about birth control for women, women's health problems, problems related to puberty and sex education and high maternal morbidity rates among other topics. These talks urged women to take matters of their sexuality and their health into their own hands. Birth control was an embarrassing issue because it would directly challenge relations between men and women too, making this control for women a touchy subject. During this tour several women asked Browne for abortions, however as Jones recognises in her article, Browne was not "medically qualified" and had to refuse them. Though she was becoming increasingly interested in women's right to terminate their pregnancies, she would still be considered a "heretic" were she to say so at this time. Despite this, in 1929 she brought forward her lecture "The Right to Abortion" in front of the World Sexual Reform Congress in London. In the years leading up to the presentation of this paper, Browne worked to gather information on maternal mortality, and found that rates were higher than ever before in 1929, and became the secretary of the Chelsea Labour Party in hopes of bringing ideas of birth control and abortion to light in political platform in 1926. She was unable to do so as she was forced to leave Chelsea later in 1926, as the Party was no longer recognised as a political Party. By the end of the 1920s, Browne had felt that the fight for birth control had become more successful, as it was more frequently seen in the public sphere and was now being talked about and debated more openly. In April 1930 the Birth Control Conference was a success bringing 700 delegates to attendance and bringing birth control into the political sphere, which she attended and spoke at. In July 1930, the Ministry of Health issued MCW/153, which allowed local authorities to give birth control advice in welfare centres, another partial success for Browne.

In 1931 Browne began to develop her argument for women's right to decide to have an abortion. She again began touring, giving lectures on abortion and the negative consequences that followed if women were unable to terminate pregnancies of their own choosing such as: suicide, injury, permanent invalidism, madness and blood-poisoning. By bringing the topic of legalised abortion into discussion, it was a major accomplishment in July 1932 when the British Medical Association council was called to form a committee to discuss making changes to the laws on abortion.

=== Affiliation with the Abortion Law Reform Association ===
On 17 February 1936, Browne along with Janet Chance and Alice Jenkins began the Abortion Law Reform Association (ALRA), continuing to support it until their deaths years later. In their first year with the ALRA they recruited 35 members, and by 1939 they had almost 400 members, that came primarily from the working class through labour groups and women's branches of the co-operative movement. These women now wanted the privileges that "moneyed classes had enjoyed for years.

The ALRA, as ran by these three women, was very active between 1936 and 1939 sending speakers around the country to talk about Labour and Equal Citizenship and attempted, though most often unsuccessfully, to have letters and articles published in newspapers. They became the most popular when a member of the ALRA's Medico-Legal Committee received the case of a fourteen-year-old girl who had been raped, and received a termination of this pregnancy from Dr. Joan Malleson, a progenitor of the ALRA. This case gained a lot of publicity, however once the war began, the case was tucked away and the cause again lost its importance to the public.

After the war, the fight for abortion rights was renewed and Browne came back to her fight for the education of women in matters of sex. Her endeavours on this front afforded her the rank of first Patron and later Vice-President of the Society for Sex Education and Guidance, a group set up in 1943. She continued to be involved with the ALRA until her death, however she was unable to attend most of their meetings due to failing health. During this time, she was giving suggestions for actions that the ALRA could perform and these were continually followed. Browne's opinions on sexual reform were clearly still valued despite her increasing age and inability to be as involved as she once was. Browne was able to see the time come when medical terminations of pregnancy became more common though, which was a comfort to her.

Browne had a severe heart attack at the beginning of May 1955, and the night before her seventy-fifth birthday she died. The worst offence that was afforded to Browne can be found on her death certificate where under occupation she is noted as being a "Spinster: No occupation.” Considering her opinion that women should not be labelled for their choice not to marry, this would be a huge insult to Browne.

== Historiography ==
Research on Stella Browne's life and contributions to women's rights has been a gradually cumulative research process, in which each article or book written about her has pieced together the facts and commentary of those before them. So Lesley Hall's biography of Browne thanks Sheila Rowbotham for bringing Stella Browne into the public's eye for the first time, and Sheila Rowbotham's A New World For Women: Stella Browne, Social Feminist in turn thanked Keith Hindell for helping her with references for the section of her book about the National Abortion Campaign. In this way, one could conclude that instead of having contradictory views of Browne, historians have wanted to collaborate in making Browne better known in feminist history.

The common understanding of Browne as a person is, as Jones explains her to be, more "economically and professionally marginal" than the other women working with the sexuality question at the time, though she was more "radical" in her views on both sexual and social questions. Though Jones seems to consider Browne's social standing to have been mediocre, she does give her considerable credit for her radicalism, and passion, as do each of the other historians. Hindell characterises Browne as a "somewhat eccentric blue-stocking" who was "not easily deflected by apathy, ridicule or hostility". This image of a woman resolute in defence of her beliefs is supported by Hall's biography of Browne, which consistently portrays her as someone who when knocked down, returned to her work with "unabated, even increased vigor.

If her radicalism may be seen to some as a negative thing, however Sheila Jeffreys rationalises Browne's radicalism saying that to "promote the joy of sex […] it [was] necessary to be uncompromising in their attack on all those whom they considered to be standing in the way of this march to sexual freedom. She notes that to do this feminists were required to, before World War One, to make these attacks on the vast majority of their colleagues, particularly "spinsters amidst the ranks". References to the attack on a specific "spinster" of the time, Kathlyn Oliver is referenced by both Jeffreys, Hall and Rowbotham in their articles, solidifying that there is an importance of these attacks in furthering an understanding of women's sexual activity not having an adverse effect on them. Jeffreys notes that Browne was very capable of getting her point across when discussing her opinion that sex should be enjoyed by women openly to Oliver, and the power of her argument is supported by Hall's assertion that later Oliver joined the British Society for the Study of Sex Psychology to look into her sexuality, a suggestion made to her by Browne.

Jones also notes that Browne was one of the "advanced" women that emerged before the First World War, writing for many different socialist and liberal periodicals and newspapers, getting involved in study groups set up by progressive intellectuals and also herself becoming involved in campaigns for sexual and social reform. These examples of Browne's activity in the struggle for women's rights concerning control over their sexuality is mirrored in each of the other works on Browne who only stop to explain that it was not always easy for Browne to please everyone because of her forward thinking.

The most common argument then, across the research is that Stella Browne had the most trouble getting her two beliefs to coexist appropriately. Jones says that Browne constantly needed to be on the offensive around her ideals on eugenics around her socialist friends and Rowbotham comments on Browne's "continuing double struggle" to maintain both of these ideals finding connections between the two, which others in her two separate streams of struggle may not have agreed with fully. Browne was a hardworking woman who believed in her work so much so that she was even considered to have a "personal intransigence [that] meant she was as often at odds with her allies as with this her enemies. One from the literature on Browne can conclude that she has value to the study of women's sexuality and sexual reform that historians who have studied her believe should continue to be explored and brought to the public's attention.

== Legacy ==
Stella Browne has written on arguments ranging from women's rights to sexuality. She is one of the few women to have written works on the interaction of socialism and feminism. In particular she has written of the "double struggle", as Rowbotham calls it, of being both socialist and feminist, while also trying to understand connections between the two.

She also left behind the ALRA upon her death, which gained a flood of new members as women began to recognise the insufficiency of the current contraceptives, and the scandal that came with the effects of thalidomide. Had Browne not been one of the few talking about birth control during a time when it was a topic not to be talked about, and then women would have no birth control to contest and improve in the first place. Browne then, had a profound effect on the abortion reform, as Hindell notes in his article, "if ALRA had not worked steadily for many years in a hostile climate, and campaigned intensively...reform would not have come as early, or as radically as it did.

== Works ==
- Sexual variety & variability among women and their bearing upon social reconstruction, London: Printed for the Society by C.W. Beaumont, 1917. Society for the Study of Sex Psychology, publication no. 3
- 'Women and Birth Control', in Eden & Cedar Paul, eds., Population and Birth Control, 1917.
- (tr. with Ella Winter) The diary of Otto Braun, with selections from his letters and poems, New York, Alfred A. Knopf 1924.
- (tr.) Ideal Marriage: Its Physiology and Technique by Theodoor Hendrik van de Velde. London, W. Heinemann, 1926. With an introduction by J. Johnston Abraham.
- (tr.) Fertility and sterility in marriage: their voluntary promotion and limitation by Theodoor Hendrik van de Velde. London, W. Heinemann, 1929.
- (tr.) The family by Franz Carl Müller-Lyer. London : G. Allen & Unwin, 1931.
- (with A. M. Ludovici and Harry Roberts) Abortion, London: G. Allen & Unwin ltd., 1935.
- (tr.) History of modern morals by Max Hodann. London: William Heinemann Medical Books, 1937.

== Sources ==
- Cowman, Krista (2002). "'Incipient Toryism'? The Women's Social and Political Union and the Independent Labour Party, 1903–1914". History Workshop Journal. 53: 129–148. doi:10.1093/hwj/53.1.128.
- Hall, Lesley (1997). "'I have never met the normal woman': Stella Browne and the politics of womanhood". Women's History Review. 6 (2): 157–182. doi:10.1080/09612029700200293.
- Hall, Lesley A. (2011). The Life and Times of Stella Browne: Feminist and Free Spirit. I.B. Tauris & Co. Ltd.: New York. ISBN 9781848855830.
- Hindell, Keith; Simms, Madeline (1968). "How the abortion lobby worked". The Political Quarterly. 39 (3): 269–282. doi:10.1111/j.1467-923x.1968.tb00267.x.
- Jeffreys, Sheila (1982). "'Free from all uninvited touch of man': Women's campaigns around sexuality, 1880–1914". Women's Studies International Forum. 5 (6): 629–645. doi:10.1016/0277-5395(82)90104-2.
- Jones, Greta (1995). "Women and eugenics in Britain: The case of Mary Scharlieb, Elizabeth Sloan Chesser, and Stella Browne". Annals of Science. 52 (5): 481–502. doi:10.1080/00033799500200361. PMID 11640067.
- Rowbotham, Sheila (1977). A new world for women: Stella Browne, social feminist. London: Pluto Press. ISBN 9780904383546.
