= British Society for the Study of Sex Psychology =

The British Society for the Study of Sex Psychology (BSSSP) was founded in 1913, "to advance a particularly radical agenda in the field of sex reform, based on the writings of gurus such as [Edward] Carpenter and [Havelock] Ellis." Magnus Hirschfeld, the famous German-Jewish sexologist, was also a co-founder. In 1931, the Society was renamed the British Sexological Society. It seems to have continued until some point in the 1940s.

The society was particularly concerned with homosexuality, aiming to combat legal discrimination against homosexuality with scientific understanding. Members included George Cecil Ives, Edward Carpenter, Montague Summers, Stella Browne (a founder of the Abortion Law Reform Association), Laurence Housman, Havelock Ellis, Bernard Shaw, and Ernest Jones.

The society had established a number of contacts in the United States, including Margaret Sanger, who gave a speech to the group on the issue of sexual continence. The BSSSP had planned to form an American branch.

== Publications of the BSSSP ==
The Society published a series of pamphlets:

- No. 1. Policy & principles, general aims, London: C.W. Beaumont for the Society, [1914].
- No. 2. The social problem of sexual inversion, London: Beaumont, [1913?]. Abridged translation from the German treatise... published under the auspices of the Humanitarian-Science Committee (Wissenschaftlich-humanitären [sic] Komitee) of Leipzig and Berlin in 1903.
- No. 3. Stella Browne, Sexual variety & variability among women and their bearing upon social reconstruction, London: Printed for the Society by C.W. Beaumont, 1917.
- No. 4. Laurence Housman, The relation of fellow-feeling to sex, London: Printed for the Society by Battley Bros, [1917?].
- No. 5. Havelock Ellis, The erotic rights of women, and The objects of marriage: two essays, Battersea: Battley Bros. for the Society, 1918.
- No. 6. Montague Summers, The Marquis de Sade: a study in algolagnia, London: Battley Bros. for the Society, 1920.
- No. 7. Hugh Northcote, The Social Value of the Study of Sex Psychology, London, 1920.
- No. 8. Edward Westermarck, The origin of sexual modesty, London: J. E. Francis for the Society, 1921.
- No. 9. Havelock Ellis, The play-function of sex, London: J. E. Francis for the Society, 1921.
- No, 10. Eden Paul, The sexual life of the child, London: J. E. Francis for the Society, 1921.
- No. 11. Eden Paul & Norman Haire, Rejuvenation: Steinach's researches on the sex-glands, London: J. E. Francis for the Society, 1923.
- No. 12. Harold Picton, The morbid, the abnormal and the personal, London: J. E. Francis for the Society, 1923.
- No. 13. Edward Carpenter, Some friends of Walt Whitman, etc., London: J. E. Francis for the Society, 1924.
- No. 14. Francis Albert Eley Crew, Sexuality and intersexuality, London: J. E. Francis for the Society, 1925.
- No. 15. H. D. J. White, Psychological causes of homoerotism & inversion, London: J. E. Francis for the Society, 1925.
- No. 16. Cecil Reddie, Edward Carpenter, 1844 born at Brighton, died at Guildford 1929 : one of the founders and the first president of the Society, London: British Sexological Society, 1932.
- No. 17. Frank Braine Rockstro, A plain talk on sex difficulties, etc., London: British Sexological Society, 1933.

== See also ==
- World League for Sexual Reform
