= Franz Carl Müller-Lyer =

German psychologist and sociologist

Franz Carl Müller-Lyer, born Franz Xaver Hermann Müller (5 February 1857 – 29 October 1916), was a German psychologist and sociologist. The Müller-Lyer illusion is named after him.

Two sets of arrows that exhibit the Müller-Lyer optical illusion. The set on the bottom shows that all the shafts of the arrows are of the same length.

== Life ==
Müller-Lyer was born in Baden-Baden, Grand Duchy of Baden. He studied medicine at the Universities of Strasbourg, Bonn, and Leipzig. He also studied psychology and sociology at the Universities of Berlin, Vienna, Paris and London.

In 1888 he entered into private practice in Munich.

Müller-Lyer's speculations on the evolution of the role of the family in human society received prominent mention in Bertrand Russell's 1924 essay "Styles in Ethics," which argued for the relativity and impermanence of moral standards.

The optical illusion he described in 1889 involves the perception of the length of a line when the ends are capped by chevrons. Diverging chevrons seem to make the line longer when compared with converging chevrons.

Müller-Lyer died in Munich.

== Works ==
- Phasen der Kultur und Richtungslinien des Fortschritts, 1908. Translated by Elizabeth Coote Lake & Hilda Amelia Lake as The history of social development, London: G. Allen & Unwin Ltd, 1920.
- Der sinn des lebens und die wissenschaft. Grundlinien einer volksphilosophie, München: Lehman, 1910.
- Die Familie, München: J.F. Lehmann, 1911. Translated by Stella Browne as The family, London: G. Allen & Unwin, 1931.
- Formen der Ehe, der Familie und der Verwandstschaft, Müchen: J.F. Lehman, 1911.
- Phasen der Liebe : eine Soziologie des Verhältnisses der Geschlechter, München: A. Langen, 1913. Translated by Isabella Wigglesworth as The evolution of modern marriage: a sociology of sexual relations, London: George Allen & Unwin Ltd., 1929.
- Soziologie der leiden, München: A. Langen, 1914.
- Die Zähmung der Nornen, 2 vols., München: Albert Langen, 1918-1924. Edited by Betty Müller-Lyer.
