= Müller-Lyer illusion =

Optical illusion

Two sets of arrows that exhibit the Müller-Lyer optical illusion. The set on the bottom represents the classic Müller-Lyer stimulus, while on the top is its Brentano modification. All the shafts of the arrows are of the same physical length.

The Müller-Lyer illusion is an optical illusion consisting of three stylized arrows. When viewers are asked to place a mark on the figure at the midpoint, they tend to place it more towards the "tail" end. The illusion was devised by Franz Carl Müller-Lyer (1857–1916), a German sociologist, in 1889.

Research suggests all humans are susceptible to the illusion across cultures.

A variation of the same effect (and the most common form in which it is seen today) consists of a set of arrow-like figures. Straight line segments of equal length comprise the "shafts" of the arrows, while shorter line segments (called the fins) protrude from the ends of the shaft. The fins can point inwards to form an arrow "head" or outwards to form an arrow "tail". The line segment forming the shaft of the arrow with two tails is perceived to be longer than that forming the shaft of the arrow with two heads.

== Susceptibility ==
The Müller-Lyer illusion

←──────────────→
fins inward (arrowheads)
>──────────────<
fins outward (tails)

The two central shafts are exactly the same length, yet the fins-outward figure usually looks longer. An interactive version of this figure — adjust one line until it looks equal to the other, then measure how far off you were — is available with JavaScript enabled.

The illusion appears to be experienced by all human beings seeing it, even those who have been blind. This suggests susceptibility to the illusion is neurologically constant across humans, and undermines hypothesis promulgated in the twentieth century proposing that susceptibility was culturally determined. Such hypotheses were based on research that suffered from poor methodology and contamination by false cultural assumptions.

Non-human animals are also susceptible to the illusion.

== Perspective explanation ==
The Müller-Lyer effect in a non-illusion

One possible explanation, given by Richard Gregory, is that the Müller-Lyer illusion occurs because the visual system learns that the "angles in" configuration corresponds to a rectilinear object, such as the convex corner of a room, which is closer, and the "angles out" configuration corresponds to an object which is far away, such as the concave corner of a room. In a report from 2005, the hypothesis is tested by analyzing templates corresponding to the illusion in natural images, finding that the sort of image caused by a Müller-Lyer stimulus was more likely to come from a physical source with the source of the outward pointing line being longer on average than the source of the inward pointing line. The visual system of human beings learn how to make a very efficient interpretation of 3D scenes. That is why when somebody goes away from a viewer, the viewer does not perceive them as getting shorter. Likewise, someone who stretches one arm and looks at both of their hands will perceive them to be the same size. Visual illusions are sometimes held to show that what is seen is an image created in the brain. The brain supposedly projects the image of the smaller hand to its correct distance in an internal 3D model. This is what is called the size constancy mechanism hypothesis.

In the Müller-Lyer illusion, the visual system would in this explanation detect the depth cues, which are usually associated with 3D scenes, and incorrectly decide it is a 3D drawing. Then the size constancy mechanism would make us see an erroneous length of the object which, for a true perspective drawing, would be farther away.

In the perspective drawing in the figure, we see that in usual scenes the heuristic works quite well. The width of the rug should obviously be considered shorter than the length of the wall in the back.

Ross Day developed explanations in which position on these illusions opposes Richard Gregory's argument for acculturation of architectural space as influencing a false sense of perspective in such illusions. Ross countered that it is not the result of misapplied size constancy, but that such illusions rely on whole-part determination and space–time reciprocity, that the whole figure is the primary determinant of the illusion; "you don't change the perception of illusions very much with experience; it hardly changes them at all."

Catherine Howe and Dale Purves contradicted Gregory's explanation:

Although Gregory's intuition about the empirical significance of the Müller-Lyer stimulus points in the right general direction (i.e., an explanation based on past experience with the sources of such stimuli), convex and concave corners contribute little if anything to the Müller-Lyer effect.

This variant of dynamic Müller-Lyer illusion by Italian researcher Gianni A. Sarcone shows that though the collinear blue and red segments seem to oscillate up and down, they are always the same length. Nothing moves except the arrows at the endpoints of each color segments. This visual illusion also involves a dynamic "neon color spreading" effect.

A dynamic visual demonstration by Italian researcher Gianni A. Sarcone: the blue and black segments of the star are equal in length and always the same length, though they appear to alternately stretch and shrink.

Brentano figure with the rotating Müller-Lyer wings (distractors); actually, pieces of the wings (stimulus terminators) are aligned and spaced equidistantly

== Centroid explanation ==
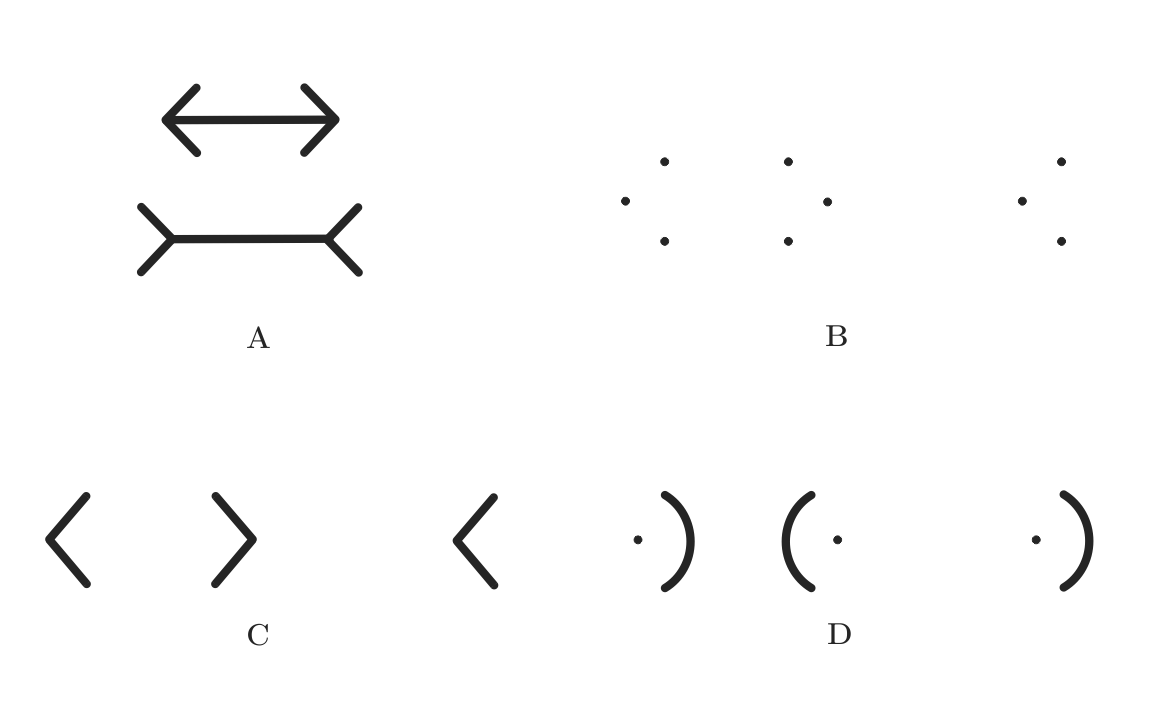
The classic Müller-Lyer figures (A) and three modifications (having no shaft line) of the Brentano versions of illusory figures comprising different contextual flanks: separate dots (B), the Müller-Lyer wings (C), and arcs of a circle (D, distances between the points seem to be different)

According to the so-called centroid hypothesis, judgments of distance between visual objects are strongly affected by the neural computation of the centroids of the luminance profiles of the objects, in that the position of the centroid of an image determines its perceived location. Morgan et al., suggest that the visual procedure of centroid extraction is causally related to a spatial pooling of the positional signals evoked by the neighboring object parts. Though the integration coarsens the positional acuity, such pooling seems to be quite biologically substantiated since it allows fast and reliable assessment of the location of the visual object as whole, irrespective of its size, the shape complexity, and illumination conditions. Concerning the Müller-Lyer and similar illusions, the pattern of neural excitation evoked by contextual flank (e.g., the Müller-Lyer wings themselves) overlaps with that caused by the stimulus terminator (e.g., the wings apex), thereby leading (due to the shift of the centroid of summed excitation) to its perceptual displacement. The crucial point in the centroid explanation regarding the positional shifts of the stimulus terminators in the direction of the centroids of contextual flanks was confirmed in psychophysical examination of illusory figures with rotating distractors. The relative displacement of all stimulus terminators leads to misjudgment of distances between them; that is, the illusion occurs as a side effect due to necessarily low spatial resolution of the neural mechanism of assessment of the relative location of the visual objects. Besides, it was shown that well-known asymmetry in manifestation of the wings-in and wings-out modifications of the Müller-Lyer illusion can be successfully explained by supplemental effects of the filled-space illusion.

== Historical research ==
Around the turn of the 20th century, W. H. R. Rivers wrote that indigenous people of the Australian Murray Island were less susceptible to the Müller-Lyer illusion than were Europeans. Rivers suggested that this difference may be because Europeans live in more rectilinear environments than the islanders. Similar results were also observed by John W. Berry in his work on Inuit, urban Scots, and the Temne people in the 1960s.

In 1963, Segall, Campbell and Herskovitz compared susceptibility to four different visual illusions in three population samples of Caucasians, twelve of Africans, and one from the Philippines. For the Müller-Lyer illusion, the mean fractional misperception of the length of the line segments varied from 1.4% to 20.3%. The three European-derived samples were the three most susceptible samples, while the San foragers of the Kalahari desert were the least susceptible.

In 1965, following a debate between Donald T. Campbell and Melville J. Herskovits on whether culture can influence such basic aspects of perception such as the length of a line, they suggested that their student Marshall Segall investigate the problem. In their definitive paper of 1966, they investigated seventeen cultures and showed that people in different cultures differ substantially on how they experience the Müller-Lyer stimuli. They wrote that "European and American city dwellers have a much higher percentage of rectangularity in their environments than non-Europeans and so are more susceptible to that illusion."

They also used the word "carpentered" for the environments that Europeans mostly live in - characterized by straight lines, right angles, and square corners.

These conclusions were challenged in later work by Gustav Jahoda, who compared members of an African tribe living in a traditional rural environment with members of same group living in African cities. Here, no significant difference in susceptibility to the M-L illusion was found. Subsequent work by Jahoda suggested that retinal pigmentation may have a role in the differing perceptions on this illusion, and this was supported later by Pollack (1970).

A later study was conducted in 1978 by Ahluwalia on children and young adults from Zambia. Subjects from rural areas were compared with subjects from urban areas. The subjects from urban areas were shown to be considerably more susceptible to the illusion, as were younger subjects. While this by no means confirms the carpentered world hypothesis as such, it provides evidence that differences in the environment can create differences in the perception of the Müller-Lyer illusion, even within a given culture. Experiments have been reported suggesting that pigeons perceive the standard Müller-Lyer illusion, but not the reversed. Experiments on parrots have also been reported with similar results.

== Further examples ==
A three-dimensional Müller-Lyer illusion. Although the spines of the three depicted books are spaced exactly the same distance apart, the gap on the left appears significantly shorter than the one on the right.

The point located exactly in the middle of the horizontal line segment is perceived as being shifted strongly toward the acute angles (arrowhead). Acute angles appear to shorten the line segment, whereas obtuse angles (arrow tail/nock) appear to lengthen it. This variant of the Müller-Lyer illusion is known as the Judd illusion.

Another variant: The blue line segment appears longer than the red one. In this instance, the diagonal blue line is perceived as longer than the diagonal red line.
