= Alexander Whyte =

Scottish divine

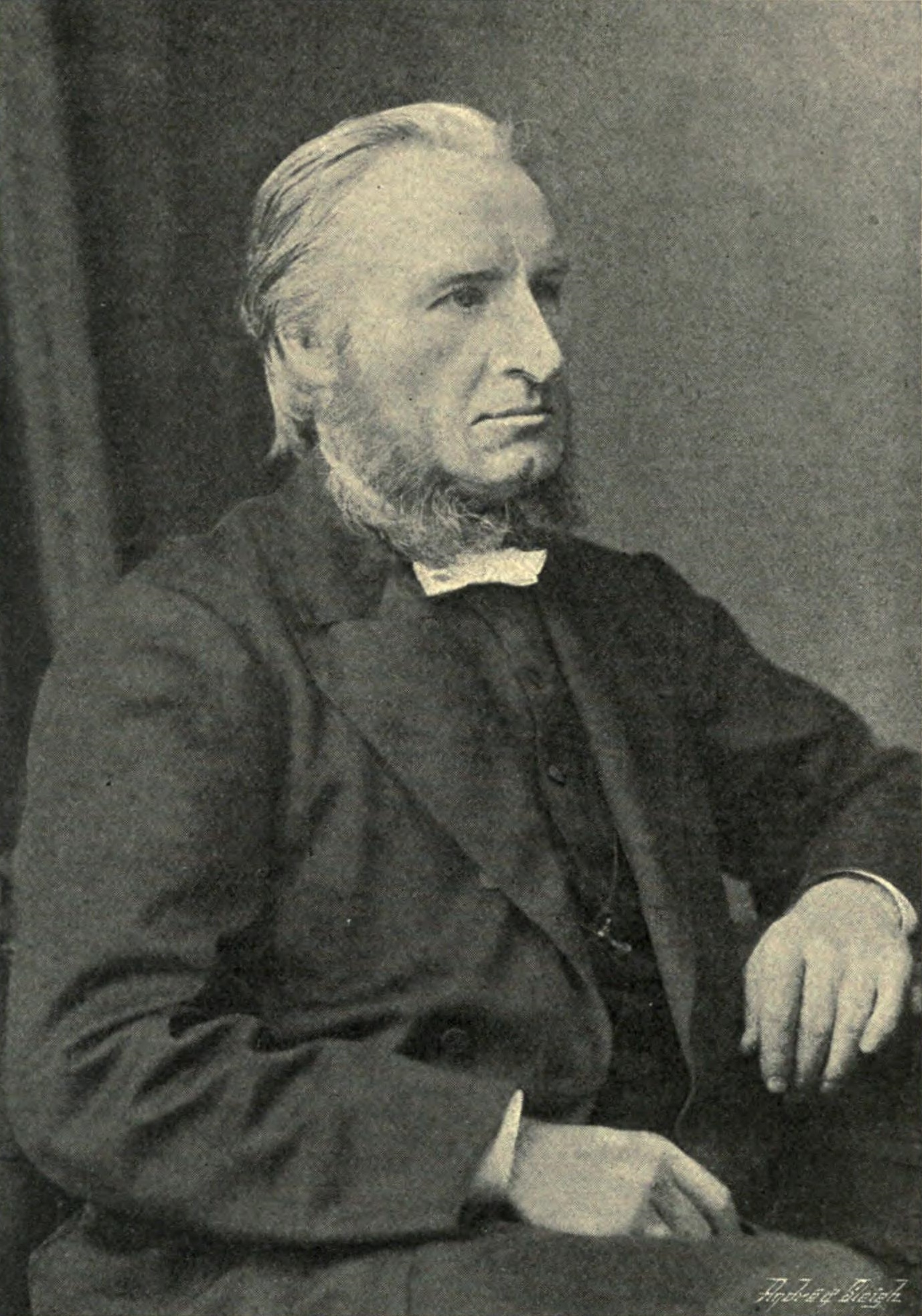
Portrait of Whyte, by John Moffat.

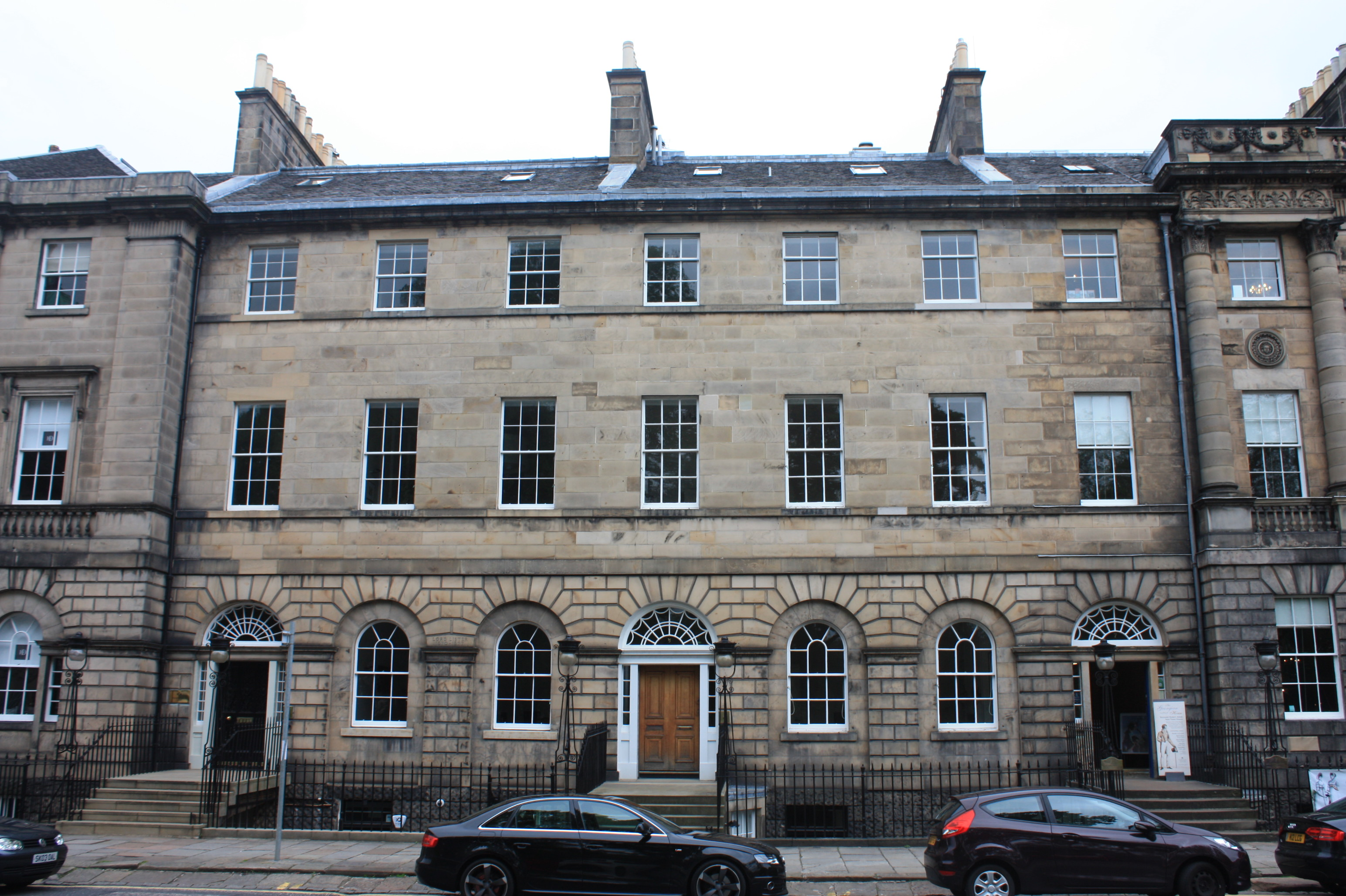
7 Charlotte Square, Edinburgh (right)

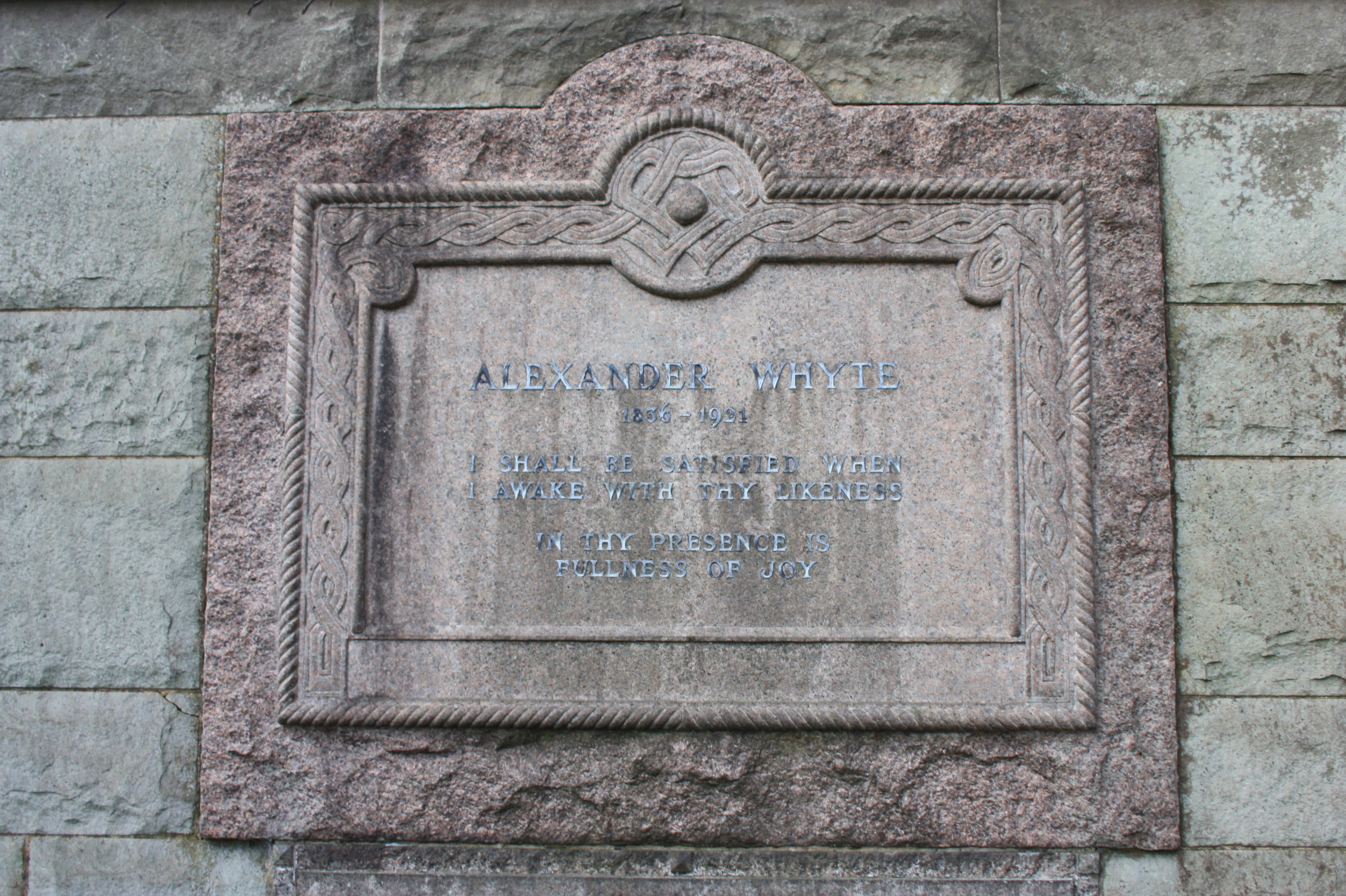
The grave of Rev Dr Alexander Whyte, Dean Cemetery, Edinburgh

Rev Alexander Whyte D.D., LL.D. (13 January 1836 – 6 January 1921) was a Scottish divine. He was Moderator of the General Assembly of the Free Church of Scotland in 1898.

== Life ==
He was born in Kirriemuir, Forfarshire to Janet Thomson, an unmarried girl. Janet declined to marry Alexander's father, John Whyte, who thereafter went to America. She did however give Alexander his father's surname. His mother joined the Free Church of Scotland at the Disruption of 1843. In 1848 he began an apprenticeship as a cobbler. In 1854 he took on a role as schoolteacher at Padanaram in Forfar and the following year moved to teach in Airlie. In Airlie the local minister taught him Latin and Greek, enabling him to apply for university

He studied divinity at the University of Aberdeen and then at New College, Edinburgh graduating in 1866. This was in part funded by his estranged father. His half-sister, Elizabeth Whyte, came to join him from America to help him keep house. There she met his colleague, Rev Thomas Macadam, whom she married.

Whyte entered the ministry of the Free Church of Scotland and after serving as colleague in Free St John's, Glasgow (1866–1870), removed to Edinburgh as colleague and successor to Rev Dr Robert Candlish at Free St George's. In 1909 he succeeded Dr Marcus Dods as principal, and professor of New Testament literature, at New College, Edinburgh.

He was an active educator and author and published widely on subjects ranging from John Bunyan's Pilgrim's Progress to St. Teresa of Avila, John Law, and Jakob Böhme. He was also an ecumenicist, maintaining a cordial correspondence with Cardinal Newman and publishing a selection of his work. He became a member of the general committee of the recently established Edinburgh Social Union in 1885.

Whyte lived in a huge townhouse 7 Charlotte Square, in Edinburgh's First New Town. The house is now owned by the National Trust for Scotland and open to the public as The Georgian House, Edinburgh.

He retired from the ministry of Free St George's in 1916, and from his position as principal of New College in 1918. He lived in Buckinghamshire from around 1915 and died there. However he was returned to Edinburgh for burial. He is buried near the north-west corner of the first northern extension to Dean Cemetery.

A memorial to Whyte in St George's Free Church in Edinburgh was designed by Sir Robert Lorimer.

== Family ==
In 1881 he was married to Jane Elizabeth Barbour (1861-1944). Their son Robert Barbour Whyte was killed in the First World War. Their eldest son (Alexander) Frederick Whyte was a journalist and politician who received a knighthood. Their daughter Janet Chance was a feminist author and campaigner for sex education, birth control, and access to abortion.

== Honours ==
In December 1909, the Town Council of Edinburgh awarded him Freedom of the City.

== Artistic recognition ==
He was portrayed by John Moffat and by Sir James Guthrie.

== Works ==
- (1883). A Commentary on the Shorter Catechism.
- (1893). Characters and Characteristics of William Law.
- (1893–1908). John Bunyan Characters [4 Vols.]
- (1894). Samuel Rutherford and Some of His Correspondents.
- (1895). An Appreciation of Jacob Behmen.
- (1895). Lancelot Andrewes and his Private Devotions
- (1895). The Four Temperaments.
- (1896–1902). Bible Characters [6 vols.]
- (1897). Santa Teresa.
- (1898). Father John of the Greek Church.
- (1898). The Principles of Protestantism.
- (1898). Sir Thomas Browne, an Appreciation.
- (1898). An Appreciation of Browne's Religio Medici.
- (1901). Newman: An Appreciation in Two Lectures.
- (1903). Bishop Butler.
- (1903). The Apostle Paul.
- (1905). The Walk, Conversation and Character of Jesus Christ Our Lord.
- (1911). James Fraser, Laird of Brea.
- (1915). Thirteen Appreciations.
