= Ideal Marriage: Its Physiology and Technique =

Book by Theodoor Hendrik van de Velde

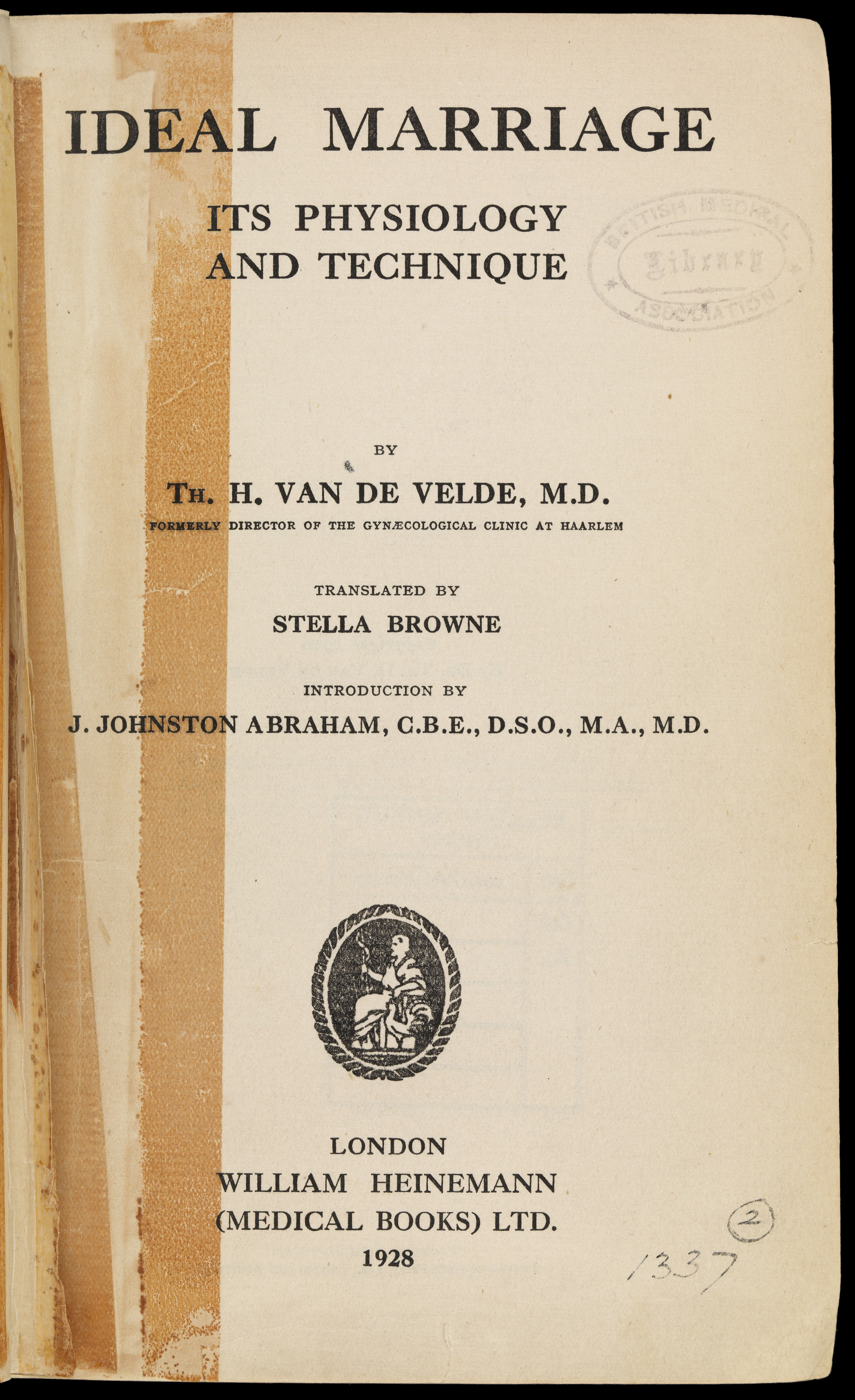
- Author: Theodoor Hendrik van de Velde
- Language: English
- Publication date: 1926
- Publication place: United Kingdom

Ideal Marriage: Its Physiology and Technique is a famous popular scientific treatise and self-help book published in London in 1926 by Dutch gynecologist Theodoor Hendrik van de Velde, retired director of the Gynecological Clinic in Haarlem, and "one of the major writers on human sexuality during the early twentieth century" (Frayser & Whitby, p. 300). It was the best-known work on its subject for several decades, and was reprinted 46 times in the original edition. After World-War Two, it sold over a half-million copies. A revised edition was published in 1965, and a subsequent one in 2000 (Melody & Pearson, p. 96).

It proclaimed the "critical goal of marriage consists of sexual pleasure shared by husband and wife" (Melody and Person, p. 93). A 2000 edition of the book described itself as concentrating "on the cultivation of the technique of eroticism as an art in marriage."

Frederica Mathewes-Green, in the National Review, described it as

the best-selling sex manual of all time. Over half a million copies were sold in the United States alone, and it enjoyed equal success in Europe. ...This is not a prude's book. Young couples who grab a used copy off the Internet may have even as much fun with it as their great-grandparents did.

The first printing had an insert: "The sale of this book is strictly limited to members of the medical profession, Psychoanalysts, Scholars, and to such adults as may have a definite position in the field of Physiological, Psychological, or Social Research." It was placed on the Index Librorum Prohibitorum in 1931.

== Contemporary Reviews ==
- Sullivan, Harry Stack (1929), "Review of Ideal Marriage: Its Physiology and Technique. by Th. H. Van De Velde, M. D. Translated by Stella Browne. Introduction by J. Johnston Abraham, M. D. (London: William Heinemann, 1928, 323 pp.)", American Journal of Psychiatry, pp. 218–23.
- Laipson (11 May 1931), "Connubial Hygiene — Review of Marie Carmichael Stopes's Married Love and Ideal Marriage, Its Physiology & Technique by Dr. Th. H. Van de Velde", Time, archived from the original on September 30, 2007, "he analyzes and describes the minutiae of male and female physiological activities pertaining to sexual activities. Incidentally, he defines a kiss 'an irregular intermittent pneumatic massage.' …contained graphs depicting the comparative trajectories of women's and men's sexual excitement."
