= Alice Jenkins =

British activist

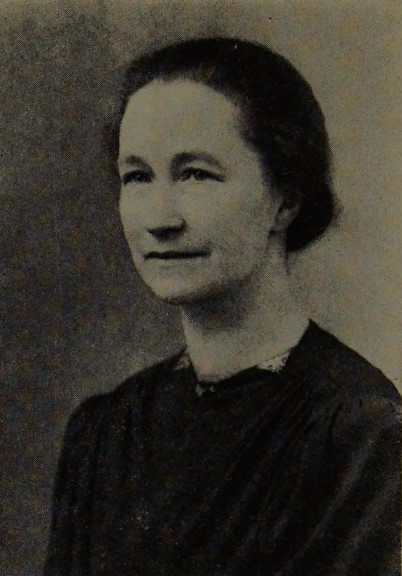
- Born: Alice Glyde; 4 December 1886; Ilkley, England, United Kingdom of Great Britain and Ireland
- Died: 25 December 1967 (aged 81); Roehampton, England, United Kingdom
- Known for: Co-founded the Abortion Law Reform Association

Alice Jenkins or Alice Brook; born Alice Glyde (4 December 1886 – 25 December 1967) was a British abortion-rights campaigner. She co-founded the Abortion Law Reform Association, which reformed UK abortion law. Her book "Law For The Rich" proved pivotal in the creation of the UK's 1967 Abortion Act that made abortion accessible in mainland Britain eight days before she died.

== Biography ==
Jenkins was born, Alice Glyde, on 2 November in 1887. Her mother, Sarah Jane Glyde, had six children and they all became involved in local politics. The family were abandoned by their father and many of the children worked in local mills. By 1911 Alice Glyde was working as a teacher in a municipal school in Bradford. Her brother, Charles Augustus Glyde, was a leading figure within socialist politics in Bradford. Alice, her sisters and sister-in-law, were all active suffragettes in Keighley and Bradford. In April 1912 she married William James Jenkins in Bradford and the following year they moved to Ealing. They had three children.

On 17 February 1936, Jenkins along with Janet Chance and Stella Browne began the Abortion Law Reform Association (ALRA). At the end of their first year they had 35 new members, and by 1939 they had almost 400. The membership were gathered from the working class using labour groups and women’s branches of the co-operative movement. These women wanted the privileges that “moneyed classes had enjoyed for years.”

The ALRA was very active between 1936 and 1939 sending speakers around the country to talk about Labour and Equal Citizenship and attempted to have letters and articles published in newspapers. They were in the frame when a member of the ALRA’s Medico-Legal Committee received the case of a fourteen-year-old girl who had been raped, and she received a termination of this pregnancy from Dr. Joan Malleson, a progenitor of the ALRA.

Jenkins wrote an important book titled Law for the Rich which was published in 1960. Her book drew attention to the double standards that faced women with unwanted pregnancies. Abortion was illegal so many women had to give birth to unplanned children, however rich women could persuade their private doctors that their mental health was at risk. The doctors were then able to carry out an abortion that was denied to most women in Britain. Jenkins illustrated her arguments with anecdotes about poor women and their inability to control their fertility.

The ALRA's major victory was to gain the support of the liberal politician David Steel. He was a liberal MP who had been lucky enough to win a third chance of placing a private members bill through the House of Commons. He rejected a call to amend the rights of plumbers and homosexuals and decided to reform the laws of abortion. He cites Alice Jenkins' argument in her book "Law For The Rich" as being pivotal in his decision. Steele put forward a private members bill that was backed by the government and it resulted in the 1967 Abortion Act.

== Death and legacy ==
Jenkins died on Christmas Day 1967. She was the only surviving member of the original ALRA executive and she saw the Abortion Act pass into UK law eight days before she died.
