= Anne Quesney =

Anne Quesney is the director of the pro-choice campaign group Abortion Rights. Prior to this she was an international campaigns coordinator for Landmine Action, also campaigns coordinator for the National Abortion Campaign, and education development officer for Education for Choice. She has also written for the New Statesman.
