= Cecile Booysen =

South African physician and peace activist

Dr Cécile Booysen M.R.C.S. L.R.C.P.
- Born: 1895; South Africa
- Died: 7 April 1937 (aged 41–42)
- Education: King's College London
- Occupations: Doctor, peace activist, promoter of birth control
- Employer: Goswell Women's Welfare Centre
- Organization(s): Medical Peace Campaign (founder and secretary)

Cécile Booysen (1895 – 7 April 1937) was a South African doctor, peace activist, and promoter of birth control. She was the founder of the Goswell Women's Welfare Centre and the Medical Peace Campaign.

== Life ==
Booysen was born in 1895, the daughter of a South African farmer. Determined to become a doctor, she borrowed money to travel to England, studying at King's College and Charing Cross Hospital. After obtaining the M.R.C.S.; and L.R.C.P. diplomas in 1926, Booysen became house-surgeon at Charing Cross, and then took up general practice in North-West London, serving also for a time as clinical assistant at the Paddington Green Children's Hospital and the Royal Free Hospital. Booysen shared a practice with Joan Malleson, a close friend and fellow doctor and reproductive rights advocate.

In 1935 Booysen founded a voluntary birth control clinic known as the Goswell Women's Welfare Centre in Finsbury, then a poor and overcrowded district of London. The practice was described as "extremely and unusually friendly", and Booysen as having a "great understanding of working class women". She was a member of the Society for the Provision of Birth Control Clinics and the Medical Women's Federation. Booysen was one among a number of prominent women doctors who conducted medical trials to establish the efficacy and safety of contraceptive products. As Caroline Rusterholz has written:

Booysen was tasked with gathering information on quinine, a drug first used to treat malaria but which had been used as a spermicidal jelly. She presented a report based on the collection of results of the original work by various research workers and on her own clinical experience. The recommendation made by Booysen was to give up quinine as a chemical component of spermicide jelly due to its irritating effect, lack of efficiency, difficulty in dissolving and side effects.

Booysen was associated with Labour and left wing politics. After attending the Brussels Peace Congress in 1936, Booysen founded and worked actively for the Medical Peace Campaign, as honorary secretary. The Medical Peace Campaign, she wrote, was formed on the basis that:

The medical profession has an unenviable knowledge of the bitter wastage of human life, which is the basis of constructing modern warfare, and is earnestly looking to the establishment of constructive peace and security.

In 1936 she was elected an associate member of the City Division of the British Medical Association, and served as representative of the St. Paneras Division at the Annual Meeting at Oxford. She was said to be a woman of outstanding vigour and personality, whose untimely death has caused grief to many friends.

== Death and legacy ==
Cécile Booysen died on 7 April 1937 after an illness of five weeks, at the age of 42.

In The Lancet, Professor John A. Ryle wrote:

The news of Dr. Cécile Booysen’s death will have brought grief and distress to all who knew her. Among the many able women doctors in London, she belonged to a group and a generation which stands particularly high in my estimation, and established unobtrusively a position which will cause her to be long remembered and revered. It was a privilege to meet her in consultation and to observe the care and thought and consideration which she devoted to her patients and which in turn earned their evident devotion to her. She was the organising secretary and inspiration of the Medical Peace Campaign in this country, and in her conduct of its affairs she must have expended a great deal of the energies of her later months. Whatever success attends this movement in the years to come—and it must be recognised as one of the first serious attempts to investigate the psychological causes and consequences of war, and to study and anticipate the medical problems associated with war—a very great measure of that success must be attributed to her self-imposed task. That task had for its goal the better and safer world for which we all hope but few so assiduously strive.”

Ryle continued promoting the Medical Peace Campaign following Booysen's death, noting that "It was chiefly through her inspiration and energy that the work of such a campaign was conceived and initiated". Peace News remembered Booysen as one who "felt the need for rousing her profession to work for the prevention of war as they would for the prevention of an epidemic":

She has been described as one “who loved life and hated those who produce pain, superstition, and ugliness,” and her death at little more than forty years of age has deprived the medical profession of a valiant worker for peace.
