= Joyce Daniel =

British birth control proponent

- Born: 10 May 1890; North Malvern
- Died: 29 January 1985 (aged 94); Eltham
- Alma mater: Milton Mount College
- Employer: National Birth Control Committee
- Spouse(s): Archibald Daniel

Joyce Daniel (10 May 1890–29 January 1985) created early birth control clinics in Wales for what is now named the Family Planning Association.

== Life ==
Alice Amelia Hyrons and Walter Lee, who was a church minister, had three daughters and Joyce was their last. She was educated in Kent before she took work in the banking industry in the West Midlands. After she married a widower on 23 April 1918 she moved to Pontypridd in South Wales where her husband and his son lived. Her husband was a solicitor and they had two sons in 1919 and 1922. Her husband's first wife had died in childbirth.

Daniel came to the notice of Janet Chance because she organised the dispersion of maternity parcels which were donated by the Lord Mayor's Distress Fund. Janet Chance contacted her and told her of her failure to raise any support in the area to establish a birth control clinic in Pontypridd. Daniel was not deterred and she invited the influential women around to her house where it was agreed that a clinic was needed and that they would organise and fund it. The local authority health committee refused permission for one of their rooms to be used, but Daniel lobbied the committee members and the decision was reversed.

This was the first successful clinic. Marie Stopes had a caravan that had recently toured South Wales and a clinic had opened in Abertillery Hospital in 1925 but it soon closed. Daniel's efforts were aided by a government memo that authorised (but did not encourage) local authorities to provide birth control advice. Memo 153/MCW only allowed this where further pregnancies would be injurious to health.

The National Birth Control Association recognised Daniel as their South Wales organiser and under her leadership Medical Officers and councils were lobbied. Memo 153/MCW gave authority for medical professionals to take action but they were not obliged. Moreover, Daniel and her supporters could not advertise this service as it was only meant to be available where a woman's health was at risk. Professionals were not keen and women would exaggerate their ignorance about birth control techniques. Daniel reported that Medical Officers failed to tell their doctors that the birth control service was available. Some doctors were opposed to the whole idea and only referred cases that were "dire". Patients reported that Doctors would warn women that they should not have any more children but they offered no advice to support couples in avoiding further pregnancies.

By 1939 there were over a dozen clinics in the South Wales valleys following Pontypridd's lead and they were created by local authorities. Daniel wanted to avoid seeing women exhausted by large families and illegal abortions. She served for thirty years and her donation of unpaid overtime was noted. She was opposed to abortion and she was a committed member of her local church.

She died in 1985 at Eltham and her ashes were buried in Pontypridd.
