= Hugh Northcote =

Hugh Northcote (1 November 1868 – 12 August 1933) was an Anglican clergyman in New Zealand and writer on sex.

Hugh Northcote was the son of Henry Moubray Northcote and Elinor Mallet. He was born in Devonshire, England. His family emigrated to Canterbury, New Zealand, where after graduating with a first in classics from Canterbury University College he became an Anglican priest. In 1903 he and his family went to England, where he lived until 1927, when he returned to New Zealand.

Northcote corresponded with sexologist Havelock Ellis, and helped to popularise the term 'inversion' for homosexuality.

== Works ==
- Ancient and modern changes in women's social position, Christchurch, N.Z.: [H. Northcote], 1896.
- Christianity and sex problems, Philadelphia: Davis, 1906. 2nd ed., 1916.
- Edith Cavell's last thought and other poems, London: Kegan Paul, Trench, Trubner, 1918.
- The social value of the study of sex psychology, London: British Society for the Study of Sex Psychology, 1920.
