= Janet Chance =

British feminist and reproductive rights activist

- Born: 10 February 1886; Edinburgh, Scotland
- Died: 18 December 1953 (aged 67)
- Notable work: The Cost of English Morals, Intellectual Crime, The Romance of Reality
- Spouse: Clinton Chance
- Parent(s): Alexander Whyte, Jane Elizabeth Barbour

Janet Chance (10 February 1886 – 18 December 1953) was a British feminist writer, sex education advocate and birth control and abortion law reformer.

== Life ==
Born in Edinburgh, Scotland to Scottish Calvinist minister and New College principal Alexander Whyte and Jane Elizabeth Barbour, Janet Whyte married successful chemical firm owner and stockbroker Clinton Frederick Chance in 1912. The couple soon moved to London, England where they both became enthusiastic advocates and financial supporters of the English Malthusian League and the efforts of American reformer Margaret Sanger and the birth control movement. Despite suffering from intermittent bouts of depression, Janet Chance threw herself into work becoming a member of the Workers' Birth Control Group (WBCG), founded in 1924 by birth control advocates Stella Browne and Dora Russell to give women wider access to birth control information. Chance was so moved by the plight of poor and working-class women who had no knowledge of sex and reproduction and no access to the latest available contraceptive methods that she helped run a sex education centre in the East End of London. She gave a report, "A Marriage Education Centre in London," at the Third Congress of the World League for Sexual Reform in London in September 1929.

In 1930 she contacted Joyce Daniel in Pontypridd who was supplying parcels to new mothers funded by the Lord Mayor's Distress Fund. She encouraged Daniel to campaign for a birth control clinic and she was successful.

Convinced that a large part of the problem lay in the repressed, provincial British view of sex and reproduction, Chance wrote several books on the importance of acknowledging women's sexuality and educating them about it, reflecting, albeit in modest terms, the views of the sex reform movement. These included The Cost of English Morals, which was banned in Ireland, Intellectual Crime, and The Romance of Reality

Chance was increasingly convinced that a large part of the problem lay in the fact that birth control options, for poor women especially, were limited; and in many cases their only option was abortion. Abortion was illegal in all cases in Great Britain under the 1861 Offences against the Person Act, and was made legal only to save the life of the mother under the 1929 Infant Life Act. To this end, in 1936 Chance helped found and support the Abortion Law Reform Association (ALRA) with WBCG colleague Alice Jenkins and the physician Joan Malleson. Working through Women's Co-operative Guilds and the Labour Party, the ALRA sought to pressure politicians to support the notion that women should have the power to decide if their own pregnancies would be terminated.

During the late 1930s, Janet Chance also worked to help get refugees out of Germany, Austria and other Nazi-occupied nations, even traveling to Vienna and Prague in the summer of 1938. Among those she was trying to help were Austrian actress Lilia Skala, Ludwig Chiavacci and Sidonie Furst. She also continued to chair the ALRA through World War II, helping to keep the organization alive and ready for a post-war resurgence. But after the war, the ALRA shifted from pressuring Labour Party members, to campaigning more generally for a new parliamentary law by pushing for a private member's bill. However, they were unsuccessful until the 1967 passage of an Abortion bill.

== Family ==
In August 1953, Chance's husband Clinton died. Janet Chance, whose battle with depression intensified had to be hospitalized. On 18 December, four months after Clinton's death, Janet Chance threw herself from a window at London's University College Hospital and died.
