= Theodoor Hendrik van de Velde =

- Born: 12 February 1873
- Died: 27 April 1937 (aged 64)

Theodoor Hendrik van de Velde (12 February 1873, Leeuwarden – 27 April 1937 near Locarno in a plane crash) was a Dutch physician and gynæcologist who served as director at the Gynæcological Institute in Haarlem.

== Biography ==
His 1926 book Het volkomen huwelijk (The Perfect Marriage) made him an instant international celebrity. The book advocated knowledge and sensuality in erotic life. In Germany, Die vollkommene Ehe reached its 42nd printing in 1932, in spite of the fact that it was placed on the list of forbidden books, Index Librorum Prohibitorum, by the Roman Catholic Church.

German-American sex therapist and Holocaust survivor Dr. Ruth Westheimer, known popularly as Dr. Ruth, has said that it was the first book on the subject of sex that she ever had an opportunity to read a few pages of, when she was a ten-year-old child in Frankfurt, Germany.

In Protestant and social democratic Sweden, Det fulländade äktenskapet was widely known although regarded as pornographic and unsuitable for young readers long into the 1960s. The English translation, Ideal Marriage: Its Physiology and Technique, was the best-known work on its subject for several decades, and was reprinted 46 times in the original edition, selling well over a half million copies.

He is credited with showing in 1905 that women only ovulate once per menstrual cycle. This contributed to the improvement of calendar-based methods of birth control, and later to the creation of other fertility awareness systems.

Wilhelm Reich mentions Van de Velde in his 1945 essay Listen, Little Man! (German: Rede an den kleinen Mann): You say: 'Sexuality is a petit-bourgeois invention, it's the economic factors that count'. And you read Van de Velde's book on love technique. (1948 English translation by Theodore Peter Wolfe, Penguin books edition 1975, page 38).
