= Tysiąc v Poland =

Tysiąc v. Poland (Application no. 5410/03) was a case decided by the European Court of Human Rights (ECtHR) in 2007. A pregnant woman from Poland, diagnosed with a severe eye disease, tried to get an abortion to avoid an escalation of her disease. Her requests were rejected by several medical doctors and she underwent labor of her third child. Her condition later deteriorated, and she sued one of the doctors. Her criminal lawsuits were rejected in Poland and the case was appealed to the European Court of Human Rights, which accepted one part of the complaint, and the plaintiff was awarded damages.

== Background ==
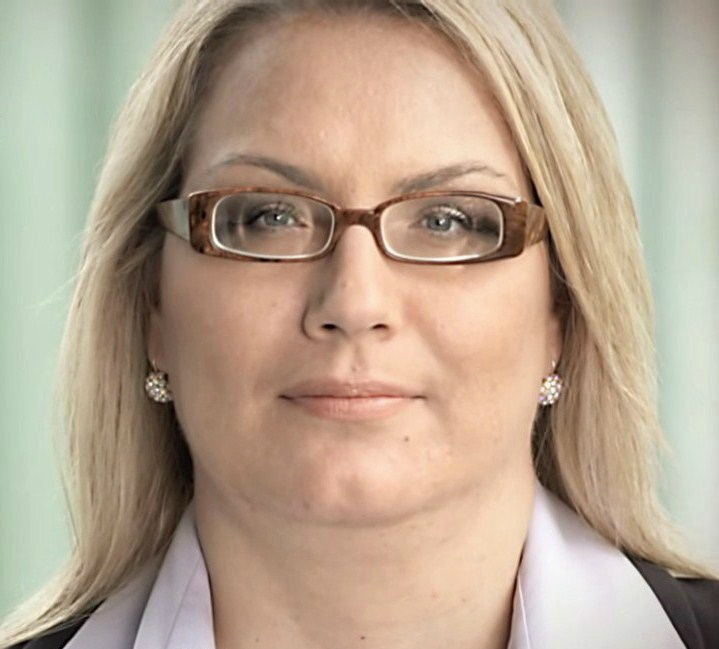
Alicja Tysiąc

Ms. A. Tysiąc suffered from severe myopia. During her third pregnancy in 2000, she was examined by three ophthalmologists. All of them concluded that, due to pathological changes in her retina, the pregnancy and delivery constituted a risk to her eyesight. However, they refused to issue a certificate for the pregnancy to be terminated, despite Tysiąc's requests, saying that the risk of the retina detaching itself due to the strain caused by giving birth could be avoided if Mrs. Tysiąc delivered through cesarean section. Subsequently, Ms. Tysiąc sought further medical advice. A general practitioner (GP) issued a certificate stating that the third pregnancy constituted a threat to Ms. Tysiąc's health as there was a risk of rupture of the uterus, given her two previous deliveries by caesarean section. She further referred to Ms. Tysiąc's short-sightedness and to significant pathological changes in her retina. These considerations, according to the GP, also required that Ms. Tysiąc should avoid physical strain which in any case would hardly be possible as at that time the applicant was raising two small children on her own. Ms. Tysiąc understood that on the basis of this certificate she would be able to terminate her pregnancy lawfully.

Subsequently, Ms. Tysiąc contacted a state hospital, the Clinic of Gynaecology and Obstetrics in Warsaw, in the area to which she was assigned on the basis of her residence, with a view to obtaining the termination of her pregnancy. On 26 April 2000 she had an appointment with dr Romuald Dębski, head of the Gynaecology and Obstetrics Department of the Clinic. Dębski examined her, but did not examine her ophthalmological records. Afterwards, he made a note on the back of the certificate issued by the GP that neither her short-sightedness nor her two previous deliveries by caesarean section constituted grounds for therapeutic termination of the pregnancy. He was of the view that, in these circumstances, the applicant should give birth by caesarean section.

As a result, Ms. Tysiąc's pregnancy was not terminated. She delivered the child by caesarean section in November 2000. Some time after the delivery, her eyesight deteriorated. On 11 January 2001 the social welfare centre issued a certificate to the effect that she was unable to take care of her children as she could not see from a distance of more than 1.5 metres.

Ms. Tysiąc lodged a criminal complaint against Romuald Dębski, stating that he had prevented her from having her pregnancy terminated on medical grounds as recommended by the GP and permissible as one of the exceptions to a general ban on abortion. She complained that, following the pregnancy and delivery, she had sustained severe bodily harm by way of almost complete loss of her eyesight. The investigation of the applicant's complaint was carried out by the Warsaw-Śródmieście District Prosecutor. The prosecutor heard evidence from the ophthalmologists who had examined the applicant during her pregnancy. They stated that she could have had a safe delivery by caesarean section. The prosecutor further requested the preparation of an expert report by a panel of three medical experts (ophthalmologist, gynaecologist and specialist in forensic medicine) from the Białystok Medical Academy. According to the report, the applicant's pregnancies and deliveries had not affected the deterioration of her eyesight. Given the serious nature of the applicant's sight impairment, the risk of retinal detachment had always been present and continued to exist, and the pregnancy and delivery had not contributed to increasing that risk. Furthermore, the experts found that in the applicant's case there had been no factors militating against the applicant's carrying her baby to term and delivering it. The criminal investigation against Dębski was therefore discontinued.

== Judgment ==
By 6 votes to 1, the court held that there was a violation of Article 8 ECHR (right to private life), as "it is not the Court's task in the present case to examine whether the Convention guarantees a right to have an abortion" and "it has not been demonstrated that Polish law as applied to the applicant's case contained any effective mechanisms capable of determining whether the conditions for obtaining a lawful abortion had been met in her case.... the provisions of the civil law on tort as applied by the Polish courts did not afford the applicant a procedural instrument by which she could have vindicated her right to respect for her private life. The civil law remedy was solely of a retroactive and compensatory character. It could only, and if the applicant had been successful, have resulted in the courts granting damages to cover the irreparable damage to her health which had come to light after the delivery.... Crucially, the examination of the circumstances of the case in the context of criminal investigations could not have prevented the damage to the applicant's health from arising. The same applies to disciplinary proceedings before the organs of the Chamber of Physicians." The court also ruled that there was no violation of Article 3 (no torture, inhuman or degrading treatment).

== See also ==
- Legal clinic
