= Joan Malleson =

British doctor and abortion advocate

Joan Graeme Malleson (née Billson; 4 June 1899 – 14 May 1956) was an English physician, specialist in contraception and prominent advocate of the legalisation of abortion.

== Life ==
Billson was born at Ulverscroft, Leicestershire. She was educated at Bedales School, where she became Head Girl, and studied medicine at University College, London from 1918, later moving to Charing Cross Hospital due to the hostility to female students she experienced at UCL. In 1923 she married the actor Miles Malleson; they divorced in 1940. She qualified in 1926 and worked for Holborn Borough Council and the West End Hospital for Nervous Diseases, developing an interest in the fields of fertility, reproduction and sexuality.

In 1931, while working for Ealing Borough Council, she became one of the first British doctors to provide birth control advice on behalf of a local authority. Malleson shared a practice with her close friend and colleague, Dr Cecile Booysen, which ended with Booysen's death in 1937. In 1935 she published The Principles of Contraception, a practical guide. She became a member of the executive committee of the National Birth Control Association (later the Family Planning Association). In 1936 the Abortion Law Reform Association was started by Alice Jenkins and Janet Chance. Malleson was amongst its more influential supporters.

She courted controversy by supporting the campaign to reform the abortion law. In 1938 she precipitated one of the most influential cases in British abortion law when she referred a pregnant fourteen-year-old rape victim to gynaecologist Aleck Bourne. He performed an abortion, then illegal, and was put on trial for it; the King v Alek Bourne trial. Malleson gave evidence at the trial and Bourne's acquittal set a precedent that doctors could not be prosecuted for performing an abortion in similar circumstances. Malleson was also a supporter of eugenics and member of the Eugenics Society. In 1950 she was appointed head of the contraceptive clinic at University College Hospital.

== Death ==
She died in 1956, at the age of 56, from a heart attack while swimming off Suva, Fiji.

Malleson had suffered with severe depression since the breakdown of her marriage and the birth of her second son. Because she had told them that "if her depression became unmanageable she would inject herself with a large dose of insulin and swim out to sea," her sons believe that her death was a suicide.
