= Abortion Rights (organisation) =

Advocacy organisation

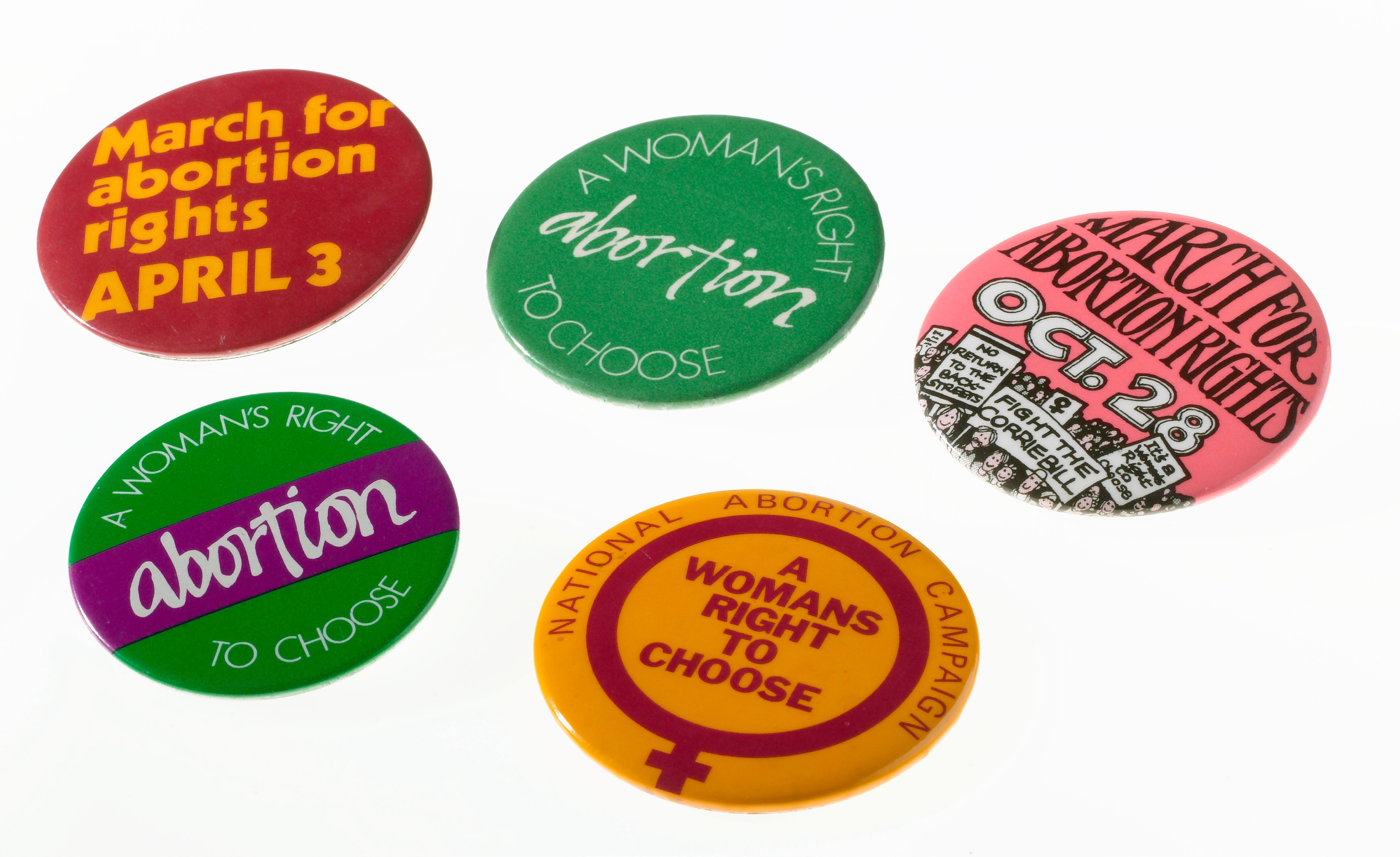
Badges from the 1970s campaigning to keep and expand the achievements of the ALRA

Abortion Rights is an advocacy organisation that promotes access to abortion in the United Kingdom. It was formed in 2003 by the merger of the Abortion Law Reform Association (ALRA) and the National Abortion Campaign (NAC). The ALRA campaigned effectively after World War II for the elimination of legal obstacles to abortion and the peak of its work was the Abortion Act 1967.

== History ==
The "Abortion Law Reform Association" was founded in the United Kingdom in 1936 by Janet Chance, Alice Jenkins, Joan Malleson and Stella Browne. Its intention was to change attitudes and the law to allow access to abortion in the United Kingdom. Janet Chance created the funding and the marketing whilst Alice Brook Jenkins was the honorary secretary. Jenkins created a network of supporters.

At the end of their first year they had 35 new members, and by 1939 they had almost 400. The membership were gathered from the working class using labour groups and women's branches of the co-operative movement. These women wanted the privileges that “moneyed classes had enjoyed for years.”

The ALRA was very active between 1936 and 1939 sending speakers around the country to talk about Labour and Equal Citizenship and attempted to have letters and articles published in newspapers. They were in the frame when a member of the ALRA's Medico-Legal Committee received the case of a fourteen-year-old girl who had been raped, and she received a termination of this pregnancy from Dr. Joan Malleson, a progenitor of the ALRA.

Alice Jenkins wrote an important book titled "Law For The Rich" which was published in 1960. Her book drew attention to the double standards that faced women with unwanted pregnancies. Abortion was nominally illegal so many women had to give birth to unplanned children, however rich women could persuade their private doctors that their mental health was at risk. The doctors were then able to carry out an abortion that was denied to most women in Britain.

During the 1970s and 1980s there were several proposed amendment bills against the Abortion Act 1967, so in defense of the Abortion Act 1967, the National Abortion Campaign (NAC) was formed in 1975.

== Lobbying for change ==
Vera Houghton became the chair of the ALRA in 1963 and over the next seven years she led the organisation. The ALRA's turning point was to gain the support of the Liberal Party MP David Steel, who placed a private members bill through the House of Commons to reform the laws of abortion, choosing this issue over calls to instead amend the law on plumbers or the rights of homosexuals. He cites Alice Jenkins' argument in her book "Law For The Rich" as being pivotal in his decision. Steele put forward a private members bill that was backed by the government and it resulted in the 1967 Abortion Act.

In 1974 the ''Working Women's Charter" was developed by activists from the U.K. Women's Liberation and trade union movement. The charter was an attempt to bridge the gap between women's economic and social requirements, and included equal pay, an end to the glass ceiling, free contraception and access to abortion. In 1975, the Scottish politician James White introduced a bill in parliament to make abortion more difficult. A demonstration was arranged to protest at moves to restrict the then legal access to abortion. This demonstration led to the formation of National Abortion Campaign.

Abortion Rights was formed in 2003 by the merger of the Abortion Law Reform Association (ALRA) and the National Abortion Campaign (NAC). The organisation is led by Anne Quesnay.

== Scottish devolution ==
In 2016, abortion law was devolved to the Scottish Parliament in the Scotland Act 2016.

The devolved organisation Abortion Rights Scotland is a campaigning and advocacy organisation, taking part in an annual pro-choice demo in Edinburgh on the anniversary of the Abortion Act 1967, giving evidence to the Scottish Parliament for the Safe Access Zones Bill, and taking part in the debate on decriminalization of abortion in Scotland.

== See also ==
- National Abortion Rights Action League (NARAL) — American contemporary organisation
