= List of massacres in Peru =

The following is a list of notable massacres that have occurred in Peru (numbers may be approximate).

Name	Date	Location	Deaths	Notes
Punta Lobos massacre	1350 AD	Punta Lobos	200	Unexplained murders of approximately 200 fishermens in a giant human sacrifice ceremony by members of the powerful Chimu people
Battle of Cajamarca	November 16, 1532	Cajamarca	2,000	The Spanish killed thousands of Atahualpa's counselors, commanders, and unarmed attendants in the great plaza of Cajamarca, and caused his armed host outside the town to flee
1881 Lima anti-Chinese pogrom	January 16, 1881	Lima	2,500—3,750	After of the Sacking of Miraflores by the Chilean Army, the Peruvians witnessed the participation of Chinese on the Chilean side; in an act of revenge, a pogrom was planned by troops of the 8 batallions and civilians volunteers in the Barrio Chino and the surrounding areas of Lima before of the occupation in January 16.
Cerro Azul massacre	January 20, 1881	Cañete	500-1,000	Perpetrated by Afro-Peruvians against Chinese for collaborationism with the Chileans after the fall of Lima.
1881 Cañete anti-Chinese pogrom	February 12–15, 1881	Cañete Valley	500 - 1,500	In one 1881 pogrom in the Cañete Valley it is estimated that 500 to 1,500 Chinese were killed.
Matsés massacre	1964	Javary River area, Department of Loreto	unknown	Set of military bombings carried out by Peruvian Air Force against Matsés (also known as 'Mayoruna') communities in the northeast of the country in 1964, during the first presidency of Fernando Belaúnde. The number of deaths and injuries is unknown.
Limazo	February 3-5 1975	Lima	86	Several police and civil strikes against the government cause looting and fires in Lima. The armed forces suppress the rebels and strikers with violence and regain control of the city.
Lucanamarca massacre	April 3, 1983	Lucanamarca	69	Carried out by Shining Path
Socos Massacre	November 13, 1983	Town of Socos, Department of Ayacucho	32	Carried out by Peruvian Civil Guard
Soras massacre	July 16, 1984	Several localities in the province of Sucre, Department of Ayacucho	109-117	Carried out by Shining Path
Putis massacre	December 1984	Putis, Santillana District, Department of Ayacucho	123	Carried out by Peruvian Military Forces
Ashaninka genocide	July, 1985	Loreto, Madre de Dios, Ucayali and Junín	6,000	During the entire duration of the conflict, during which or 40 ashaninka communities vanished, 6.000 people were killed and 10.000 disappeared.
Accomarca massacre	August 14, 1985	Accomarca, Ayacucho	47-74	Carried out by Peruvian Military Forces
Peruvian prison massacres	June 1986	Prisons in Lima and Callao	300	Carried out by Peruvian Military Forces
Aucayacu massacre	August 6, 1986	Accomarca, José Crespo Y Castillo District	10	Carried out by Tupac Amaru Revolutionary Movement
Cayara massacre	May 14, 1988	Cayara District, Ayacucho	39	Carried out by Peruvian Military Forces
La Hoyada massacre	September 12, 1988	La Hoyoda, Pucallpa	8	Carried out by Shining Path
Pucallpa massacre	February 9, 1989	Pucallpa, Ucayali	9-30	Carried out by National Police of Peru
Tarapoto massacre	May 31, 1989	Tarapoto, Department of San Martín	8	Carried out by MRTA
Ccano massacre	February 23, 1991	Ccano, La Mar Province	32	Carried out by Shining Path
Santa Barbara massacre	July 4, 1991	Santa Barbara, Huancavelica	15	Carried out by Peruvian Army
Three Martyrs of Chimbote	August 9 - 25, 1991	Pariacoto and Riconada, Ancash	3	Murder of two Polish Franciscan priests and one Italian missionary priest by the Shining Path
Huayo massacre	October 10, 1991	Huayo	44	In which 44 persons were killed by Shining Path. Huayo was allegedly attacked merely for having formed civilian defense units.
Barrios Altos massacre	November 3, 1991	Lima	15	Carried out by government-affiliated Colina Group; 4 injured
Santa massacre	May 2, 1992	Santa Province, Ancash Region	9	Carried out by government-affiliated Colina Group
Frecuencia Latina bombing	June 5, 1992	Jesús María District, Lima	3	A Truck Bomb loaded with half a ton of dynamite, went to the front of a television station of channel Frecuencia 2 (renamed Latina Televisión in 2014) and exploded, destroying it
Tarata bombing	July 16, 1992	Tarata St., Miraflores, Lima	25	Two large truck bombs explode in the wealthy Miraflores District, killing 25, injuring 250 and damaging hundreds of houses and businesses. The communist group Shining Path claimed responsibility.
La Cantuta massacre	July 18, 1992	Lima	10	9 students and a professor were killed by government-affiliated Colina Group
2002 Lima bombing	March 20, 2002	Santiago de Surco, Lima	9	A Car bomb exploded at "El Polo", a mall in a wealthy district of Lima near the U.S. embassy
2002 Villa Virgen massacre	July 25, 2002	Villa Virgen district, Department of Cuzco	3	Murder of 3 Andean settlers by Ashánincas
Bagua massacre	June 5, 2009	Bagua, Amazonas department	33	33 people die during combat between Peru's Army and indigenous peoples in the Bagua
2017 Lima shooting	February 17–18, 2017	Independencia/San Martín de Porres and Los Olivos, Lima	6 (including the perpetrator)	Eduardo Glicerio Romero Naupay opened fire on shoppers at a shopping center, killing five and wounding nine others before being shot in the head by police
2019 El Agustino murder	December 22, 2019	El Agustino, Lima	4	Juan Huaripata Rosales murdered his partner and their three children, and wounded a fourth child who survived.
San Miguel del Ene massacre	May 23, 2021	San Miguel del Ene, Satipo Province	14-18	Carried out by the Militarized Communist Party of Peru
Ayacucho massacre	December 15, 2022	Ayacucho	10	Carried out by the Peruvian Army
Juliaca massacre	January 9, 2023	Juliaca, Puno	18	Carried out by the Peruvian National Police

== See also ==
- History of Peru
