= Aucayacu massacre =

1986 massacre of gay men and sex workers in Peru

- Part of 1980 – 2000 internal conflict in Peru
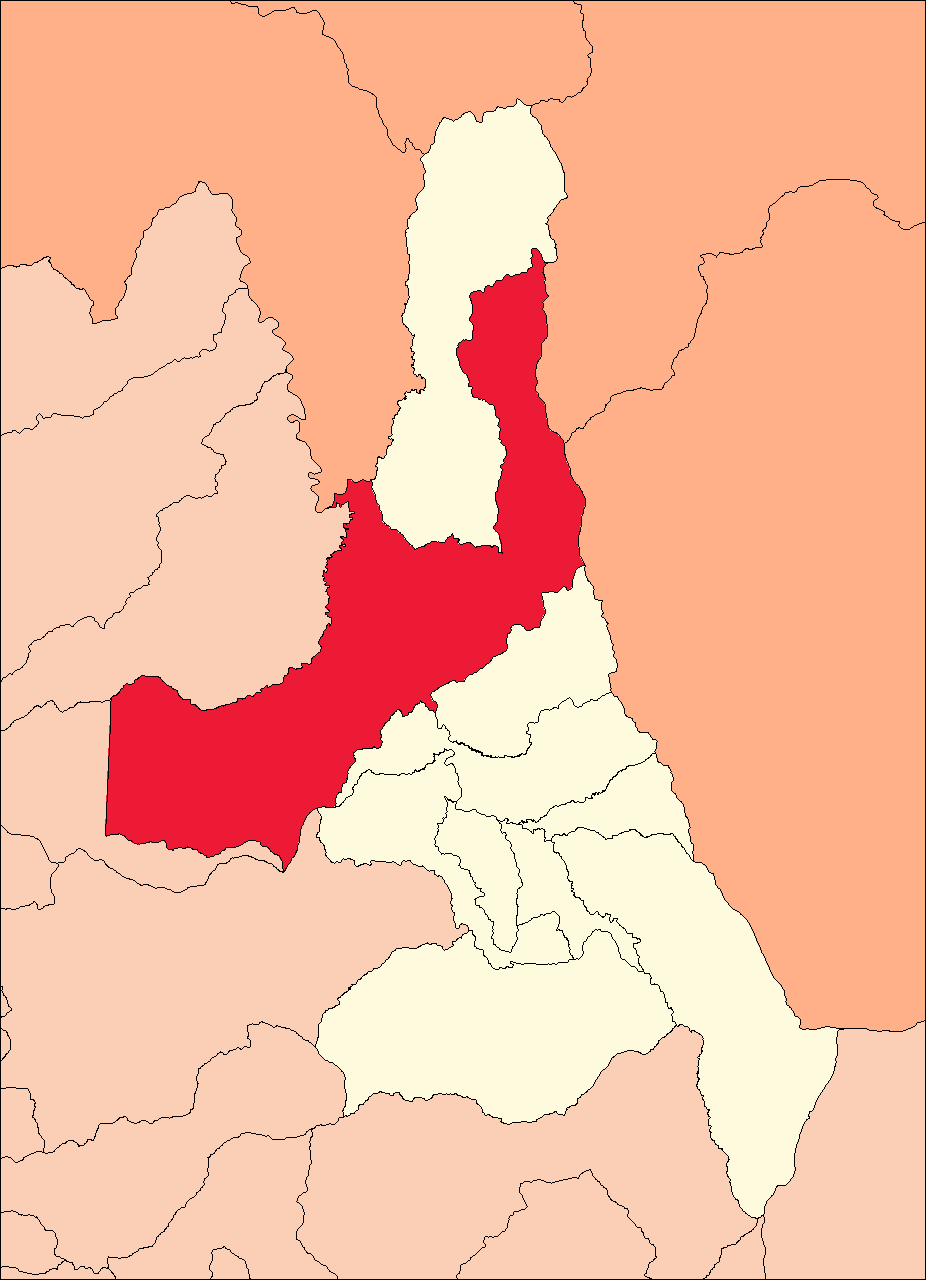
- Location of the José Crespo Y Castillo District, of which Aucayacu is the capital
- Location: 8.931369°S 76.130534°W; Aucayacu, José Crespo Y Castillo District, Leoncio Prado Province, Peru
- Date: 6 August 1986
- Target: Gay men; Sex workers
- Deaths: 10
- Perpetrator: Shining Path
- Motive: Homophobia; Misogyny; Anti-prostitution

The Aucayacu massacre was a selective massacre that occurred on 6 August 1986 in the Peruvian city of Aucayacu (Huánuco). The attack was directed at gay men and sex workers. Those responsible for the attack were members of Shining Path, a terrorist group, during the internal conflict in Peru.

== Massacre ==
On 6 August 1986, in the city of Aucayacu, capital of the José Crespo Y Castillo District, members of Shining Path killed 10 people, including gay men and female prostitutes.

== Condemnation ==
The mass murders of homosexuals and sex workers during the conflict is considered one of the greatest acts of misogyny, homophobia, and violent actions against prostitution in the country. It is also classified as a sample of exacerbated masculinity and a legacy of internalized discrimination against sexual minorities in parts of the rural population.

== See also ==
- La Hoyada massacre
- Communism and LGBT rights
- Femicides in Peru
- Homophobia
- LGBT rights in Peru
- List of massacres in Peru
- Prostitution in Peru
- Socialism and LGBT rights
- Violence against LGBT people
