= La Hoyada massacre =

1988 massacre in Pucallpa, Peru

On September 12, 1988, Shining Path killed eight people in La Hoyoda, Pucallpa, Peru. The victims were accused of being homosexuals (cabros), sex workers (prostis) and drug users (fumos).

The massacre was one of four incidents of violence against LGBT people included in the final report of the Peruvian Truth and Reconciliation Commission.

== See also ==
- Transgender genocide
- Aucayacu massacre
- Tarapoto massacre
- LGBT rights in Peru
- Prostitution in Peru
- Socialism and LGBT rights
- Violence against LGBT people
