= Tarapoto massacre =

1989 massacre against LGBTQ people in Peru

Noche de las Gardenias
- Part of the internal conflict in Peru and violence against LGBTQ people
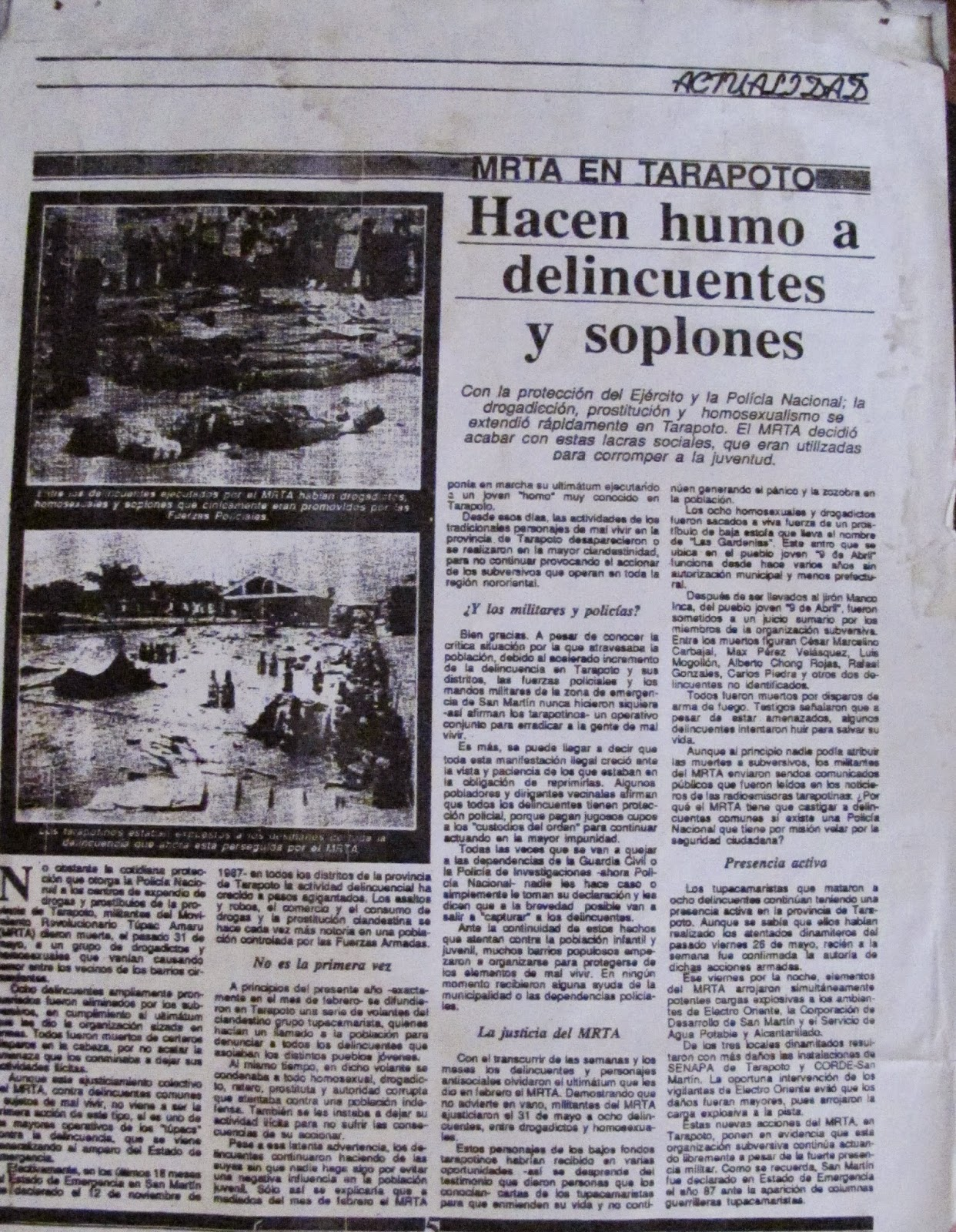
- Front cover of Cambio, MRTA's official propaganda newspaper, covering the news of the Tarapoto massacre. The headline translates to "They smoke out crooks and snitches".
- Location: Tarapoto, San Martín Department, Peru
- Date: 31 May 1989; 37 years ago
- Target: "Criminals" (per MRTA); LGBTQ civilians (de facto victims)
- Attack type: Massacre; Kidnapping; Extrajudicial killing Hate crime
- Deaths: 8 dead
- Perpetrators: MRTA (denied by MRTA); Peruvian nationalists (according by MRTA)
- Motive: Homophobia; Transphobia "Social cleansing" (per MRTA)
- Accused: Víctor Polay Campos of the MRTA, et al

The Tarapoto massacre, also known as the Night of the Gardenias (Spanish: Noche de las Gardenias), was a selective massacre against LGBT people that took place on May 31, 1989, during the period of terrorism in Peru. A total of eight people were killed, who were captured in the Las Gardenias discotheque in the Peruvian city of Tarapoto (San Martín). The attack was perpetrated by members of the subversive group Túpac Amaru Revolutionary Movement (MRTA) and took place as part of the “crusades against vice”, campaigns of “social cleansing” that the group carried out in the Northeastern Front.

The attack was the largest hate crime against transgender people in the history of Peru. and the largest kidnapping of non-heterosexual people until the one carried out in December of the same year in Picuruyacu (Huánuco) by another subversive group operating in Peru, Shining Path, against twelve young transgender people. One of the consequences of the massacre was the increase in internally displaced persons and LGBT migration as they fled the conflict to areas controlled by the weak first Aprista government of Alan García, while those who did not leave the city opted for pairing up with heterosexual women to demonstrate their “dehomosexualization” and not be murdered.

After the massacre, the harassment and persecution in Tarapoto, as well as throughout the Peruvian Amazon, of people because of their sexual orientation and gender identity, continued into the 21st century until the defeat of the subversive groups by the Peruvian Armed Forces in 2014. During the judicial proceedings against the accused, the leadership of the MRTA never acknowledged their formal responsibility for the massacre. Several organizations agreed to institutionalize May 31 as the “National Day to Combat Violence and Hate Crimes against Lesbians, Trans, Gays and Bisexuals“, commemorating it for the first time in 2004.

== Massacre ==
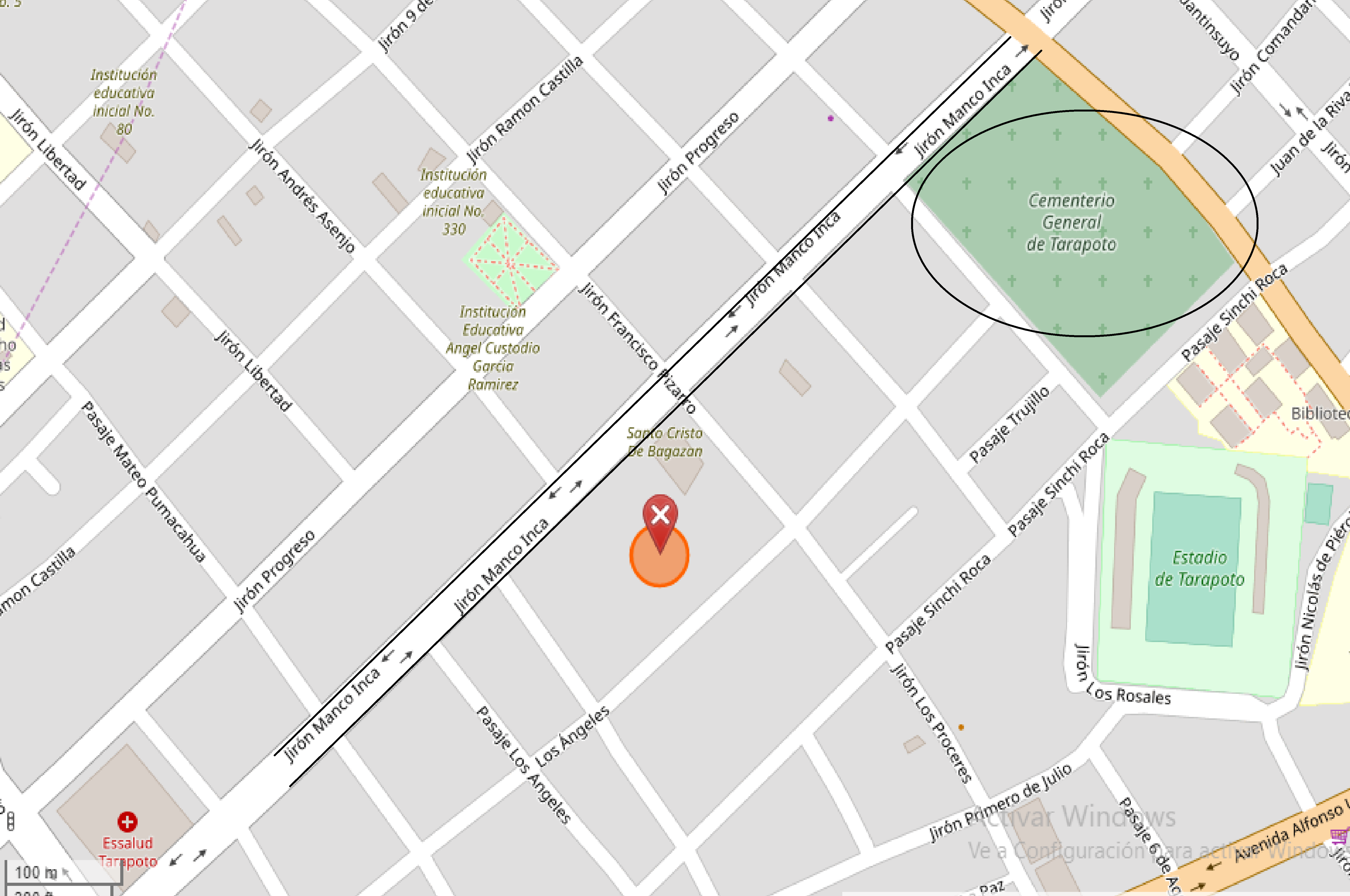
Map showing location of Las Gardenias, site of the massacre

In the early morning of May 31, 1989, six members of the MRTA entered the discotheque Las Gardenias in the human settlement “9 de abril” because they had heard rumors that the place was operating as a clandestine gay bar. Indeed, there were homosexuals and transsexuals in the place, the subversives seized eight of the people present at random and took them to the outskirts of the bar to shoot them in front of the population. The following day, in its weekly Cambio, the terrorist group justified its actions by asserting that the murdered people were delinquents and collaborators with the Peruvian army.

== Impact ==
MRTA continued to attack LGBTQ civilians until its defeat, as was the case with the murder of three transvestites between May and June 1990. The Truth and Reconciliation Commission (CVR) described the massacre as an act of homophobia; the memory of the victims and the account of the events is part of the permanent exhibition at the Place of Memory, Tolerance and Social Inclusion. In 2004, in commemoration of the massacre, 31 May was declared ‘National Day for the Fight against Violence and Hate Crimes against Lesbians, Trans, Gays and Bisexuals’ and for the Peruvian LGBT community it is the second most important day after the International LGBT Pride Day, which is celebrated every 28 June.

== See also ==
- Aucayacu massacre
- La Hoyada massacre
- LGBT rights in Peru
- Socialism and LGBT rights
- Violence against LGBT people
- Transgender genocide
