= 2019 El Agustino murder =

Massacres in Peru

- Location: El Agustino, Peru
- Date: December 22, 2019
- Attack type: Femicide, mass murder, stabbing, Mass stabbing, Arson
- Weapons: Kitchen knife; Fire
- Deaths: 4
- Injuries: 1
- Perpetrator: Juan Huaripata Rosales

2019 El Agustino murder was a mass killing that occurred in the El Agustino district of Lima, the capital of Peru. It took place on December 22, 2019, when Juan Huaripata Rosales murdered his partner and their three children, and wounded a fourth child who survived.

The massacre sparked controversy regarding the actions of some ministries in the government of President Martín Vizcarra. Given that the event unfolded during a critical period of high femicide rate and crime in the country, the murderer was able to initially kill his partner and the local police did not act in time.

== Murders ==
The massacre took place in the early morning of December 22, in a house on Jirón La Mar, in the district of El Agustino. The killer was arguing with Tejeda over marital issues when he grabbed a kitchen knife and tried to harm his wife. His eldest son tried to stop the attack and received a fatal wound. The other nine son, who was present, was also injured. He then returned to his main target and ended his wife's life. To try to cover up the double murder, Huaripata caused a The fire, set to destroy evidence and the bodies, also caused severe burns to the other children in the house, which later led to their deaths.

== Investigations ==
The massacre was carried out by Juan Huaripata Rosales (28) against his family, Jesica Tejeda Huayanay (34) and three of her four sons. According to the Peruvian National Police, the mass murder was planned in advance by Huaripata and was not an isolated incident as initially thought. Two of the boys (one 14 and the other 9) were from another relationship of Tejeda's, while two more, a boy and a girl (2 years and 2 months old), were the children of the deceased and her killer.

The psychological evaluation revealed the following conversation with Huaripata, The National Police reported that the killer used gloves to carry out the massacre, reinforcing the theory that the killing had been premeditated. Anticipation.

Agustina Huayanay, mother of Jesica and grandmother of the victims, declared that there is no sufficient sentence for the person responsible for the death of almost her entire family:

“I want that bastard to get three life sentences, because he did that. What did they do to deserve it? My child was innocent of anything.”

Three days later, on December 25, Jessica Tejeda's three-month-old daughter was buried in the Presbítero Matías Maestro Cemetery. While the bodies of Tejeda and her 15-year-old son were buried in the El Ángel Cemetery, her two-year-old daughter, who died a day after the attack, was buried the following day in that same cemetery.

== Aftermath ==
Public opinion and Tejeda's family harshly criticized the lack of action by the Minister of Women Gloria Montenegro and the Minister of the Interior Carlos Morán to prevent this type of massacre. The Peruvian National Police were themselves labeled "indifferent," as some claimed that officers at a nearby police station heard the cries for help from the victims and neighbors during the massacre and fire.

In an interview on December 25, 2019, the Minister of Justice and Human Rights (Peru), Ana Teresa Revilla, was asked about the massacre, to which she replied, "I am in the midst of it." "At Christmas," This phrase was heavily criticized, even by President Martín Vizcarra. Subsequently, on December 31, Revilla apologized for her statements, for "not having been prepared," and reported that she does not intend to resign from her leadership position. Ministry.

== Investigation ==
On December 31, 2019, the Public Prosecutor's Office (Peru) opened an investigation into four police officers from the nearby station for dereliction of duty, for failing to assist the victims. time.

Finally, after almost three years, on August 22, 2022, the murderer was sentenced to life imprisonment for the murders.

== See also ==
- 2017 Lima shooting
- Ricardo Palma Clinic bombing
