= Ubalda García de Cañete =

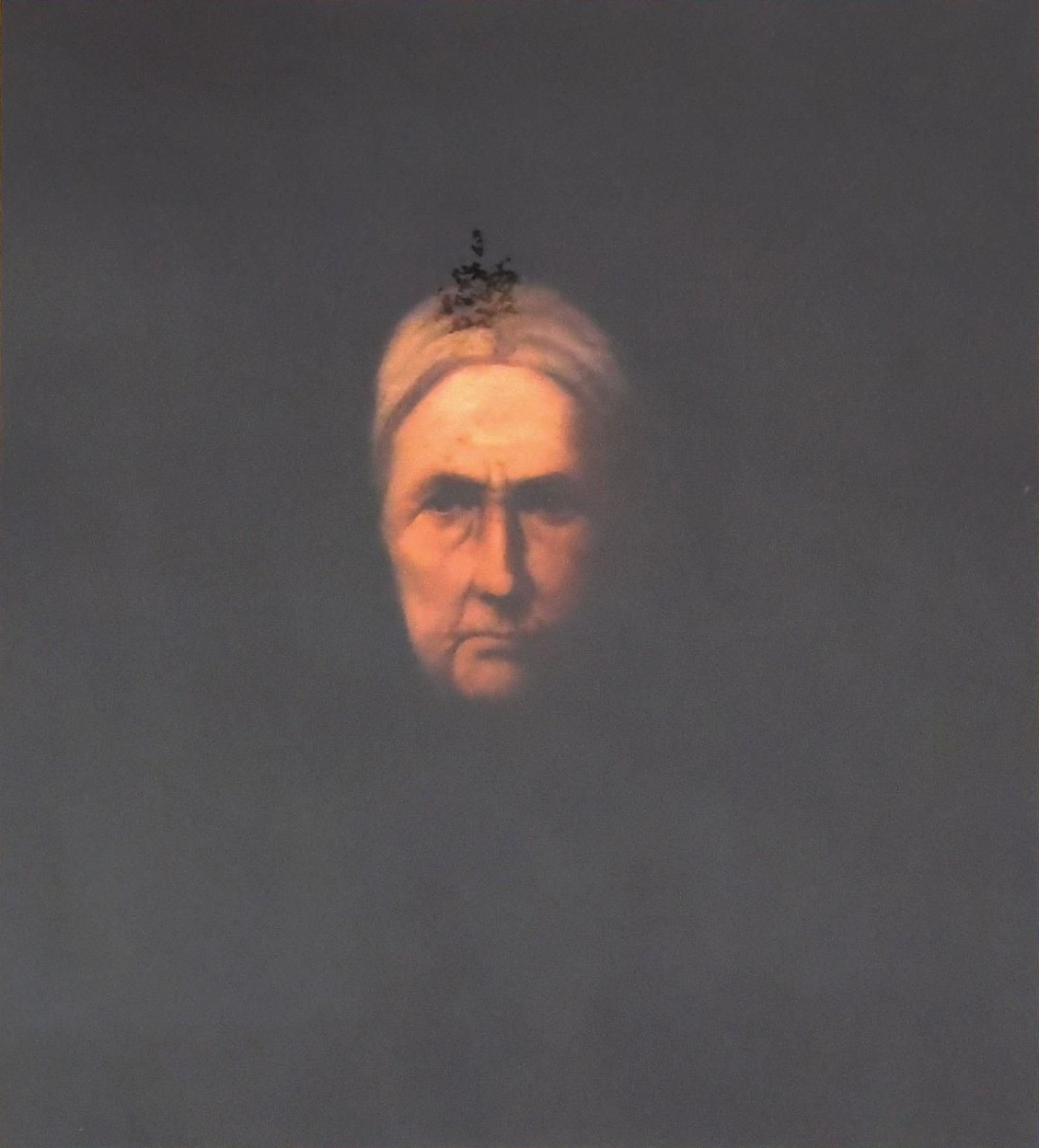
A painting of Ubalda

Ubalda García de Cañete (1807–1890) was the eldest daughter of the Paraguayan leader José Gaspar Rodríguez de Francia.

== Life ==
Ubalda's mother was María Juana García, a mistress of Francia. Although his daughter was illegitimate, and he was not known for any acts of kindness, Francia nonetheless respected his daughter. One day he found her prostituting herself near his residence, and rather than punishing her, he declared prostitution a decent profession (he himself used prostitutes). He also ordered that prostitutes had to wear golden combs in their hair, in the style of Spanish ladies.

Ubalda later married Juan de la Cruz Cañete. She gave birth to a daughter, Francisca del Rosario, in 1842, two years after Francia's death. Francisca del Rosario in turn married Sgt. Manuel Epifanio Peña thus creating a long dynasty of Paraguayan statesmen, politicians, and intellectuals, such as Manuel Jaime Peña, José Segundo Decoud, Pedro Pablo Peña, Manuel Peña Villamil, Silvana López Moreira, Agustín Cañete and Santiago Peña. Ubalda died in Asunción in 1890, at the age of 83 and is buried in the Recoleta Cemetery in Asuncion.
