= The Ballad of Reading Gaol =

1897 poem by Oscar Wilde

The Ballad of Reading Gaol (1904)

"The Ballad of Reading Gaol" is a poem by Oscar Wilde, written in exile in Berneval-le-Grand and Naples, after his release from HM Prison Reading (Reading Gaol, RED-ing jail) on 19 May 1897. Wilde had been incarcerated in Reading after being convicted of gross indecency with other men in 1895 and sentenced to two years' hard labour in prison.

During his imprisonment, on Tuesday, 7 July 1896, a hanging took place. Charles Thomas Wooldridge had been a trooper in the Royal Horse Guards. He was convicted of cutting the throat of his wife, Laura Ellen, earlier that year at Clewer, near Windsor. He was aged 30 when executed.

Wilde wrote the poem in 1897, beginning it in Berneval-le-Grand and completing it in Naples. The poem narrates the execution of Wooldridge; it moves from an objective story-telling to symbolic identification with the prisoners as a whole. No attempt is made to assess the justice of the laws which convicted them, but rather the poem highlights the brutalisation of the punishment that all convicts share. Wilde juxtaposes the executed man and himself with the line "Yet each man kills the thing he loves". Wilde too was separated from his wife and sons. He adopted the proletarian ballad form, and suggested it be published in Reynold's Magazine, "because it circulates widely among the criminal classes – to which I now belong – for once I will be read by my peers – a new experience for me".

The finished poem was published by Leonard Smithers on 13 February 1898 under the name "C.3.3.", which stood for cell block C, landing 3, cell 3. This ensured that Wilde's name – by then notorious – did not appear on the poem's front cover. It was not commonly known, until the 7th printing in June 1899, that C.3.3. was actually Wilde. The first edition, of 800 copies, sold out within a week, and Smithers announced that a second edition would be ready within another week; that was printed on 24 February, in 1,000 copies, which also sold well. A third edition, of 99 numbered copies "signed by the author", was printed on 4 March, on the same day a fourth edition of 1,200 ordinary copies was printed. A fifth edition of 1,000 copies was printed on 17 March, and a sixth edition was printed in 1,000 copies on 21 May 1898. So far the book's title page had identified the author only as C.3.3., although many reviewers, and of course those who bought the numbered and autographed third edition copies, knew that Wilde was the author, but the seventh edition, printed on 23 June 1899, actually revealed the author's identity, putting the name Oscar Wilde, in square brackets, below the C.3.3. The poem brought him a small income for the rest of his life.

The poem consists of 109 sestets or six-line stanzas, a variation of the traditional ballad quatrain. The lines are formed of iambic tetrameters and trimeters of 8-6-8-6-8-6 syllables. The rhyme scheme is: ABCBDB. Some stanzas incorporate rhymes within some or all of the 8-syllable lines. The whole poem is grouped into 6 untitled sections of 16, 13, 37, 23, 17 and 3 stanzas. A version with only 63 of the stanzas, divided into 4 sections of 15, 7, 22 and 19 stanzas, and allegedly based on the original draft, was included in the posthumous editions of Wilde's poetry edited by Robert Ross, "for the benefit of reciters and their audiences who have found the entire poem too long for declamation".

== History of the poem ==
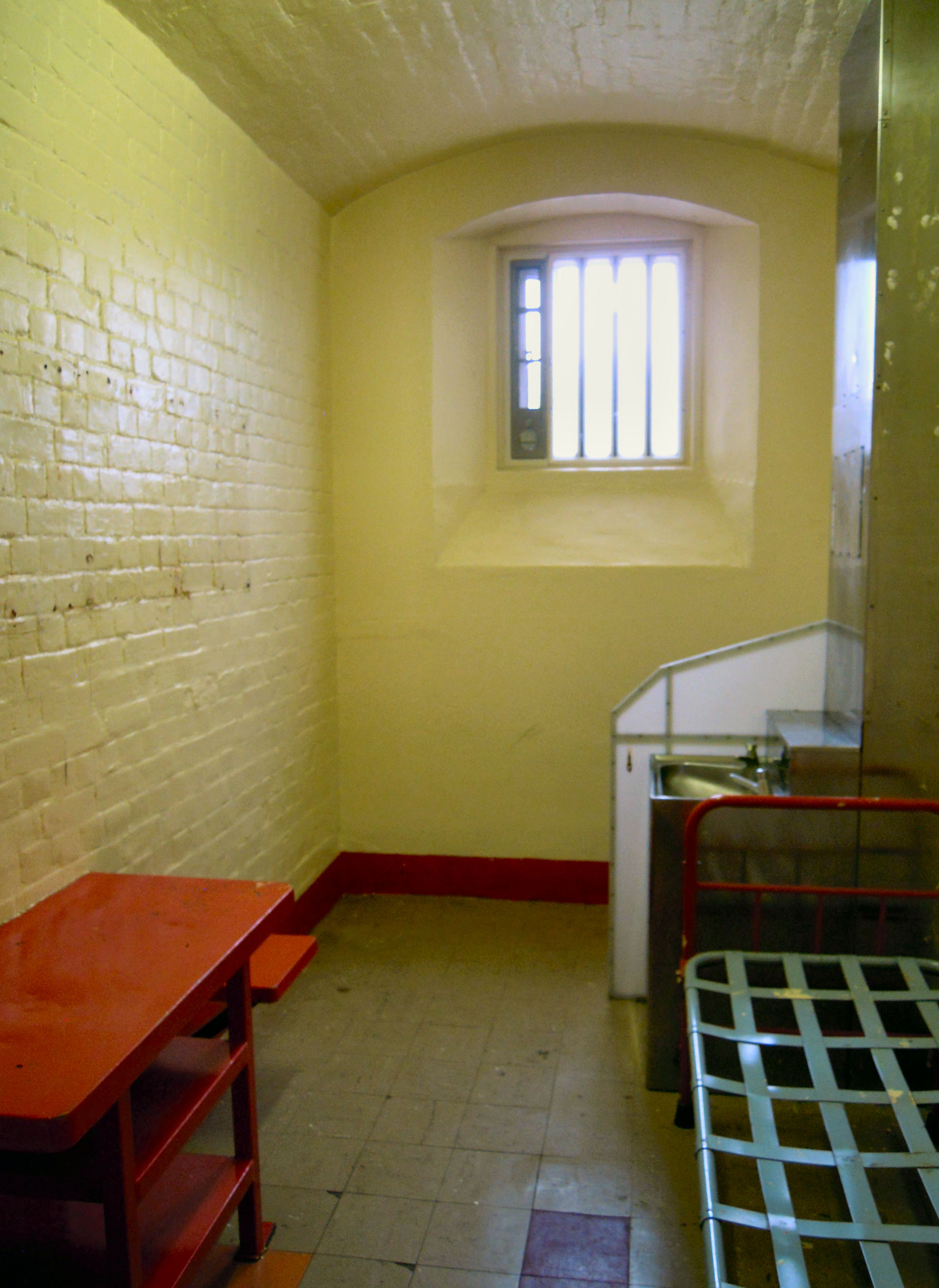
Wilde's cell in Reading Gaol as it appears today

On 25 May 1895, Wilde was convicted and sentenced to two years' hard labour—a punishment that was considered more severe than mere penal servitude. He was first sent, briefly, to Newgate Prison for initial processing, and the next week was moved to Pentonville prison, where "hard labour" consisted of many hours of pointless effort in walking a treadmill or picking oakum (separating the fibres in scraps of old navy ropes), and allowed to read only the Bible and The Pilgrim's Progress. Prisoners were not allowed to speak to each other, and, out of their solitary cells, were required to wear a cap with a sort of thick veil so they would not be recognised by other prisoners. A few months later he was moved to Wandsworth Prison, which had a similar regimen. While he was there, he was required to declare bankruptcy, by which he lost virtually all his possessions including his books and manuscripts. On 23 November 1895 he was again moved, to the prison at Reading, which also had similar rules, where he spent the remainder of his sentence, and was assigned the third cell on the third floor of C ward—and thereafter addressed and identified only as "C.3.3."—prisoners were identified only by their cell numbers and not by name.

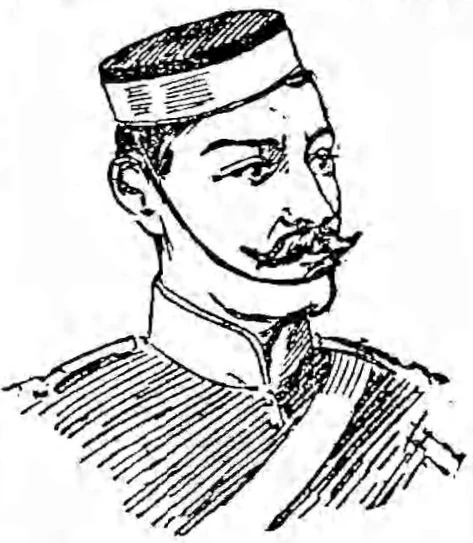
Wooldridge, in an 1896 illustration

About five months after Wilde arrived at Reading Gaol, Charles Thomas Wooldridge, a trooper in the Royal Horse Guards, was brought to Reading to await his trial for murdering his common-law wife (and promptly presenting himself and confessing to a policeman) on 29 March 1896. On 17 June, Wooldridge was sentenced to death and returned to Reading for his execution which took place on 7 July 1896—the first hanging at Reading in 18 years. Though Wilde observed Wooldridge in the prison yard only from a distance, he dedicated The Ballad of Reading Gaol to Wooldridge as C. T. W.

Wilde was released from prison on 18 May 1897, and promptly went to France, never returning to Britain. He died in Paris, at the age of 46, on 30 November 1900.

While in France, surviving on an allowance from his wife of three pounds a week—deliberately meagre to discourage the sort of high living that had led to his 'downfall'—Wilde endeavoured to find additional money. In August 1897, he sent the publisher Leonard Smithers an initial draft of the Ballad, which made such an impression that Smithers was enthusiastic about publishing it and even approached Aubrey Beardsley to do an illustration for it (which was not done). Thereafter there was a very active correspondence between the two of them, as Wilde was repeatedly revising and expanding the text, and supervising from afar the choice and size of typeface and the layout of the work. However, even the printing house hired to do the book demanded a change—for fear that the prison doctor would sue over the line which originally read "While the coarse-mouthed doctor gloats", it was changed to "While some coarse-mouthed doctor gloats". As one biographer, Leonard Cresswell Ingleby, said, "Never, perhaps, since Gray's Elegy had a poem been so revised, pruned, and polished over and over again as this cry from a prison cell". Originally the first edition—with no assurance of a second edition—was planned for only 400 copies, but when Wilde calculated the printing expenses, he realised that even selling all 400 would not cover costs, and at his instigation Smithers instructed the printing house to double the number of copies and keep the printing plates in hopes of a reprinting. As publication day approached, Wilde was occasionally seized by a sort of panic over his finances and the risks of the poem failing to sell well, and made some half-hearted efforts to sell the poem's copyright for immediate cash; there were only a few disappointing nibbles and no such sale was made. However, the poem sold very well and very quickly, and caused such a stir that subsequent printings also sold well for more than a year, assuring Wilde of a steady income which he did not outlive, as he died less than three years after the Ballad first appeared.

It has been suggested that Wilde was, to some degree, inspired by poem IX in A. E. Housman's A Shropshire Lad (1896), which alludes to the hanging of condemned prisoners:

They hang us now in Shrewsbury jail:
The whistles blow forlorn,
And trains all night groan on the rail
To men that die at dawn.

Although there is no specific documentation to show Wilde's active revising after the appearance of the first edition, there were some slight changes made in the second edition, which was printed only two weeks after the first edition went on sale. For example, in the first edition a line read "And his step was light", and in the second edition it becomes "And his step seemed light". These tiny alterations persisted through the seventh edition, the last edition handled by Smithers, and thereafter to most of the reprints. Since Smithers had the printers retain the plates from the first edition, it seems plausible that these were deliberate revisions done at Wilde's request.

Wilde did acknowledge (evidently to several people, since numerous separate sources recalled this) a glaring error in the very first line of the poem, "He did not wear his scarlet coat"—because Wooldridge, as a member of the Royal Horse Guards, had a blue uniform—but justified this poetic licence because the second line would make no sense if it said "For blood and wine are blue".

The poem has been translated into countless languages, including French (1898) by Henry Durand-Davray, Spanish (1898), German (1900), Russian (1904), and many others. The 1902 German translation by Emma Clausen is the earliest translation of the poem in any language done by a woman writer.

== Notable excerpts ==
Several passages from the poem have become famous:

Yet each man kills the thing he loves
By each let this be heard.
Some do it with a bitter look,
Some with a flattering word.
The coward does it with a kiss,
The brave man with a sword!

The line is a nod to Shakespeare's The Merchant of Venice, when Bassanio asks "Do all men kill the things they do not love?"

A passage from the poem was chosen as the epitaph on Wilde's tomb;

And alien tears will fill for him,
Pity's long-broken urn,
For his mourners will be outcast men,
And outcasts always mourn.

== References in other media ==
- W. E. B. Du Bois quotes from the eleventh stanza of part IV of the poem at the end of chapter 17 of Black Reconstruction in America, 1860–1880:
  For he has a pall, this wretched man,
  Such as few men can claim;
  Deep down below a prison-yard,
  Naked, for greater shame,
  He lies, with fetters on each foot,
  Wrapt in a sheet of flame!
- During the climax of D. W. Griffith's Intolerance, as The Boy is being led toward the gallows, one of the title-cards quotes the following excerpt:
  So with curious eyes and sick surmise
  We watched him day by day,
  And wondered if each one of us
  Would end the self-same way,
  For none can tell to what red Hell
  His sightless soul may stray.
- In a 1962 episode of The Virginian titled "The Brazen Bell", a timid schoolteacher (George C. Scott) recites The Ballad of Reading Gaol to distract a convicted wife-killer who is holding him and a group of schoolchildren hostage (the series was set in approximately the same year as the first publication of the poem).
- In Vladimir Mayakovsky's long poem About This (Russian: Про это), there is a section titled "The Ballad of Reading Gaol" ("Баллада Редингской тюрьмы").
- In A Clockwork Orange by Anthony Burgess, while discussing the experimental aversion therapy administered to the narrator Alex, Dr. Branom says, "Each man kills the thing he loves, as the poet-prisoner said".
- The Ballad of Reading Gaol is also referenced and quoted in Eugene O'Neill's Ah, Wilderness!, and referenced in Act IV of Long Day's Journey into Night.
- The line "Each man kills the thing he loves" appears in two films concerned with ideas of criminality: Mad Love and Querelle.
- Robert Mitchum misquotes the poem to Janet Leigh in the 1949 film Holiday Affair – "There's a poem that runs roughly, 'Each man kicks the thing he loves.'"
- The Ballad of Reading Gaol is quoted at the end of chapter 16 of Upton Sinclair's The Jungle, attributing it to "a poet, to whom the world had dealt its justice".
- An excerpt of the poem is quoted in the 2018 film The Happy Prince.
- Sylvester Stallone's character (a former inmate) quotes lines from the poem and explains their meaning in the 2024 second-season episode of Tulsa King titled "Back in the Saddle".

== Audio productions ==
- There have been a number of readings of the poem on BBC Radio, with readers including Ralph Richardson in 1963, Samuel West in 2005. and Alex Jennings in 2012.
- A live performance of the poem was broadcast from the Lyric Theatre in Hammersmith, London on BBC Radio 3 on 9 October 1995. The readers included Ian McKellen, Stephen Fry, Neil Tennant and Bette Bourne.
- Audiobook recordings include readings by Donald Sinden, Simon Callow., B. J. Harrison, David Moore, Roy Macready and Arthur English.

== Music ==
Jacques Ibert's first symphonic work, La ballade de la geôle de Reading (The Ballad of Reading Gaol), was composed in 1920.

== See also ==
- Music based on the works of Oscar Wilde
- Reading, Berkshire
