= Putis massacre =

Coordinates: 12°34′44″S 74°13′44″W

- Part of Internal conflict in Peru
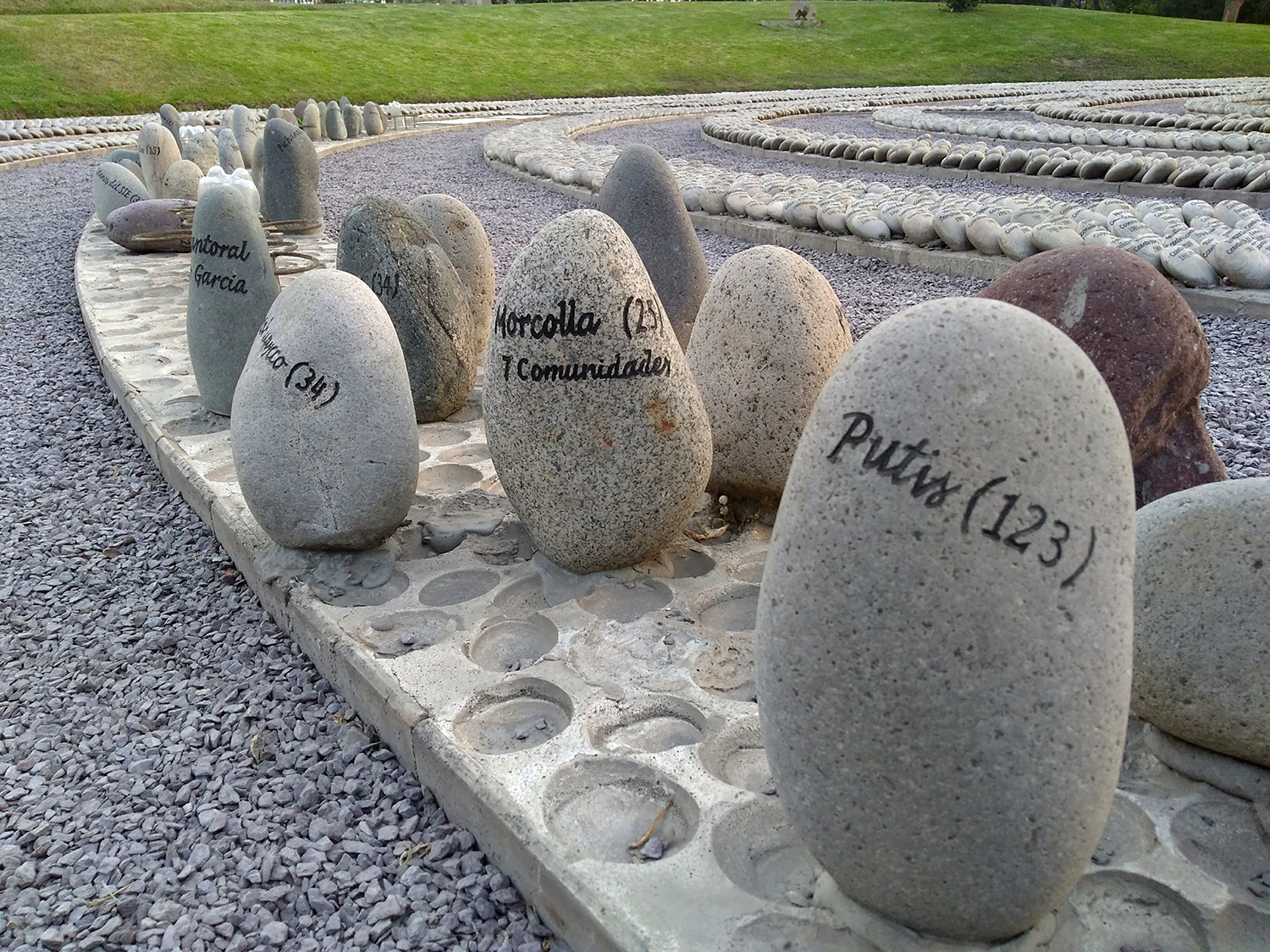
- "Putis (123)" detail at The Eye that Cries memorial in Lima
- Location: Putis, Peru
- Date: December 1984
- Target: Peasants
- Attack type: Massacre
- Deaths: 123
- Perpetrator: Peruvian Army

The Putis Massacre was a massacre of 123 campesinos carried out by the Peruvian Army in a rural hamlet in the Santillana District of the Huanta Province in the Ayacucho Region of Peru. The massacre occurred in December 1984.

== Background ==
According to a 2003 report by the Peruvian Truth and Reconciliation Commission, the guerrilla group Shining Path was very active in the Huanta Province since the start of the Internal conflict in Peru in 1980. During 1983, Shining Path murdered the lieutenant governor of Putis, Santos Quispe Saavedra, and carried out similar acts of violence in nearby towns; as a consequence, the inhabitants of Putis were forced to seek refuge in the nearby mountains.

To parry this threat, the Peruvian Army established a military base in Putis in November 1984 and called on all refugees to return to the town.

== Massacre ==
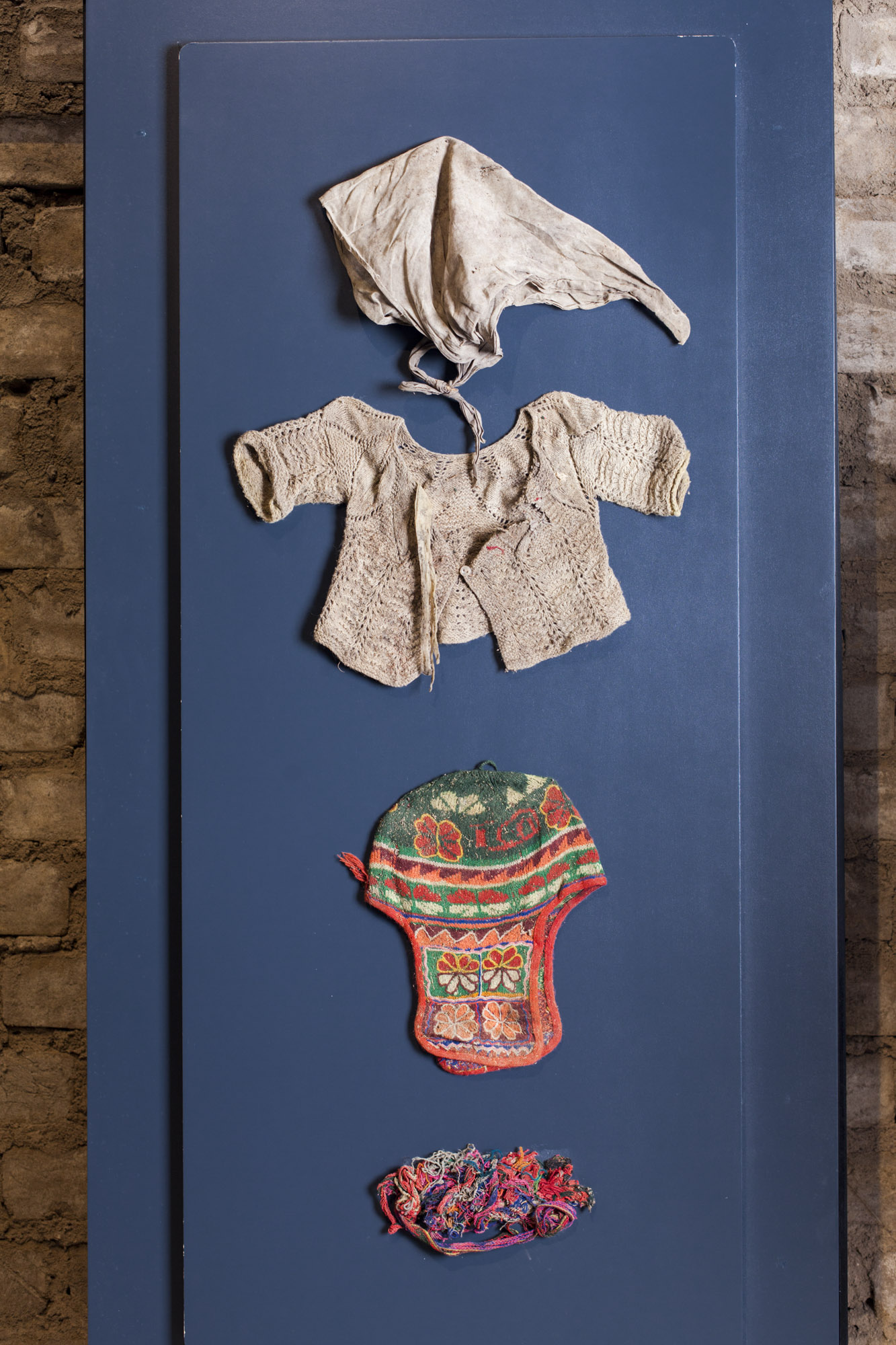
Exhumed clothes of children murdered by soldiers in December 1984 and then buried in Putis

By December 1984, most of the population had returned to the Putis settlement. The military ordered the men of the community to dig a pit, then gathered the local population around it, executed all of them with gunfire and buried them in the excavated pit. It is believed that the reasons for these executions were suspicions that the inhabitants of Putis were sympathetic to Shining Path and a desire to steal and sell the cattle of the community.

The total number of victims is estimated at 123 men and women from the settlements of Cayramayo, Vizcatánpata, Orccohuasi and Putis; 19 of those murdered were minors. The Truth and Reconciliation Commission identified two mass graves in Putis, one behind the church and the other inside the school. Some persons from Putis survived the massacre by staying in the mountains, where they remained until a few of them returned in 1997; as of 2002 some ten families lived in Putis.

== Investigation ==
In May 2008, a group of forensic investigators began the exhumation of the Putis mass graves belatedly following a 2003 recommendation by the Truth and Reconciliation Commission to investigate all such massacre sites. Around 50 relatives of the persons killed joined the investigators to watch the recovery of their family members remains. Despite the exhumation procedures, no one has been indicted so far for the Putis massacre as the Peruvian Military refuses to give any explanation about the events, claiming all related documentation was destroyed in a fire.

In August 2009, a mass funeral was held for ninety-two victims of the 1984 massacre. The remains of only twenty-eight were identified through the use of DNA and many of the coffins contained only partial remains.

== See also ==
- List of massacres in Peru
