= Santa massacre =

1992 killing of peasants in Peru

- Location: Santa Province, Peru
- Date: 2 May 1992
- Attack type: Massacre, false flag operation
- Deaths: 9
- Victim: Civilians
- Perpetrator: Grupo Colina
- Motive: Anti-communism

The Santa Massacre was a massacre of nine male campesinos carried out by Grupo Colina in the Santa Province of the Ancash Region of Peru. The massacre occurred on May 2, 1992.

After carrying out the massacre, members of Grupo Colina, a death squad operating out of the Army of Peru, painted pro-Shining Path graffiti as a false flag operation. All of the members of Grupo Colina have since been jailed.

The victims of the massacre were finally exhumed and identified in August 2011 and reburied in late November of the same year with the Peruvian government formally apologizing to the relatives of the victims in name of the state.

== Preparations ==
Between 1990 and 1992, the Santa Province was considered a strategic area, with both the Shining Path and the MRTA vying for hegemony there. The area had been declared a red zone.

On April 30, 1992, Major Santiago Martín Rivas summoned the heads of the operational subgroups of the Colina Detachment, at the "request of the general commander [Nicolás de Bari Hermoza Ríos]," to a meeting at the apartment of the Fung brothers, owners of the San Dionisio Mill in Miraflores. One of the Fungs, Jorge, was a friend of Juan Bosco Hermoza Ríos, Nicolás's brother.

At the meeting, the Fungs indicated that they had information on the Shining Path members operating in the Santa area, especially those who participated in the March 29, 1992, attack, where 30 hikers placed explosives in the administrative offices of the San Dionisio Mill, burned machines and 50 bales of ginned cotton; Furthermore, as a result of this attack, a fire broke out that destroyed the mill. At the meeting, it was arranged that two collaborators would meet with the members of the Colina Detachment in Casma to identify those involved in the act. After the meeting, Agent Sosa Saavedra commented that the operation was "a private job because Mr. Fung was a friend of the Commanding General."

On May 1, 18 members of the Colina Group left Lima for Santa aboard several vehicles, carrying long and short-range firearms. At the same time, on May 1, a group of Shining Path members raided Coishco, Santa, blocking the Pan-American Highway North, destroying a vehicle from the Carolina company and taking over the tunnel where they painted. After the raid, the hikers, after leaving several marines wounded, fled to the top of the Coishco hills while another group fled through La Huaca.

== Event ==
At 8:00 p.m., members of the Colina Group arrived in Casma. The vehicles were parked near the Plaza de Armas. Martín Rivas, along with Carlos Pichilingüe, met with the two collaborators at a bar where they drank beer. After 10:00 p.m., they reappeared with the collaborators, got into the vehicles, and Martín Rivas ordered them to move forward. Before reaching the Javier Heraud neighborhood, the groups were divided up.

In the early morning of May 2, 1992, Colina members, dressed in military uniforms and wearing balaclavas (except for one whose face was uncovered), entered the villages of La Huaca, Javier Heraud, and San Carlos, located in Santa, and forced nine peasants linked to labor and trade union movements into their trucks. The victims were not Fung workers. The collection of the victims lasted nearly two hours, and the victims were selected based on information provided by informants gathered in Casma. After completing the collection, the paramilitaries painted pro-Senderista graffiti, as part of a false flag operation.

After collecting the victims, they headed to the Chao Valley. At that location, they stopped and got out of the vehicles. The victims were divided into two groups, moving in opposite directions, while a member of the Colina Group followed each group. The informants, for their part, remained in the vehicles. The victims were shot with a silencer. The bodies were dumped in three mass graves located in Huaca Corral (La Libertad), at km 468 of the Panamericana Norte.

== Aftermath ==
The victims were exhumed and identified in August 2011 and reburied on November 13 of the same year. The Peruvian government issued a formal apology to the victims' families on behalf of the state.

According to subsequent investigations, the massacre was allegedly instigated by private interests through General Nicolás Hermoza. The sentence that convicted three members of the Colina Group for the massacre highlighted that the victims were not related to the Shining Path.

== Victims ==
The murdered campesinos were:

- Carlos Alberto Barrientos Velásquez
- Roberto Barrientos Velásquez
- Denis Atilio Castillo Chávez
- Federico Coquis Velásquez
- Gilmer Ramiro León Velásquez
- Pedro Pablo López González
- Jesús Manfredo Noriega Ríos
- Carlos Martín Tarazona More
- Jorge Luis Tarazona More

== See also ==
- List of massacres in Peru
