= Emma Clausen =

German-American poet, translator, and anarchist

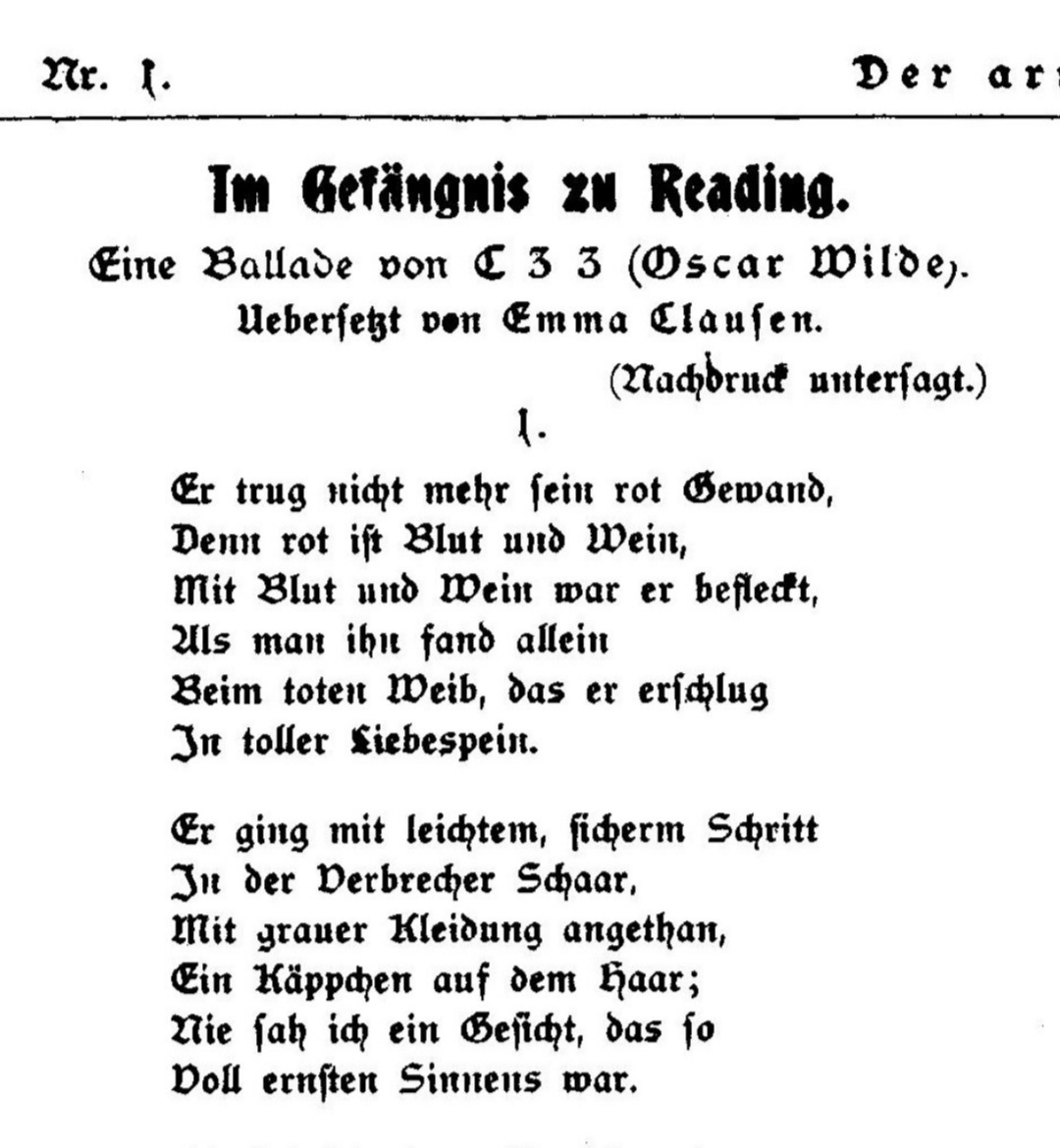
- Translation of The Ballad of Reading Gaol

Emma Clausen was a poet, translator of poetry, physician, and anarchist. She was born in 1867 in Germany, and immigrated to Canada and the United States. She was part of the anarchist circle in Detroit, Michigan, which included figures like Robert Reitzel.

Her translation of The Ballad of Reading Gaol by Oscar Wilde into German as Im Gefängnis zu Reading: Eine Ballade von C 3 3 was published in 1902 in the journal Der arme Teufel. She is the first woman translator of The Ballad of Reading Gaol in any language.

In 1906, she published a poem in Mother Earth (magazine). Her book of poetry Im Vorübergehn: Gedichte was published in 1956.

== Publications ==
- Im Vorübergehn. The Commonwealth Press, Los Angeles, California 1956.
- Kleinigkeiten. 1958.
