= Cañete =

Cañete may refer to:

== Places ==
- Cañete, Chile, a city in Chile
- San Vicente de Cañete, a town in Peru
- San Vicente de Cañete District, Peru
- Cañete Province, Peru
- Cañete River, in Cañete Province, Peru
- Cañete, Cuenca, a municipality in Cuenca, Spain
  - Castle of Cañete, a castle in Cañete, Spain
- Cañete de las Torres, a municipality in Cordoba, Spain
- Cañete la Real, a municipality in Málaga, Spain

== People with the surname ==
- Agustín Cañete (1844-1902), Paraguayan politician
- Cha-Cha Cañete (born 2004), Filipino actress
- Miguel Arias Cañete (born 1950), Spanish politician
- Manuel Cañete (1822–1891), Spanish writer
- Marcelo Cañete (born 1990), Argentinian footballer
