= Agustín Cañete =

Paraguayan politician

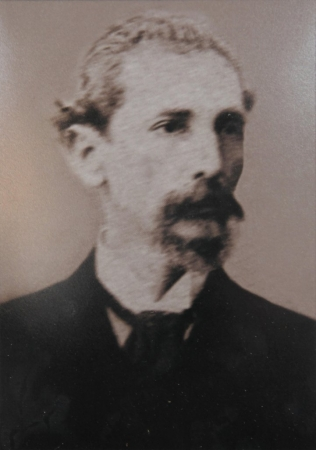

Minister of Justice, Religion and Public Education of Paraguay
- In office 12 August 1878 – 25 November 1878
- Preceded by: Adolfo Saguier
- Succeeded by: José Segundo Decoud

Minister of Finance of Paraguay
- In office 2 January 1885 – 29 December 1887
- Preceded by: Juan de la Cruz Giménez
- Succeeded by: Higinio Uriarte
- In office 9 June 1894 – 4 June 1895
- Preceded by: Otoniel Peña
- Succeeded by: Benjamín Aceval
- In office 24 February 1897 – 6 April 1898
- Preceded by: Emilio Aceval
- Succeeded by: Guillermo de los Ríos

Senator of Paraguay
- In office 28 September 1899 – 1902

Minister of the Paraguayan Supreme Court of Justice
- In office 1876 – 12 October 1877

President of the Paraguayan Supreme Court of Justice
- In office 28 November 1878 – 1882
- Preceded by: José de Leon
- In office 30 November 1882 – 24 September 1883
- Succeeded by: Benjamin Aceval
- In office 5 October 1883 – 10 October 1883
- Preceded by: Benjamin Aceval
- Succeeded by: José del Rosario Miranda

National Deputy of Paraguay
- In office 20 March 1877 – 10 April 1878
- Constituency: Trinidad

Personal details
- Born: 31 December 1844 Asunción, Paraguay
- Died: 23 December 1902 (aged 57) Asunción, Paraguay
- Resting place: La Recoleta Cemetery, Asunción
- Spouse: Natividad Sanchez
- Parents: Juan de la Cruz Cañete; Ubalda García de Cañete

Agustín Cañete García (31 December 1844 – 23 December 1902) was a Paraguayan politician. He fought in the Paraguayan War, and, after the conflict, served in various presidential cabinets through a political life which spanned more than three decades. Most famously, he was Minister of Finance of Paraguay three times; in two of these instances, he resigned from the position amidst accusations of corruption.

Also of note is his being a descendant of José Gaspar Rodríguez de Francia, who had been dictator of Paraguay between 1814 and 1840. Francia's legacy was controversial in the country, and this led to conflicts between those critical of him and Cañete, including an incident where the latter challenged the elderly Argentine former president Sarmiento to a duel after he'd lambasted Francia in the local newspapers.

== Biography ==
=== Early life ===
Cañete was born in 1844 to Juan de la Cruz Cañete, an officer in the army, and Ubalda García de Cañete, José Gaspar Rodríguez de Francia's illegitimate daughter. Francia was the dictator of Paraguay between 1814 and his death in 1840, and though his legacy was reviled in post-Triple Alliance War Paraguay, Cañete would through his life show some pride at being the dictator's grandson, coming so far as to challenging Argentine ex-president Domingo Sarmiento to a duel when the latter wrote a piece critical of Francia in Asunción in 1887.

During his youth, he was sent to the prestigious Argentinian Colegio del Uruguay to study. In the 1860s, he fought in the Triple Alliance War, being an ensign by the battle of Curupayty, and a sergeant major at the end of the conflict. During the key siege of Humaitá, he was colonel Martínez, the fortress's commander, 's aide. In the early years after the war, he joined the Decoudista Club del Pueblo party. He served as constitutionalist in the assembly which wrote the 1870 Constitution, and as congressman between the end of 1877 and 1878.

=== Work as minister ===
In 1878 he was briefly named minister of justice, religion and public Education in Higinio Uriarte's cabinet after Adolfo Saguier resigned, but a few months afterwards José Segundo Decoud was named minister in his stead when Candido Bareiro became president. Before this, he had been named president of Paraguay's Supreme Court, a position he would occupy again in the 1880s; he had already been a member of this court between 1876 and 1877.

From president Bareiro's assumption of power in 1878 onwards Cañete's political relevancy grew, given that Bareiro, future president Bernardino Caballero and Cañete were allies. In 1885 he became minister of finance, taking the position after Juan de la Cruz Gímenez resigned, formally for health reasons, amidst various accusations of corruption. The ministry was widely known to be in bad shape administratively when Cañete took over, and its reputation improved somewhat during his term. While minister, he was an important advocate for the process of land sales conducted by the government in the 1880s onwards, which are a controversial topic even nowadays, as they served to concentrate land ownership rapidly and had a somewhat short-lived impact in the country’s finances; in 1887 he also was interim minister of foreign affairs for some months, and was a founder of the long-standing Colorado Party. By 1888, he was widely accused by the country's media of embezzlement.

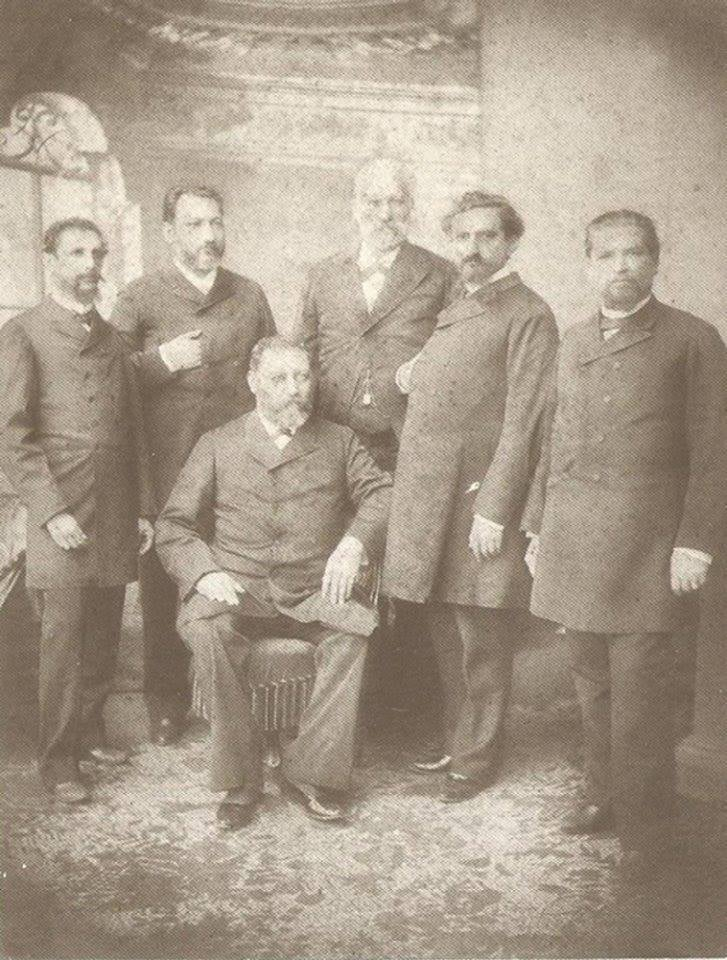
Bernardino Caballero's cabinet in 1886; Cañete is first from the left

Afterwards, in the 1890s, he twice again occupied the Ministry of Finance, the first time leaving after Cecilio Báez accused him of fraud in the process of closure of the Banco Nacional del Paraguay (of which he had been director). Nevertheless, he was still a strong figure amongst the Colorado Party, and in 1897 engaged in a power struggle with Segundo Decoud for the Paraguayan presidency, both of them belonging to Bernardino Caballero's wing of the Party - in the end, the Egusquicista Emilio Aceval was chosen to run, and thus elected; the choice of Aceval by the top echelons of the party made Cañete resign again from his post as minister.

=== Later years ===
In 1899 he became a senator of the republic. By this time he had also become an important investor in Paraguayan businesses, having large interests in enterprises such as the yerba mate giant La Industrial Paraguaya.

He died in Asunción in December 1902.

In 1909, Cañete was mentioned by name in José Segundo Decoud's suicide note, where he was called "López's secretary".
