= Ccano massacre =

1991 mass killing in Peru

- Part of Shining Path insurgency
- Location: Ccano, La Mar, Peru
- Date: February 23, 1991
- Target: Members of the Evangelical Pentecostal Church
- Deaths: 32
- Injuries: 7
- Perpetrator: Shining Path
- Motive: Communism; Maoism; people's war

The Ccano massacre was a mass attack on members of the Evangelical Pentecostal Church (see Pentecostal revival movement in Chile) perpetrated by members of the Shining Path in the village of Ccano in La Mar Province, Peru, killing 32 people. The attack was part of the then-ongoing main phase of the Shining Path insurgency.

On February 23, 1991, Maoist forces attacked various members of the church active in prayer, killing 32 people, and injuring 7 more. 4 of the attackers were killed by local civil defense forces before they entered the village. The church was targeted because some of its members had cooperated with Peruvian military forces to counter the Shining Path. It was recorded that 63 children had lost one or both of their parents in the attack.

Following an exhumation from a mass grave, the bodies of the victims were returned to the village in 2016.
