= Johannes Holzmann =

German anarchist writer and activist (1882–1914)

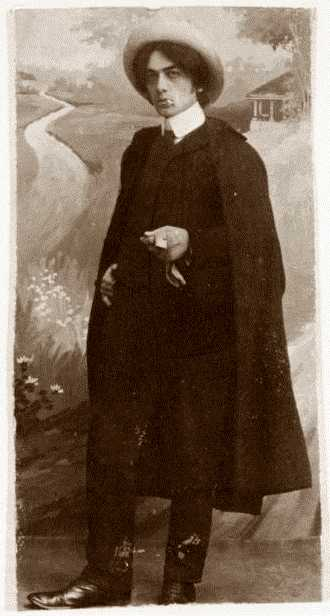
- Born: 30 October 1882; Tuchel, Prussia (now Tuchola, Poland)
- Died: 28 April 1914 (aged 31)
- Body discovered: Moscow, Russian Empire
- Resting place: Weißensee
- Other name: Senna Hoy
- Criminal penalty: Fifteen years of hard labor

Johannes Holzmann (30 October 1882 – 28 April 1914) was a German anarchist writer and activist who generally went by the pseudonym Senna Hoy.

== Early life and Berlin ==
Holzmann, born on 30 October 1882 in Tuchel, Prussia (now Tuchola, Poland), hailed from a bourgeois Jewish family. Moving to Berlin, he became a teacher of religion at first. Like many intellectuals around the turn of the century, he felt oppressed by the restrictive morals then reigning German society. He quit teaching in 1902 and founded the League for Human Rights (Bund für Menschenrecht, in German) in 1903.

He decided to devote himself entirely to writing and political activism from an anarchist standpoint. In 1904, he published a booklet entitled "Das dritte Geschlecht" ("The Third Gender"). In it, he attacked homophobia, laying most of the blame on religion. Above all, the text was intended to be educational and covered evolution, biology and issues then facing homosexuals. From 1904 to 1905, Holzmann edited the journal Der Kampf: Zeitschrift für gesunden Menschenverstand (The Struggle: Journal for Common Sense). Though it was not published by any particular organization, the journal was anarchist in outlook. In addition to fictional stories, Der Kampf published articles on various topics, including many about homosexuality. Among its writers were Else Lasker-Schüler, Herwarth Walden, Franz Pfemfert, Peter Hille, and Erich Mühsam and, at its best, it had a circulation of up to 10,000. During this time, Holzmann wrote an article entitled "Die Homosexualität als Kulturbewegung" ("Homosexuality as a Cultural Movement"). He argued that the right to privacy entailed that "no one has the right to intrude in the private matters of another, to meddle in another's personal views and orientations, and that ultimately it is no one's business what two freely consenting adults do in their homes." He attacked Paragraph 175 of the German criminal code which criminalized homosexual acts.

To him, the struggle against the prohibition of homosexual acts was part of a larger struggle for emancipation. He disagreed with the mainstream socialist movement, namely the Social Democratic Party of Germany (SPD), that viewed the repeal of Paragraph 175 as a minor issue. He also opposed the SPD's tactic of forcefully outing gays, such as the steel magnate Friedrich Alfred Krupp, in order to bring about the repeal of Paragraph 175. He called this tactic an "indecent weapon", saying that anyone who practices it "is willing to remove ground under his own feet by practicing the very injustice that he opposes". He also disagreed with many other German gay rights activists such as Adolf Brand who did not see their struggle as part of a wider movement. Holzmann's views were not entirely uncontroversial in the German anarchist movement either. Max Nettlau and Gustav Landauer, both well-known anarchists, criticized Der Kampf's sexual politics.

During his time in Berlin, he knew a number of well-known writers and bohemians. He was very close friends with Else Lasker-Schüler, a famous Expressionist poet. She was the one who gave the nickname Senna Hoy, a reversal of his first name, but also had several other pet names for him. Erich Mühsam also had great respect for Holzmann, though he sometimes criticized him for his "somewhat fanciful and adventurous demeanor". The Austrian anarchist Pierre Ramus called him "the most indefatigable Bohemian proletarian of the German-speaking anarchist movement". Holzmann's work was repeatedly the target of censorship by the Prussian authorities. Of the 25 issues of Der Kampf, 11 were banned. In 1905, Holzmann fled Prussia and moved to Zurich, Switzerland. Sources disagree on what led him to flee. According to Walter Fähnders, a professor for German literature, it was because he wrote a short text that could interpreted as a depiction of a homosexual encounter. It was to be published in Der Kampf. However, the issue was banned and confiscated, because it was deemed obscene. At the same time and for the same reason, the government confiscated nude drawings by the artist Fidus and banned the poem "Die Freundschaft" ("Friendship") by Friedrich Schiller, one of the best known poets in German history. Holzmann was sentenced to either pay a fine or spend six days in prison. Instead, he decided to flee Prussia and move to Switzerland. According to Stefan Otto, a journalist, however, he had been monitored by the police. Annoyed by this, he wrote a letter to the chief of the Berlin police, threatening to punch the next person he caught spying on him in the face. For this, he was sentenced to four months in prison, but he decided to flee rather than serve the sentence, according to Otto.

== Zurich ==
Once in Zurich, he worked for a newspaper called Der Weckruf (The Wake-up Call). He was arrested once more and deported. He sneaked back into Switzerland. He tried to stay in hiding by faking his own death. He wrote an obituary for himself claiming that he had been killed in the course of a prisoners' escape. After this was exposed, he was disgraced, even within the anarchist scene. Therefore, he decided to leave Zurich. After spending a couple of months in Paris, he decided to move to Russia.

== Russia and death ==
He opted for Russia, having reported on the 1905 Russian Revolution in Der Kampf, because he thought Europe's future depended on the outcome of revolutionary developments in that country. He joined an anarchist federation in Poland, then part of the Russian Empire. He assisted that organization for several weeks, robbing rich merchants to fund the group's activities. In June 1907, he was caught and sentenced to fifteen years of hard labor. Back in Germany, lawyers and Holzmann's friends set off a campaign to secure his freedom, above all Else Lasker-Schüler. She also collected money so she could travel to Russia and visit him. She did so in 1913. She was able to meet with him in an insane asylum near Moscow. Having struggled for his release for years, his supporters finally managed to convince the Russian authorities to let him go. However, the German authorities refused to let him back into the country, so he was forced to remain incarcerated in Russia. Meanwhile, Holzmann's health deteriorated. He suffered from malnutrition and typhus and died on 28 April 1914.

After Holzmann's death, Karl Liebknecht, a socialist leader and member of the Reichstag, launched a parliamentary inquiry into why Holzmann was not allowed to return to Germany. Franz Pfemfert dedicated an issue of the socialist journal Die Aktion to Holzmann. Lasker-Schüler wrote a poem about her visit, entitled "Der Malik". Holzmann's body was returned to Berlin and he was buried in the Weißensee Jewish cemetery.

== See also ==
- Anarchism in Germany

== Bibliography ==
- Fähnders, Walter (1995). "Anarchism and Homosexuality in Wilhelmine Germany: Senna Hoy, Erich Mühsam, John Henry Mackay". Journal of Homosexuality. 29 (2–3): 117–154. doi:10.1300/J082v29n02_05. ISSN 0091-8369. PMID 8666752.
- Cohn, Jesse (21 April 2009). "Hoy, Senna (1882-1914)". In Ness, Immanuel (ed.). The International Encyclopedia of Revolution and Protest: 1500 to the Present. Wiley-Blackwell. p. 1609. ISBN 9781405184649.
- Otto, Stefan (1 November 2007). "Ein "wilder Hund"". Wochenzeitung (in German).
