= Socialism and LGBTQ rights =

The connection between left-wing ideologies and LGBTQ rights struggles has a long and mixed history. The status of LGBTQ people in socialist states have varied throughout history.

== Scientific and utopian socialism ==
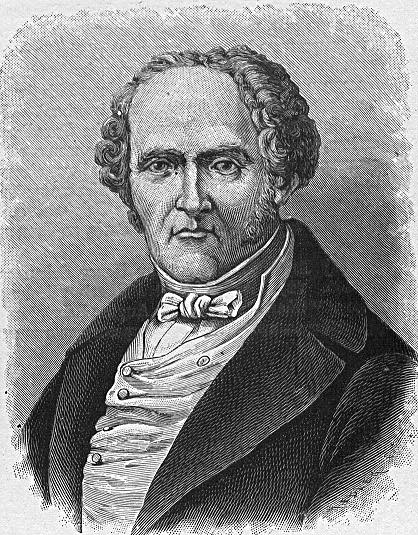
Charles Fourier, a utopian socialist who coined the word feminism in 1837 and defended same-sex sexuality

The first currents of modern socialist thought emerged in Europe in the early 19th century. They are now often described with the phrase utopian socialism. Gender and sexuality were significant concerns for many of the leading thinkers such as Charles Fourier and Henri de Saint-Simon in France and Robert Owen in Britain as well as their followers, many of whom were women. Fourier believed, for example, that true freedom could only occur without masters, without the ethos of work, and without suppressing passions; the suppression of passions is not only destructive to the individual, but to society as a whole. Writing before the advent of the term 'homosexuality', Fourier recognized that both men and women have a wide range of sexual needs and preferences which may change throughout their lives, including same-sex sexuality and androgénité. He argued that all sexual expressions should be enjoyed as long as people are not abused or hurt, and that "affirming one's difference" can actually enhance social integration.

Alongside other prominent thinkers at the time, Fourier believed scientific understanding to be a standard of any society to live up to. Émile Durkheim is known for being one of the first people to provide the idea of having to understand utopian socialism with the rise of social sciences; however, through further evaluation of these thinkings Fourier and Saint-Simon were not seen as heads of the emerging scientific socialist movement. With integration of scientific thought into a social perspective, there would be further discourse within the topics of family, education and especially sexuality. Fourier in particular had a doctrine specifically detailing complexities surrounding the full expression of human passions. The doctrine that Fourier expresses some of these views is known in French as Nouveau monde amoureux, which means New World in Love. The ideas expressed by early utopian socialists would help influence many women to become a part of the movement and were quite instrumental towards the emergence of the feminist movement. The idea of social reshaping was matching the thinking of utopian socialism. In fact, the reemergence of Fouriers works in the 1960s would contribute further to the rising movements of feminism and LGBT because of interest in sexual liberties. Durkheim was known to show concern through a more scientific approach rather than a political one. He was also very adamant about the significance of the study of Sociology as it was believed to shape the humanist subjects of philosophy, history and psychology. Durkheim is also known for establishing L'Année Sociologique, which is the first journal of social science in France in 1898.

=== Germany ===
From the earliest European homosexual rights movements, activists such as Karl Heinrich Ulrichs and Magnus Hirschfeld approached the Left for support. During the 1860s, Ulrichs wrote to Karl Marx and sent him a number of books on Uranian (homosexual/transgender) emancipation, and in 1869, Marx passed one of Ulrichs' books on to Friedrich Engels. Engels responded with disgust to Marx in a private letter, lashing out at "pederasts" who are "extremely against nature", and described Ulrichs' platform of homosexual rights as "turning smut into theory". He worried that things would go badly for heterosexuals like himself should homosexual rights be gained.

Both Marx and Engels have tangled with the idea of liberty pertaining to love and have made these ideas public. A small time after the death of Marx, Engels had said "that with every great revolutionary movement the question of 'free love' comes to the foreground." This is due to the known rejection of the family institution for the purpose of that free love notion as described by Engels. This would in turn spark much opposition towards the socialist movement by the German government by instituting laws from the mid to late 1800s outlawing any attack whether physical or verbal on the institution of family. Much of this work pushed by Marx and Engels was influential to the leader of the socialist women's movement in the late 1800s. It is from the work with Marx and the work produced after the death of Marx that Engels had been able to influence a plethora of socialist thinkers as well as those who belong to feminist thinking. The work consisting of the family dynamic had Marx and Engels express their concerns under three main points which were showing the hypocrisy surrounding the institution of the family especially within bourgeois, the historical context surrounding the beginning of families, and look into the future of families under a communist state. Most thinkers belonging to Marxism would then realize that Marx and Engels were set on dismantling the institution of the family. In 1843–1844, Marx had been introduced to these ideas surrounding the institution of families in Paris because of fellow socialist thinkers such as Charles Fourier that had immense influence among social thinkers in France. Fourier had also previously published writings specifying his stance on families and the favoring of replacing monogamous marriages in order to suit what Fourier called a "Greater latitude of sexual passions" and this work producing such notions was in a piece named Oeuvres Completes, its first volume published in 1841. This would also in turn promote some influence for future socialist thinkers who happen to be a part of pro-LGBT movements across the world.

Jean Baptista von Schweitzer, German socialist arrested on a homosexual charge in 1862

Known to both Ulrichs and Marx was the case of Jean Baptista von Schweitzer, an important labor organizer who had been charged with attempting to solicit a teenage boy in a park in 1862. Social democratic leader Ferdinand Lassalle defended Schweitzer on the grounds that while he personally found homosexuality to be dirty, the labor movement needed the leadership of Schweitzer too much to abandon him, and that a person's sexual tastes had "absolutely nothing to do with a man's political character". Schweitzer would go on to become President of the German Labor Union, and the first Social Democrat elected to a parliament in Europe.

August Bebel's Woman under Socialism (1879), the "single work dealing with sexuality most widely read by rank-and-file members of the Social Democratic Party of Germany (SPD)", can be seen as another example of the ambiguous position towards homosexuality in the German labor movement. On the one hand, Bebel warned socialists of the dangers of same-sex love. Bebel attributed "this crime against nature" in both men and women to sexual indulgence and excess, describing it as an upper-class, metropolitan and foreign vice. On the other hand, he publicly supported the efforts to legalize homosexuality. For example, he signed the first petition of the "Wissenschaftlich-humanitärer Kreis", a study group led by Magnus Hirschfeld, trying to explain homosexuality from a scientific point of view and pushing for decriminalization. In an article for Gay News in 1978, John Lauritsen considers August Bebel as the first important politician "to speak out in public debate" in the favor of gay rights since he attacked the criminalization of homosexuality in a Reichstag debate in 1898.

The leading figure of the LGBT movement in Germany from the turn of the 20th century until the Nazi government came to power in 1933 was undoubtedly Magnus Hirschfeld. Hirschfeld, who was also a socialist and supporter of the women's movement, formed the Scientific-Humanitarian Committee to campaign against German Penal Code Section 175 which outlawed male-male sex. Hirschfeld's organization did a deal with the SPD (of which Lassalle and Schweitzer had been members) to get them to put forward a bill in the Reichstag in 1898, but it was opposed in the Reichstag and failed to pass. Most of Hirschfeld's circle of homosexual activists had socialist politics, including Kurt Hiller, Richard Linsert, Johanna Elberskirchen and Bruno Vogel. After the toppling of the German monarchy, the struggle against § 175 was continued by some social democrats. The German Minister of Justice Gustav Radbruch, member of the Social Democratic Party, tried to erase the paragraph from the German penal law; however, his efforts were to no avail. Also, some Queer cinema began to emerge to show what life for a gay individual was like in West Germany. These characters are also distrustful of Bourgeoisie but hold these feelings of sexual nature dearly. The use of this piece of cinema in the 70's proved to be effective through influential advertisement of ideas. It was actually after these films took place in 1971 that the first gay rights organization was formed in west Berlin. While there was still separation of eastern and western sides of Berlin, the east has proven to be much more lenient on the matter of gay rights. This comes with major reforms through legislation and repealing of Nazi-era anti-sodomy laws.

=== Britain ===
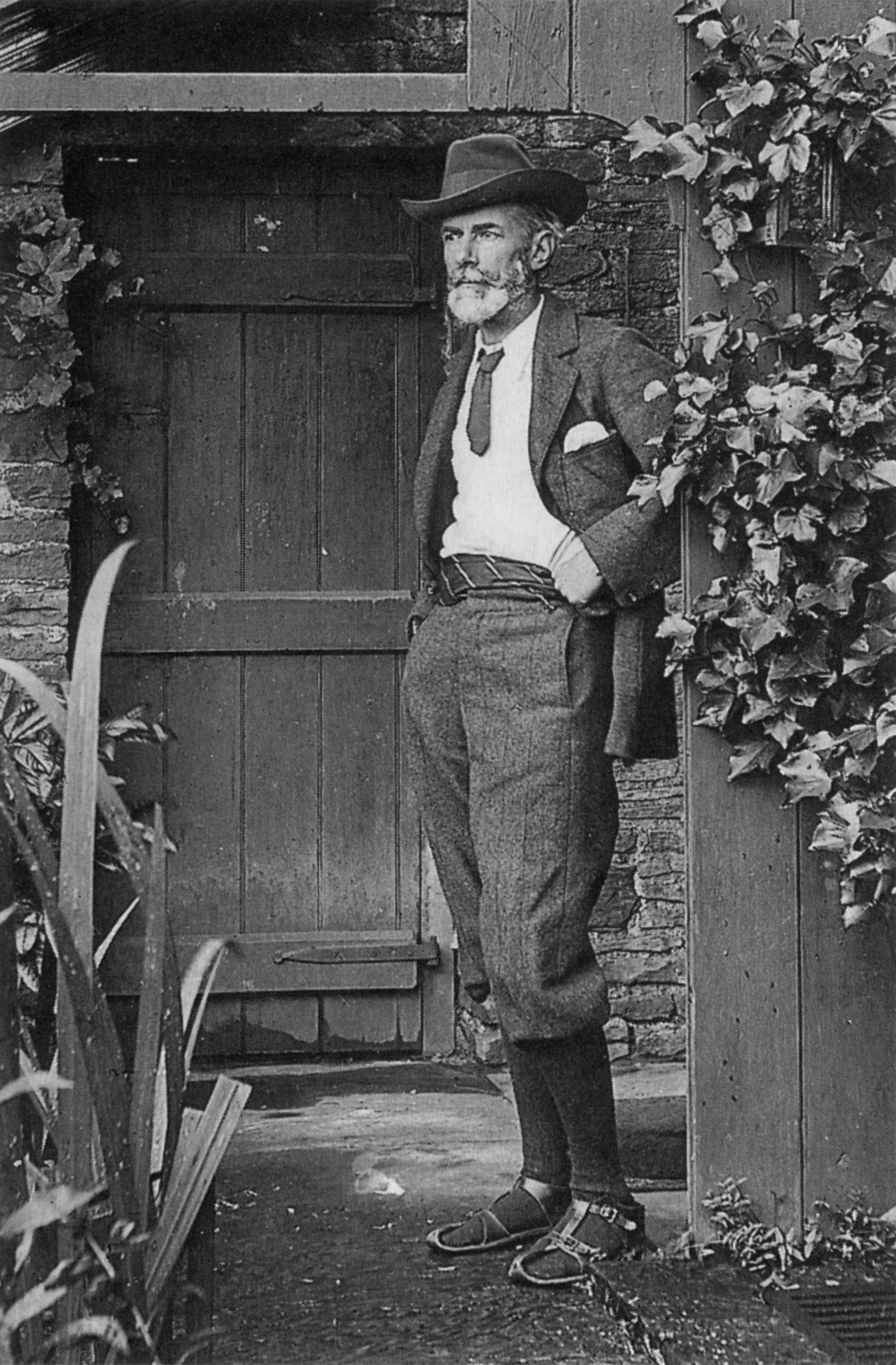
Edward Carpenter, influential British socialist within the Fabian Society, the Labour Party and an early LGBTI activist and theorist

In Oscar Wilde's The Soul of Man Under Socialism, he advocates for an egalitarian society where wealth is shared by all, while warning of the dangers of authoritarian socialism that would crush individuality. He later commented, "I think I am rather more than a Socialist. I am something of an Anarchist, I believe." In August 1894, Wilde wrote to his lover, Lord Alfred Douglas, to tell of "a dangerous adventure". He had gone out sailing with two boys, Stephen and Alphonso, and they were caught in a storm. He wrote, "We took five hours in an awful gale to come back! [And we] did not reach pier till eleven o'clock at night, pitch dark all the way, and a fearful sea. ... All the fishermen were waiting for us. ... Tired, cold, and 'wet to the skin', the three men immediately 'flew to the hotel for hot brandy and water'. But there was a problem. The law stood in the way: 'As it was past ten o'clock on a Sunday night the proprietor could not sell us any brandy or spirits of any kind! So he had to give it to us. The result was not displeasing, but what laws!'" Wilde finished the story, "Both Alphonso and Stephen are now anarchists, I need hardly say."

In the earlier days of England men were being arrested for passing as members of the opposite sex and were widely stigmatized for cross-dressing because they were thought to be prostitutes. A certain case pertaining to this would be one in the year 1870 when Frederick Park (Fanny) and Ernest Boulton (Stella) were arrested for being men in women's clothing and framed for committing crimes. One of the earliest places of LGBT persuasions or gatherings would be a place in north Yorkshire called Cataractonium and has presented a grave sight discovered by archaeologists. It is said that this grave is dated back to 4 BC and was known as a male that had apparently self-castrated and committed to cross dressing to please a priestess/goddess by the name of Cybele. This was the ritual expected from a Roman Gallus at the time. Another instance had occurred in London around 1395, when a young man named John Rykener had been arrested for having sexual relations dressed as a woman. John would be accused of committing the unspeakable of that time. When speaking to the authorities John had specified how he would prostitute as a man in women's clothes. This would be a significant instance in which gender nonconformity was happening in medieval times of England.

Edward Carpenter was a leading figure in late 19th- and early 20th-century Britain being instrumental in the foundation of the Fabian Society and the Labour Party. The 1890s saw Carpenter in a concerted effort to campaign against discrimination on the grounds of sexual orientation. He strongly believed that same-sex attraction was a natural orientation for people of a third sex. His 1908 book on the subject, The Intermediate Sex, would become a foundational text of the LGBT movements of the 20th century. The Intermediate Sex: A Study of Some Transitional Types of Men and Women expressed his views on homosexuality. Carpenter argues that "uranism", as he terms homosexuality, was on the increase marking a new age of sexual liberation. He continued to work in the early part of the 20th century composing works on the "Homogenic question". The publication in 1902 of his groundbreaking anthology of poems, Ioläus: An Anthology of Friendship, was a huge underground success, leading to a more advanced knowledge of homoerotic culture. In April 1914, Carpenter and his friend Laurence Housman founded the British Society for the Study of Sex Psychology. Some of the topics addressed in lecture and publication by the society included: the promotion of the scientific study of sex; a more rational attitude towards sexual conduct and problems and questions connected with sexual psychology (from medical, juridical, and sociological aspects), birth control, abortion, sterilization, venereal diseases, and all aspects of prostitution.

== Anarchism, libertarian socialism and LGBT rights ==
In Europe and North America, the free love movement combined ideas revived from utopian socialism with anarchism and feminism to attack the "hypocritical" sexual morality of the Victorian era, and the institutions of marriage and the family that were alleged to enslave women. Free lovers advocated voluntary sexual unions with no state interference and affirmed the right to sexual pleasure for both women and men, sometimes explicitly supporting the rights of homosexuals and prostitutes. For a few decades, adherence to "free love" became widespread among European and American anarchists, but these views were opposed at the time by Marxists and social democrats. Suffragette and socialist Victoria Woodhull was expelled from the International Workingmen's Association in 1871 for her involvement in the free love and associated movements. Indeed, with Marx's support, the American branch of the organization was purged of its pacifist, anti-racist, and feminist elements, which were accused of putting too much emphasis on issues unrelated to class struggle and were therefore seen to be incompatible with scientific socialism.

The Verband Fortschrittlicher Frauenvereine (League of Progressive Women's Associations), a turn of the 20th century left-wing organization led by Lily Braun campaigned for the decriminalisation of homosexuality in Germany and aimed at organizing prostitutes into labour unions. The broader labour movement either attacked the League, saying they were utopians, or ignored it, and Braun was driven out of the international Marxist movement. Helene Stöcker, another German activist from the left wing of the women's movement, became heavily involved in the sexual reform movement in 1919, after World War I, and served on the board of the Institut für Sexualwissenschaft. She also campaigned to protect single mothers and their children from economic and moral persecution. Anarcho-syndicalist writer Ulrich Linse wrote about "a sharply outlined figure of the Berlin individualist anarchist cultural scene around 1900", the "precocious Johannes Holzmann" (known as Senna Hoy): "an adherent of free love, [Hoy] celebrated homosexuality as a 'champion of culture' and engaged in the struggle against Paragraph 175."

The young Hoy (born 1882) published these views in his weekly magazine (Kampf, in English "Struggle") from 1904, which reached a circulation of 10,000 the following year. German anarchist psychotherapist Otto Gross also wrote extensively about same-sex sexuality in both men and women and argued against its discrimination. Heterosexual anarchist Robert Reitzel (1849–1898) spoke positively of homosexuality from the beginning of the 1890s in his German-language journal "Der arme Teufel" (Detroit). Across the Atlantic, in New York's Greenwich Village, Bohemian feminists and socialists advocated self-realization and pleasure for women (and also men) in the here and now, as well as campaigning against the First World War and for other anarchist and socialist causes. They encouraged playing with sexual roles and sexuality, and the openly bisexual radical Edna St. Vincent Millay and the lesbian anarchist Margaret Anderson were prominent among them. The Villagers took their inspiration from the mostly anarchist immigrant female workers from the period 1905–1915, and the "New Life Socialism" of Edward Carpenter, Havelock Ellis and Olive Schreiner. Discussion groups organized by the Villagers were frequented by the Russian anarchist Emma Goldman, among others. Magnus Hirschfeld noted in 1923 that Goldman "has campaigned boldly and steadfastly for individual rights, and especially for those deprived of their rights. Thus it came about that she was the first and only woman, indeed the first and only American, to take up the defense of homosexual love before the general public." In fact, prior to Goldman, heterosexual anarchist Robert Reitzel (1849–98) spoke positively of homosexuality from the beginning of the 1890s in his German-language journal "Der arme Teufel" (Detroit). During her life, Goldman was lionized as a free-thinking "rebel woman" by admirers, and derided by critics as an advocate of politically motivated murder and violent revolution. Her writing and lectures spanned a wide variety of issues, including prisons, atheism, freedom of speech, militarism, capitalism, marriage, free love, and homosexuality. Although she distanced herself from first-wave feminism and its efforts toward women's suffrage, she developed new ways of incorporating gender politics into anarchism. After decades of obscurity, Goldman's iconic status was revived in the 1970s, when feminist and anarchist scholars rekindled popular interest in her life.

Mujeres Libres was an anarchist women's organization in Spain that aimed to empower working-class women. It was founded in 1936 by Lucía Sánchez Saornil, Mercedes Comaposada and Amparo Poch y Gascón and had approximately 30,000 members. The organization was based on the idea of a "double struggle" for women's liberation and social revolution and argued that the two objectives were equally important and should be pursued in parallel. In order to gain mutual support, they created networks of women anarchists. Flying day-care centres were set up in efforts to involve more women in union activities. Lucía Sánchez Saornil was a Spanish poet, militant anarchist and feminist. She is best known as one of the founders of Mujeres Libres and served in the Confederación Nacional del Trabajo (CNT) and Solidaridad Internacional Antifascista (SIA). By 1919, she had been published in a variety of journals, including Los Quijotes, Tableros, Plural, Manantial and La Gaceta Literaria. Working under a male pen name, she was able to explore lesbian themes, at a time when homosexuality was criminalized and subject to censorship and punishment. Writing in anarchist publications such as Earth and Freedom, the White Magazine and Workers' Solidarity, Lucía outlined her perspective as a feminist. Although quiet on the subject of birth control, she attacked the essentialism of gender roles in Spanish society. In this way, Lucía established herself as one of the most radical of voices among anarchist women, rejecting the ideal of female domesticity which remained largely unquestioned. In a series of articles for Workers' Solidarity, she boldly refuted Gregorio Marañón's identification of motherhood as the nucleus of female identity.

=== European gay anarchists ===
Anarchism's foregrounding of individual freedoms made for a natural marriage with homosexuality in the eyes of many, both inside and outside of the Anarchist movement. Emil Szittya, in Das Kuriositäten-Kabinett (1923), wrote about homosexuality that "very many anarchists have this tendency. Thus I found in Paris a Hungarian anarchist, Alexander Sommi, who founded a homosexual anarchist group on the basis of this idea." His view is confirmed by Magnus Hirschfeld in his 1914 book Die Homosexualität des Mannes und des Weibes: "In the ranks of a relatively small party, the anarchist, it seemed to me as if proportionately more homosexuals and effeminates are found than in others." Italian anarchist Luigi Bertoni (who Szittya also believed to be gay) said that "Anarchists demand freedom in everything, thus also in sexuality. Homosexuality leads to a healthy sense of egoism, for which every anarchist should strive."

Anarcho-syndicalist writer Ulrich Linse wrote about "a sharply outlined figure of the Berlin individualist anarchist cultural scene around 1900", the "precocious Johannes Holzmann" (known as Senna Hoy): "an adherent of free love, [Hoy] celebrated homosexuality as a 'champion of culture' and engaged in the struggle against Paragraph 175." The young Hoy (born 1882) published these views in his weekly magazine, Kampf, from 1904 which reached a circulation of 10,000 the following year. German anarchist psychotherapist Otto Gross also wrote extensively about same-sex sexuality in both men and women and argued against its discrimination. In the 1920s and 1930s, French individualist anarchist publisher Émile Armand campaigned for acceptance of free love, including homosexuality, in his journal L'en dehors.

The individualist anarchist Adolf Brand was originally a member of Hirschfeld's Scientific-Humanitarian committee, but formed a break-away group. Brand and his colleagues, known as the Gemeinschaft der Eigenen, were heavily influenced by homosexual anarchist John Henry Mackay. The group despised effeminacy and saw homosexuality as an expression of manly virility available to all men, espousing a form of nationalistic masculine Lieblingminne (chivalric love) that would later be linked to the rise of Nazism. They were opposed to Hirschfeld's medical characterisation of homosexuality as the domain of an "intermediate sex". Brand "toyed with anti-Semitism", and disdained Hirschfeld on the grounds that he was Jewish. Ewald Tschek, another gay anarchist writer of the era, regularly contributed to Adolf Brand's journal Der Eigene, and wrote in 1925 that Hirschfeld's Scientific Humanitarian Committee was a danger to the German people, caricaturing Hirschfeld as "Dr. Feldhirsch".

=== Anarchist homophobia ===
Whilst these pro-homosexual stances had begun to surface, many members of the anarchist movement of the time still believed that nature/a divine Creator had provided a perfect answer to human relationships; an editorial in an influential Spanish anarchist journal from 1935 argued that an Anarchist must even avoid any relationship with homosexuals: "If you are an anarchist, that means that you are more morally upright and physically strong than the average man. And he who likes inverts is no real man, and is therefore no real anarchist." However, despite that view, many 21st-century anarchists accept homosexuality.

== Homophile movement and socialism in the United States ==
McCarthyism in the US believed a "homosexual underground" was abetting the "communist conspiracy", which was sometimes called the Homintern. A number of homosexual rights groups came into being during this period. These groups, now known as the "homophile" movement, often had left-wing or socialist politics, such as the communist Mattachine Society and the Dutch COC which originated on the left. In the context of the highly politicized Cold War environment, homosexuality became framed as a dangerous, contagious social disease that posed a potential threat to state security. This era also witnessed the establishment of widely spread FBI surveillance intended to identify homosexual government employees.

Harry Hay, who is seen by many as the father of the modern gay rights movement in the United States, was originally a trade union activist. In 1934, he organized an important 83-day-long workers' strike of the port of San Francisco with his lover, actor Will Geer. He was an active member of the Communist Party USA. Hay and the Mattachine Society were among the first to argue that gay people were not just individuals but in fact represented a "cultural minority". They even called for public marches of homosexuals, predicting later gay pride parades. Hay's concept of the "cultural minority" came directly from his Marxist studies, and the rhetoric that he and his colleague Charles Rowland employed often reflected the militant Communist tradition. The Communist Party did not officially allow gays to be members, claiming that homosexuality was a "deviation"; perhaps more important was the fear that a member's (usually secret) homosexuality would leave them open to blackmail and made them a security risk in an era of red-baiting. Concerned to save the party difficulties, as he put more energy into the Mattachine Society, Hay himself approached the CP's leaders and recommended his own expulsion. After much soul-searching, the CP, clearly reeling at the loss of a respected member and theoretician of 18 years' standing, refused to expel Hay as a homosexual, instead expelling him under the more convenient ruse of "security risk", while ostentatiously announcing him to be a "Lifelong Friend of the People". The Mattachine Society was the second gay rights organization that Hay established, the first being 'Bachelors for Wallace (1948) in support of Henry Wallace's progressive presidential candidacy. The Encyclopedia of Homosexuality reports that "As Marxists the founders of the group believed that the injustice and oppression which they suffered stemmed from relationships deeply embedded in the structure of American society".

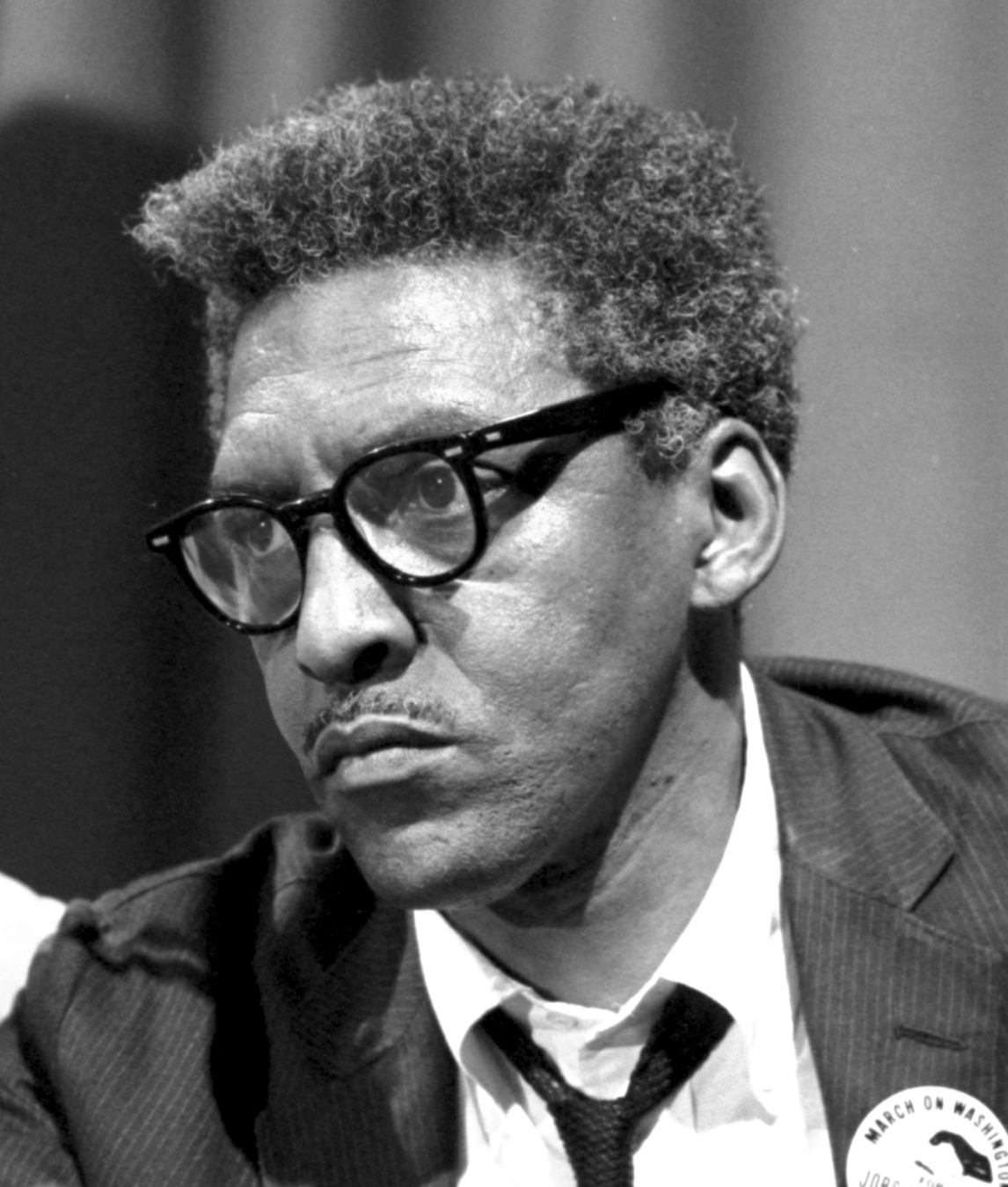
Bayard Rustin, prominent American socialist and African American civil rights and LGBTI activist

In 1951, the Socialist Party of America was close to adopting a platform plank in favor of gay rights, with one article in the Youth Socialist Party press supporting such a move. African American socialist and civil rights activist Bayard Rustin was arrested in Pasadena, California, in 1953 for homosexual activity with two other men in a parked car. Originally charged with vagrancy and lewd conduct, he pleaded guilty to a single, lesser charge of "sex perversion" (as consensual sodomy was officially referred to in California then) and served 60 days in jail. This was the first time that his homosexuality had come to public attention. He had been and remained candid about his sexuality, although homosexuality was still criminalized throughout the United States. In 1957, Rustin and Martin Luther King Jr. began organizing the Southern Christian Leadership Conference (SCLC). Many African American leaders were concerned that Rustin's sexual orientation and past Communist membership would undermine support for the civil rights movement. U.S. Representative Adam Clayton Powell Jr., who was a member of the SCLC's board, forced Rustin's resignation from the SCLC in 1960 by threatening to discuss Rustin's morals charge in Congress.

A few weeks before the March on Washington for Jobs and Freedom in August 1963, Senator Strom Thurmond railed against Rustin as a "Communist, draft-dodger, and homosexual", and had the entire Pasadena arrest file entered in the record. Thurmond also produced a Federal Bureau of Investigation photograph of Rustin talking to King while King was bathing, to imply that there was a same-sex relationship between the two. Both men denied the allegation of an affair. Rustin was instrumental in organizing the March on Washington for Jobs and Freedom on August 7, 1963. He drilled off-duty police officers as marshals, bus captains to direct traffic, and scheduled the podium speakers. Eleanor Holmes Norton and Rachelle Horowitz were aides. Despite King's support, NAACP chairman Roy Wilkins did not want Rustin to receive any public credit for his role in planning the march. Nevertheless, he became well known. On September 6, 1963, Rustin and Randolph appeared on the cover of Life magazine as "the leaders" of the March. Throughout the 1970s and 1980s, Rustin worked as a human rights and election monitor for Freedom House. He also testified on behalf of New York State's Gay Rights Bill. In 1986, he gave a speech "The New Niggers Are Gays", in which he asserted:

Today, blacks are no longer the litmus paper or the barometer of social change. Blacks are in every segment of society and there are laws that help to protect them from racial discrimination. The new "niggers" are gays. ... It is in this sense that gay people are the new barometer for social change. ... The question of social change should be framed with the most vulnerable group in mind: gay people.

== Socialist states ==
The Soviet Government of the RSFSR decriminalized homosexuality in December 1917, following the October Revolution and the discarding of the Legal Code of Tzarist Russia. Effectively the Soviet government decriminalized homosexuality in Russia and Ukraine after 1917. However, other states in the USSR continued to ascribe legal punishments on sodomy. This policy of decriminalizing homosexuality in the RSFSR and Ukrainian SSR endured for the bulk of the 1920s – until the Stalinist era. In 1933, the Soviet government, under Stalin, recriminalized homosexuality. On March 7, 1934, Article 121 was added to the criminal code, for the entire Soviet Union, that expressly prohibited only male homosexuality, with up to five years of hard labor in prison. There were no criminal statutes regarding lesbianism. The lowest point in the history of the relationship between socialism and homosexuality begins with the rise of Joseph Stalin in the USSR, after Lenin's death, and continues through the era of state socialism in the Soviet Union, East Germany, China and North Korea. In all cases the conditions of sexual minorities and transgender people worsened in socialist states after the arrival of Stalin. Hundreds of thousands of homosexuals were interned in gulags during the Great Purge, where many were beaten to death. Some Western intellectuals withdrew their support of Communism after seeing the severity of repression in the USSR, including the gay writer André Gide.

Historian Jennifer Evans reports that the East German government "alternated between the view [of homosexual activity] as a remnant of bourgeois decadence, a sign of moral weakness, and a threat to social and political health of the nation." Homosexuality was legalized in East Germany when Article 174 was repealed in 1968. In Czechoslovakia, even after homosexuality was decriminalized in 1961 the secret police (StB) used the threat of disclosure to force homosexuals to cooperate. Homosexuality was a taboo subject and first mentioned on Czech Radio in 1986, despite the AIDS epidemic. Those suspected of being homosexual suffered from employment discrimination. There were a variety of attitudes to homosexuality in the socialist countries. Some states (such as the early Soviet Union prior to 1929–1933) practiced a degree of toleration. Others maintained negative policies towards homosexuals throughout their history, or gradually evolved to positions of relative toleration or official ignorance after the 1960s (East Germany, the USSR, etc.) In less tolerant periods effeminate men and homosexuals were sometimes forced to participate in programs of 'reeducation' involving forced labor, conversion therapy, psychotropic drugs or confinement in psychiatric hospitals.

The revolutionary Cuban gay writer Reinaldo Arenas noted that, shortly after the communist government of Fidel Castro came to power, "persecution began and concentration camps were opened ... the sexual act became taboo while the 'new man' was proclaimed and masculinity exalted." Homosexuality was legalized in Cuba in 1979. Fidel Castro apologized for Cuba's poor historical record on LGBT issues in 2010.

CENESEX, the Cuban National Center for Sex Education was founded in 1989 to help advance the understanding and inclusion of sexually and gender diverse people in Cuba. In the 21st century, spearheaded by the 2022 Cuban Family Code referendum and by the legalisation of same-sex marriage thereafter, Cuban population has seen significant progressive advancements in youth, elder, disabled people's, women's and LGBTQ+ rights.

While there had been no law against sodomy at the time of the USSR's creation, such a law was introduced in 1933, added to the penal code as Article 121, which condemned homosexual relations with penalties of imprisonment up to five years. With the fall of the Soviet regime and the repeal of the law against sex between consenting adult men, prisoners convicted under that part of the law were released very slowly. Homosexuality was legalized in several Eastern Bloc countries under Communism, such as Bulgaria, Czechoslovakia, and Hungary.

== After 1968 ==
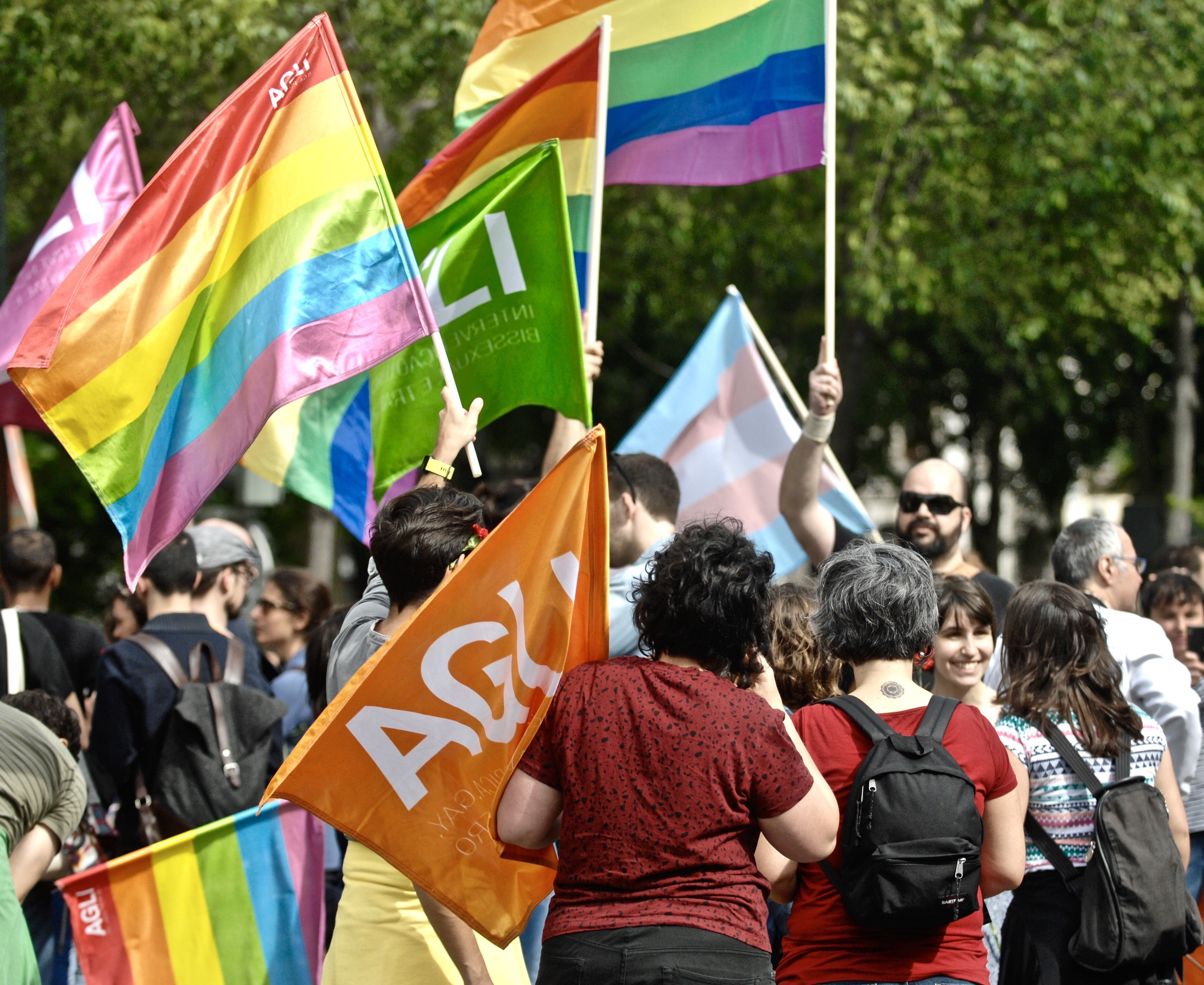
LGBT socialist movement in Portugal

During the emergence of the new social movements of the 1960s and 1970s, the socialist left began to review its relationship to gender, sexuality and identity politics. The writings of the French bisexual anarchist Daniel Guérin offer an insight into the tension sexual minorities among the Left have often felt. He was a leading figure in the French Left from the 1930s until his death in 1988. After coming out in 1965, he spoke about the extreme hostility toward homosexuality that permeated the left throughout much of the 20th century. "Not so many years ago, to declare oneself a revolutionary and to confess to being homosexual were incompatible," Guérin wrote in 1975. In 1954, Guérin was widely attacked for his study of the Kinsey Reports in which he also detailed the oppression of homosexuals in France. "The harshest [criticisms] came from marxists, who tend seriously to underestimate the form of oppression which is antisexual terrorism. I expected it, of course, and I knew that in publishing my book I was running the risk of being attacked by those to whom I feel closest on a political level."

After coming out publicly in 1965, Guérin was abandoned by the Left, and his papers on sexual liberation were censored or refused publication in left-wing journals. From the 1950s, Guérin moved away from Marxism–Leninism and toward a synthesis of anarchism and Marxism close to platformism which allowed for individualism while rejecting capitalism. Guérin was involved in the uprising of May 1968, and was a part of the French Gay Liberation movement that emerged after the events. Decades later, Frédéric Martel described Guérin as the "grandfather of the French homosexual movement". Meanwhile, in the United States late in his career the influential anarchist thinker Paul Goodman came out as bisexual. The freedom with which he revealed, in print and in public, his romantic and sexual relations with men (notably in a late essay, "Being Queer"), proved to be one of the many important cultural springboards for the emerging gay liberation movement of the early 1970s.

The West was less beholden to Soviet ideas. Notable Western gay members of Communist parties included Mark Ashton, founder of Lesbians and Gays Support the Miners and LGBT rights advocate, a member of the Communist Party of Great Britain; and Harry Hay, a gay rights activist, labor advocate, Native American civil rights campaigner, Mattachine Society founder, co-founder of Los Angeles Gay Liberation Front, and a member of the Communist Party USA. Emerging from a number of events, such as the May 1968 insurrection in France, the anti-Vietnam war movement in the US and the Stonewall riots of 1969, militant Gay Liberation organizations began to spring up around the world. Many saw their roots in left radicalism more than in the established homophile groups of the time, such as British and American Gay Liberation Front, the British Gay Left Collective, the Italian Fuori!, the French FHAR, the German Rotzschwule, and the Dutch Red Faggots.

The then styled Gay Lib leaders and writers also came from a left-wing background, such as Dennis Altman, Martin Duberman, Steven Ault, Brenda Howard, John D'Emilio, David Fernbach (writing in the English language), Pierre Hahn and Guy Hocquenghem (in French) and the Italian Mario Mieli. Some were inspired by Herbert Marcuse's Eros and Civilization, which attempts to synthesise the ideas of Karl Marx and Sigmund Freud. 1960s and 1970s radical Angela Davis (who officially came out as a lesbian in 1999) had studied under Marcuse and was greatly influenced by him. In France, gay activist and political theorist Guy Hocquenghem, like many others, developed a commitment to socialism through participating in the May 1968 insurrection. A former member of the French Communist Party, he later joined the Front homosexuel d'action révolutionnaire (FHAR), formed by radical lesbians who split from the Mouvement Homophile de France in 1971, including the left ecofeminist Françoise d'Eaubonne. That same year, the FHAR became the first homosexual group to demonstrate publicly in France when they joined Paris's annual May Day march held by trade unions and left-wing parties.

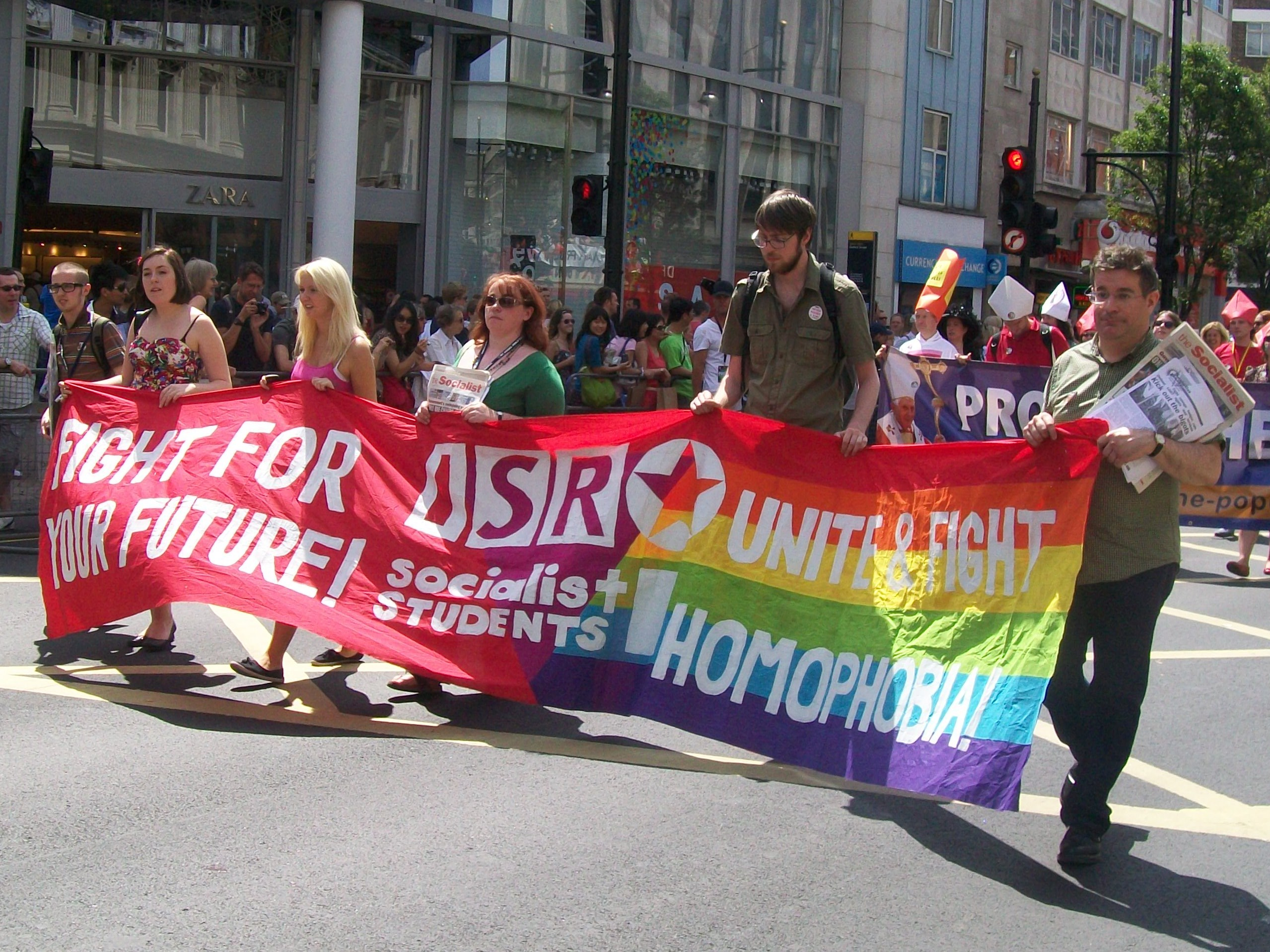
LGBT socialist march in London

In the United Kingdom, the 1980s saw increased LGBT rights opposition from the right-wing Conservative government led by Margaret Thatcher, who introduced Section 28 in 1988 in order to prevent what they saw as the "promotion" of homosexuality as an acceptable lifestyle in schools; however, the Conservatives' main opposition, the Labour Party, did little to address the issue of LGBT rights, ignoring calls from left-wingers such as Ken Livingstone, to do so. Meanwhile, the popular right-wing press featured pejorative references to lesbians, supposedly especially associated with the all-female anti-nuclear protest camp at Greenham Common, and individuals such as Peter Tatchell, the Labour candidate in the 1983 Bermondsey by-election. The growing commercialisation of the Western gay subculture in the late 20th and early 21st centuries (the "pink pound") has come under heavy criticism from socialists. Hannah Dee remarked that it had reached "the point that London Pride – once a militant demonstration in commemoration of the Stonewall riots – has become a corporate-sponsored event far removed from any challenge to the ongoing injustices that we [the LGBT community] face." At the same time, an anti-war coalition between Muslims (many organized through mosques) and the Socialist Workers Party led leading member Lindsey German to reject the use of gay rights as a "shibboleth" that would automatically rule out such alliances.

The American Revolutionary Communist Party's policy that "struggle will be waged to eliminate [homosexuality] and reform homosexuals" was not abandoned until 2001. The RCP now strongly supports gay liberation. Meanwhile, the American Socialist Workers Party (SWP) in the US released a memo stating that gay oppression had less "social weight" than black and women's struggles, and prohibited members from being involved in gay political organizations. They also believed that a close association with gay liberation would give the SWP an "exotic image" and alienate it from the masses. As the gay liberation movement began to gain ground, many socialist organizations actively campaigned for gay rights. Notable examples are the feminist Freedom Socialist Party, the Party for Socialism and Liberation, the International Socialist Organization, Socialist Alternative (United States) and the Socialist Party USA. The Socialist Party USA was the first American political party to nominate an openly gay man for President of the United States, running David McReynolds in 1980.

== See also ==
- Anarchism and LGBT rights
- Communism and LGBT rights
- Left-wing politics § Social progressivism and counterculture
- Lesbians and Gays Support the Miners
- New Left
- Pink capitalism
- Socialist feminism
- Triple oppression
- "New Man" (Marxist concept)
