= Der arme Teufel =

German-American anarchist magazine

Der arme Teufel ("The Poor Devil") was a leading German-American anarchist magazine, published in German at Detroit, Michigan from 1884 to 1900, and edited mainly by the Detroit anarchist Robert Reitzel from 1884 until his death in 1898 and after that by Martin Drescher.

== History ==
The first two volumes of the magazine were mainly concerned with the freethought movement, and primarily consisted of articles on the subject of religious criticism. In issue # 583 (February 1, 1886), the editor, Robert Reitzel, declared that Der arme Teufel was now an anarchist publication. According to Max Nettlau, the magazine was "a treasure-trove of earnest and likable liberal and rebellious sentiments and thoughts, cutting-edge social critique and the shredding of Authority in all its forms, open and disguised." Half of the articles were abstracted from the magazines, Gesellschaft (Society), Zeit (Time), Die Zukunft (The Future), the Magazin für Literatur and the satirical journal Simplicissimus. Under the laws of the time issues 86, 88, 93, 100, 104 and 107 were suppressed. Articles on politics as well as literature were preferred. 822 issues were published over 16 volumes. After Reitzel's death in 1898, his friend Martin Drescher continued Der arme Teufel for two years; then followed it with the magazines Wolfsaugen, ein Blatt für freie Geister (Wolf's Eyes: A Paper for Free Spirits), appearing in 1900, and Der Zigeuner (The Gypsy) published at Chicago around 1902.

== Contributors and Staff ==
- Karl Henckell
- John Henry Mackay
- Christian Wagner
- Leo Tolstoy
- Adolf Ehrenberg
- Franz Held
- Edward Fern
- George Herwegh
- Emma Clausen

== Other Anarchist Periodicals of the Same Name ==
- Der arme Teufel, published by Albert Weidner and edited by Erich Mühsam. Appeared from 1902 to 1904.
- Der arme Teufel, appearing in Nordböhmen (Austria). 1906 to ?
- Der arme Teufel, a local newspaper in Ludwigshafen by the Freie Arbeiter-Union Deutschlands (FAUD). Appeared from around 1930 to ?
