= Ricardo Palma Clinic bombing =

Bombing in Lima, Peru

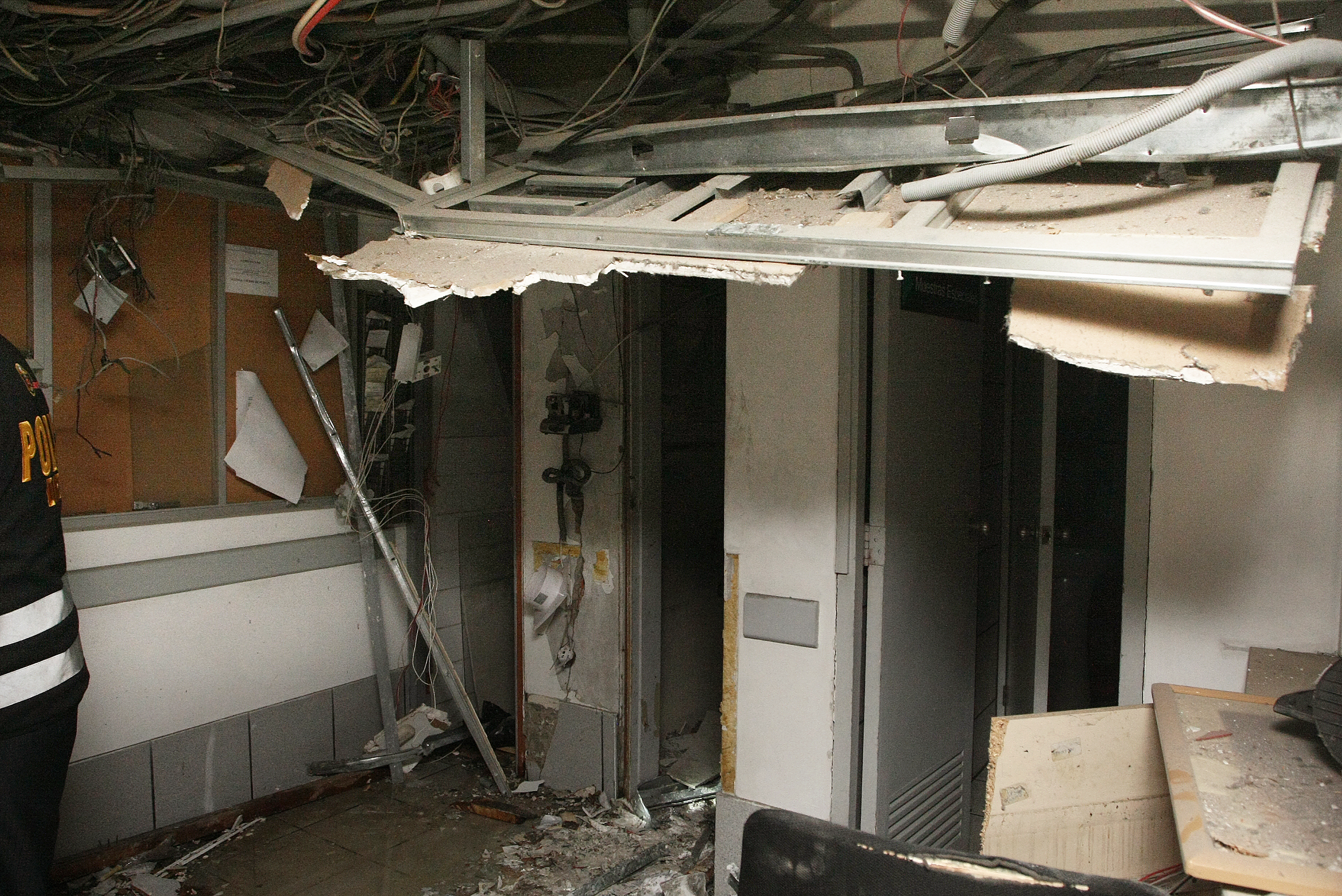
- Inside the clinic after the attack
- Location: San Isidro District, Lima
- Date: July 24, 2018; 11 a.m. (EDT)
- Target: Clinic staff
- Attack type: Bombing; Revenge killing
- Deaths: 0
- Injuries: 37
- Perpetrators: Claudia Rocío Benites Aguirre; Lenin Alexander Benites Aguirre

The Ricardo Palma Clinic bombing was an attack with explosives that occurred in San Isidro District, Lima, Peru, on the morning of July 24, 2018, in the basement of the Ricardo Palma clinic.

== Attack ==
Two backpacks with explosives were placed in the basement of the Ricardo Palma clinic and detonated on the morning of July 24, 2018, with an interval of three minutes from each other. The first explosion occurred in the basement where one of the laboratories is located, while the second occurred in the parking area where an attempt was made against the car of one of the doctors. At least 37 people were injured, including both perpetrators. Facebook activated its Safety Check alert after the explosions.

== Motive ==
Initially, the police considered extortion or intimidation as the motive; according to General Gastón Rodríguez, Lima's police chief, the amount of explosives used was minimal compared to a terrorist attack. When reporting on the progress of the investigation, the National Police of Peru indicated that both perpetrators, who were seriously injured from receiving the impact of the detonation very close, were brothers, Claudia Rocío and Lenin Alexander Benites Aguirre, considering the hypothesis of revenge. The Benites Aguirre brothers hospitalized their mother at the Ricardo Palma clinic but she apparently died of malpractice, which is why they were in legal proceedings. Interior Minister Mauro Medina ruled out as originally stated by the National Prosecutor Pedro Chávarry.

== See also ==
- 2017 Lima shooting, another revenge attack in 2017
