= Prostitution in Peru =

Prostitution in Peru is legal and regulated. UNAIDS estimate there to be 67,000 prostitutes in the country.

== Adult prostitution ==
Prostitution between adults is legal for women and men over 18 years of age if they register with municipal authorities and carry a health certificate. Brothels must be licensed. The vast majority of prostitutes work in the informal sector, where they lack health protection. Individual police officers tolerate the operation of unlicensed brothels.

== Child prostitution ==
Child prostitution is illegal. Penalties for pimps and clients of underage prostitutes range from four to eight years in prison. Child prostitution is common in the country, and especially in Peru's isolated Amazonian mining communities. In the Amazonian department of Madre de Dios the illegal exploitation of gold has dramatically increased the recruitment and coercion of adolescents into prostitution through false employment offers.

While poverty and inequality are important causes of child prostitution, part of the problem is also a social attitude that views sex—including paid sex—between adult men and adolescent girls as normal. Luis Gonzalez-Polar Zuzunada, president of La Restinga (an Iquitos-based nonprofit organization that works with at-risk children) said about teenage prostitution:"It's not seen as a crime. People think that's the way it is. Here, anyone is a potential client."

The Peruvian government recognizes child sex tourism to be a problem, particularly in Iquitos, Madre de Dios, and Cuzco.

== Sex trafficking ==
Peru is a source, transit point, and destination for trafficked persons. The majority of human trafficking occurs within the country.

Many trafficking victims are women and girls from impoverished rural regions of the Amazon, recruited and coerced into prostitution in urban nightclubs, bars, and brothels, often through false employment offers or promises of education.

Domestic trafficking occurs particularly in districts located in the Andes or the Amazon jungle, to bring underage girls into cities or mining areas to work as prostitutes. Victims are recruited by friends or acquaintances and through newspaper and Internet advertisements or street posters offering employment; some victims are recruited by local employment agencies that offer poor young women from rural areas relatively well-paid "restaurant work" in Lima, Cusco, major coastal cities, and abroad.

The principal victims and groups at high risk for trafficking are children and young women from rural or poor urban areas, persons living in poverty, persons with disabilities, victims of domestic abuse, illiterate persons, and persons lacking birth certificates or other identification documents.

Peru also is a destination country for some Ecuadorian and Bolivian women trafficked for commercial sexual exploitation.

The United States Department of State Office to Monitor and Combat Trafficking in Persons ranks Peru as a 'Tier 2' country.
