= 2017 Lima shooting =

Spree shooting in Lima, Peru

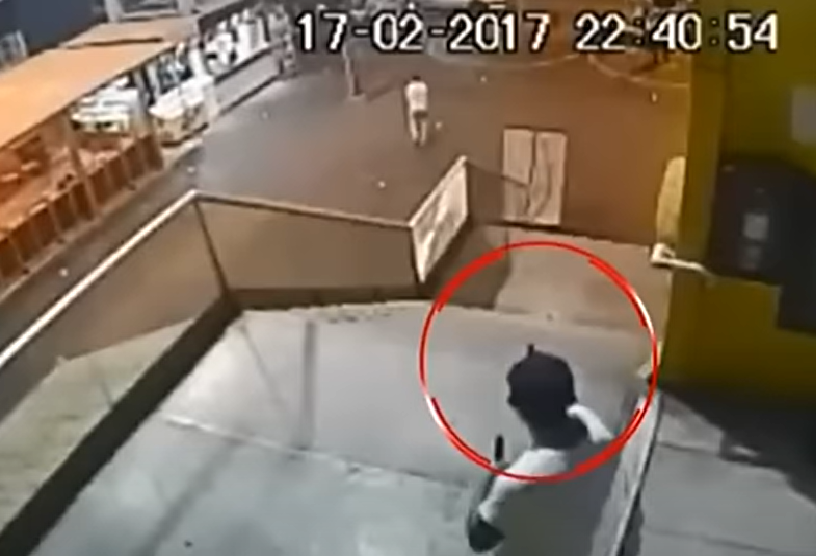
- Eduardo Glicerio Romero Naupay arriving outside the Royal Plaza, the main site where the events took place.
- Location: 11°59′24″S 77°03′46″W; Independencia/San Martín de Porres and Los Olivos, Lima, Peru
- Date: February 17–18, 2017; 10:00 p.m. – 12:00 a.m. (EDT)
- Target: Regulatory officers (at the start of the attack) and civilians
- Attack type: Spree shooting
- Weapons: Bersa Thunder 9; Beretta 92
- Deaths: 6 (including the perpetrator)
- Injuries: 9
- Perpetrator: Eduardo Romero Naupay
- Motive: Eviction from the perpetrator's hawker stall

The 2017 Lima shooting (Spanish: Tiroteo de Lima de 2017) was a mass shooting that began on February 17 and ended on February 18, 2017 at the Royal Plaza shopping center, located in a disputed area between the districts of Independencia and San Martín de Porres, and to a lesser extent in a sector of the district of Los Olivos, in northern Lima, Peru. As a result of the event, six people were killed, including the perpetrator, and nine more were injured.

The perpetrator of the shooting was identified by the police as Eduardo Glicerio Romero Naupay, a 32-year-old man born in the city of Huánuco. Romero had previously served in the Peruvian Navy, where he obtained a license to bear arms. During the shooting, he was killed by Lorenzo Machaca Esquía, a 29-year-old non-commissioned officer who was in civilian clothes at the time of the shooting. It is believed that the motive for the attack was the eviction of his mobile stand selling salchipapas and hamburgers, which had happened the day before because he was in a restricted area and did not have a license to operate as a vendor.

== Background ==
One day before the shooting, Romero had been caught by municipal inspectors from Los Olivos selling food informally at a food cart, for which he was ordered to vacate the place where he worked and told to remove his products and cart. Hours before the attack the day after, Romero posted on his Facebook account at 3:19 p.m. stating that he planned to kill the inspectors who had evicted him.

== Shooting ==
At 10:00 pm. on February 17, 2017, despite the warning given to him the day before, Romero continued to sell with his street vendor in the same place, resulting in the municipal inspectors of Los Olivos arriving. Martín Moreno Zavaleta, one of the inspectors, was tasked with removing Romero and reaching an agreement with him, but the situation escalated when they asked him to hand over his sales cart, telling him that he could pick it up at the warehouse. Once he had paid the fine that the cart would be given back to him. This prompted Romero to shoot Moreno, who was hit 3 three times to the leg, face and abdomen, mortally wounding him. In the midst of the commotion and chaos caused by the shots, Romero fled to the Panamericana Norte junction where he crossed the limits of the aforementioned districts heading to the Royal Plaza shopping center where he climbed the stairs and headed towards the nightclub area. Once there, Romero tried to enter the DiLuna nightclub, but a security worker did not allow him to enter. Romero then shot her, wounding her in the shoulder and neck.

A security member of the nearby Zeven nightclub tried to help the woman but was also shot by the gunman, dying on the spot. Once inside the nightclub, Romero fired indiscriminately, injuring several people. He then left the nightclub and continued to shoot on the second floor of the establishment. However, one of the pistols he was carrying—the Bersa—jammed, forcing him to leave it on the ground for a few moments. He pulled out the second pistol—the Beretta—to continue his attack. He then went to a restaurant and on the way shot Gloria Mostacero, who would become the third victim. After going around the second floor, Romero went down the stairs and continued shooting at a fast food business, killing one. He also opened fire on a kiosk saleswoman, who was uninjured. He then entered a Banco de Crédito bank branch where he fatally shot Nicole Muñoz Peña, a business administration student, who tried to flee by taking refuge in the bank's ATM area. At that moment, the plainclothes policeman Lorenzo Machaca Esquía confronted Eduardo, shooting him in the head and at the front door of the bank. The wounded were taken to a nearby clinic where two more people died.

== Victims ==
6 people (including the perpetrator) were killed and 10 were injured in the attack. A week later, Martín Moreno Zavaleta, who had been shot three times by Romero and had been in a coma, died of cerebral infarction.

=== Killed ===
- César Arellano Chumacero, 32.
- Susan Juárez Pilco, 28.
- Martín Moreno Zavaleta, 51.
- Gloria Mostacero Cruz, 25.
- Nicole Muñoz Peña, 19.
- Eduardo Romero Naupay, 32. (perpetrator)

=== Injured ===
- Edeth Evangelista Hijar. (Shot in the right leg)
- Esperanza López Luján. (Shot in the abdomen)
- Fernanda Valverde Ramírez. (Shot in the lung and right arm)
- Franz Randolf Daga. (Shot in the abdomen)
- Gloria Estefany Valdes Taipen. (Shot in the head)
- Mary Gavilán Huamán. (Shot in the head)
- Noemí Huamanta Coyaton. (Shot in the thorax and abdomen)
- Octavia Morales Anton. (Shot in the neck)
- Silvia Sánchez García. (Shot in the right hand)

== Perpetrator ==
Eduardo Glicerio Romero Naupay (Huánuco, March 29, 1985 — Lima, February 17, 2017), 31, was identified as the perpetrator. He was born in Huánuco and was of Colombian descent. His father committed suicide when he was younger and that caused him to suffer from depression. When he was older he decided to move to Lima and served in the Navy, where he learned to use weapons, and later worked as a security guard, where he obtained his own weapon by falsifying his mental health certificate. After losing his job as a security guard, he decided to start working as a street vendor, getting a food cart by his own means, with which he decided to start working in a restricted area where he was caught several times by municipal inspectors until the shooting.

According to his friends, he suffered a certain sexual and social frustration with women, had an advanced superiority complex as he supported machismo and repudiated feminism, was attracted to the occult and satanism, collected weapons and admired a local hitman. He was also considered a quiet and reserved person, he listened to metal music and was reportedly addicted to Clemente Palma's novels, especially Cuentos malévolos, as confirmed by the police when they raided his house. Members of Romero's family said that "he was withdrawn and uncommunicative."

Online, his actions were celebrated by groups and Facebook pages of which he was a member. One group nicknamed him the "Peruvian Fede" after Federico Guevara, who committed the Monterrey shooting a month earlier.

Romero was buried in the Parque del Recuerdo de los Jardines del Buen Retiro Cemetery, located in Puente Piedra. Only ten people attended the funeral.

== Reactions ==
During a press conference Peruvian President Pedro Pablo Kuczynski said that there was a "lack of control of clandestine pistols", alluding to the shooting. Lorenzo Machaca Esquía, the policeman who killed Romero, was awarded by Kuczynski. Machaca later claimed that he received constant threats through Facebook and other media. A week after the attack, he was reported to police by his wife, who accused him of domestic abuse.

== See also ==
- Ricardo Palma Clinic bombing, another revenge attack in 2018
