= Light Prayer =

Painting by Fidus

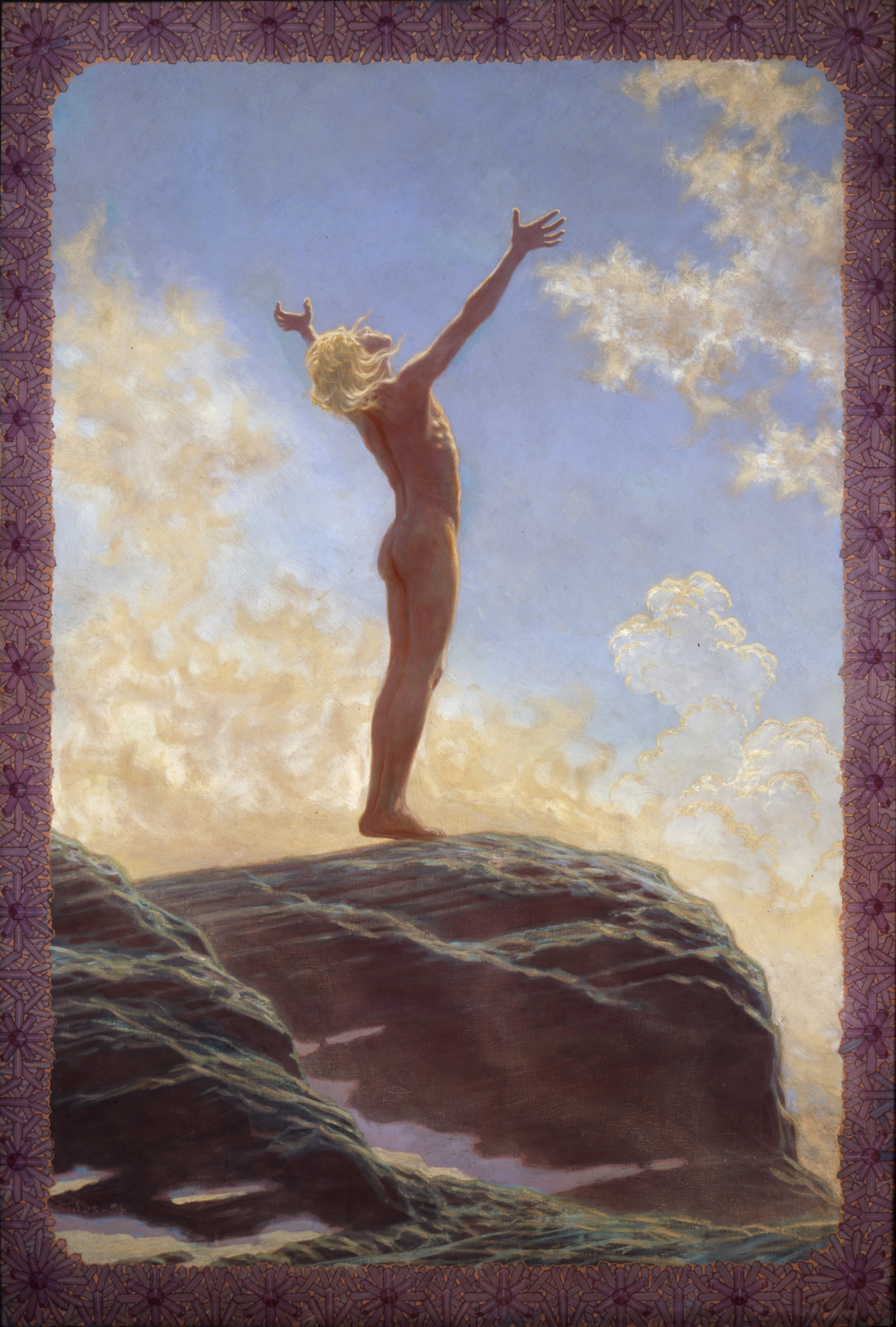
Light Prayer, oil on canvas, 1894, 150 cm × 100 cm (59 in × 39 in), Deutsches Historisches Museum

Light Prayer (German: Lichtgebet) is a painting associated with the German Youth Movement and Lebensreform concept of the late 19th and early 20th centuries. It portrays a young, naked man who stands on a rock and stretches his arms toward the sky. It was created by the German painter Fidus, who from 1890 to 1938 made eleven versions in various media. In 1913, he created a postcard based on the painting that became widely spread in Germany.

Fidus wanted to revitalize society through his paintings and implemented Lebensreform themes such as naturism, light, nature and vitality. Light Prayer is in line with the Youth Movement's programme but also became popular among young people who did not associate it with any particular ideology. Scholars have described possible influences from völkisch occultism, the Norwegian landscape, an idea of universal animation, Anthroposophy, Theosophy, evolution theory and a desire to return to nature. The man's posture has been associated with Guido von List's idea of the Algiz (ᛉ) rune as a life symbol and with the image of the crucifixion.

== Background ==
The German painter and draughtsman Hugo Höppener (1868 – 1948) studied at the Academy of Fine Arts in Munich from 1887, quickly took interest in the Lebensreform (transl. life reform) movement and became a disciple of the artist and social reformer Karl Wilhelm Diefenbach. Diefenbach gave him the name Fidus which is Latin for "the faithful one". Together with two other artists, they briefly lived in a naturist commune, inspired by Heinrich Pudor's theories about nudity as a means for increased harmony, honesty and simplicity. Fidus adopted a Theosophical worldview and became a member of Munich's Theosophical society in 1898.

As a painter, Fidus had the ambition to revitalize society and he described himself as a "man of revelation" (German: Offenbahrungsmensch). He employed Romantic and Germanic subjects in a style influenced by symbolism and Jugendstil to create utopian and völkisch images. He incorporated Lebensreform themes, notably nudism and naturism. Related to the Lebensreform concept were the German Youth Movement and Wandervogel groups, where light, fire and the summer solstice frequently were associated with closeness to nature and vitality, and regarded as important in the search for a new sacrality.

== Subject and composition ==
In Light Prayer, a naked young man with a slim body is seen half from behind. He stands on a rock with his heels raised, facing the sky with his arms stretched out. The wind blazes in his blond hair. The background consists of a blue sky with clouds that appear to go down below the level of the rock.

The view from the back allows viewers to identify with the figure and the nudity provides a timeless element. The man assumes a body position reminiscent of the z-rune, Algiz (ᛉ), which the völkisch occultist Guido von List had interpreted as a symbol for life. The sharp rock, reminiscent of the coastal landscape of Norway which Fidus had visited, and the possible reference to runes evoke a Nordic theme.

The historian of religion Carrie B. Dohe says Light Prayer recalls the image of the crucifixion, which shares the Y-shaped body position and connection to a higher power. According to the cultural historian Marina Schuster, the painting is based on an idea of universal animation (German: Allbeseelung) which can be traced to Friedrich Nietzsche's Thus Spoke Zarathustra. The historian Ryan Kurt Johnson says there are influences from Anthroposophy and Theosophy, and an expression of a cult of evolution theory and natural science.

== Versions ==
From 1890 to 1938, Fidus made eleven versions of Light Prayer, creating it in charcoal, oil, watercolour and as lithograph. The name Light Prayer (German: Lichtgebet) was established with the fifth version, made in 1890 or 1891. The earlier versions were titled Zu Gott (transl. To God) and Betender Knabe (transl. Praying lad).

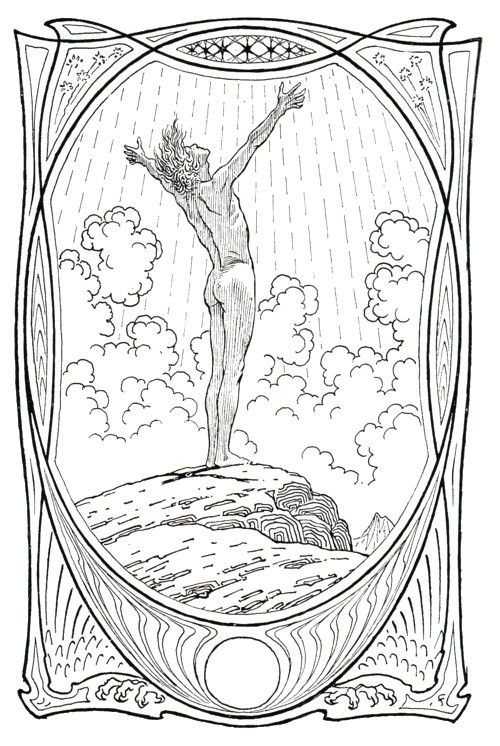
Pen drawing, 1905

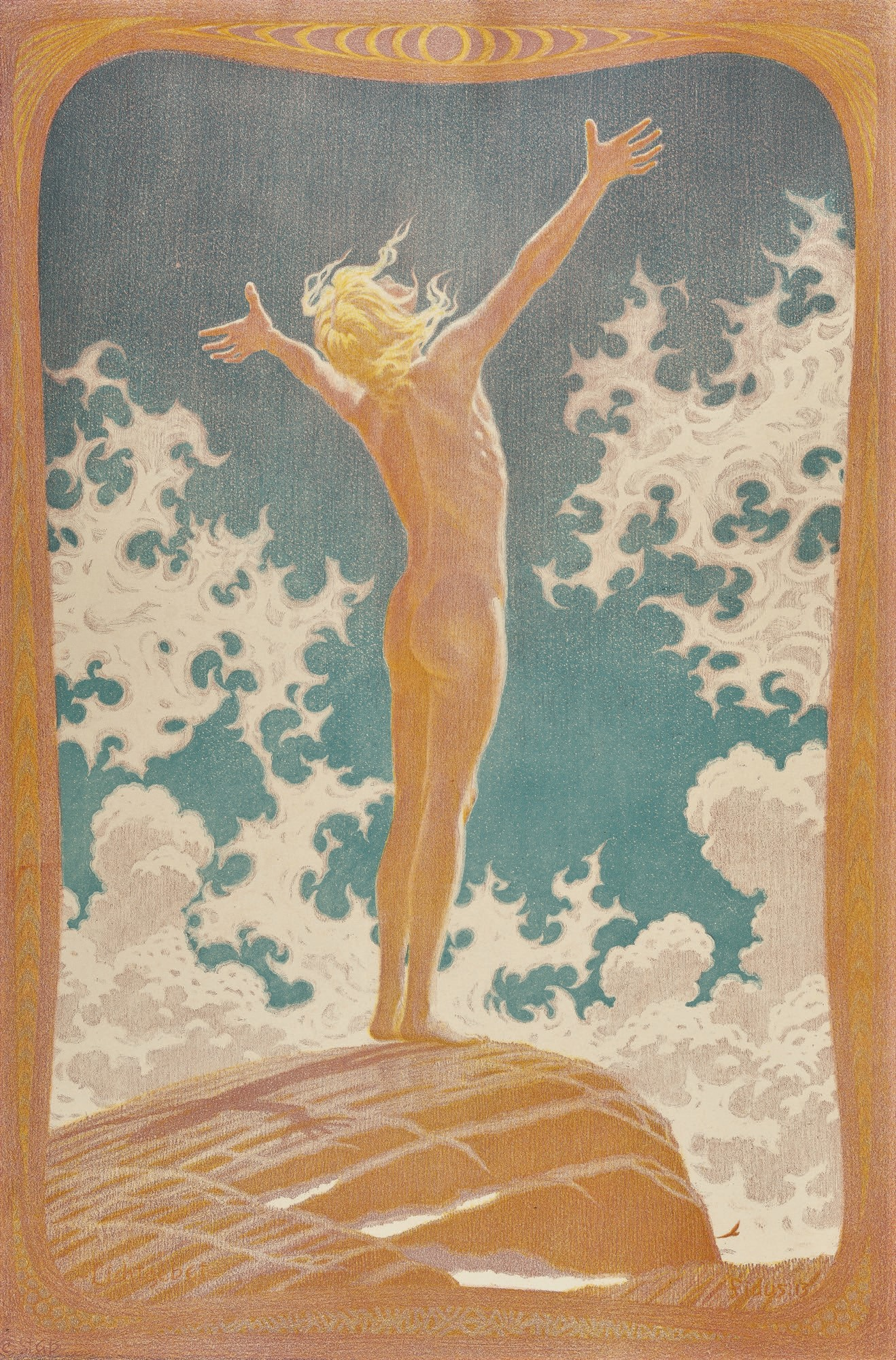
Lithograph, 1913, 63.5 cm × 42.3 cm (25.0 in × 16.7 in)

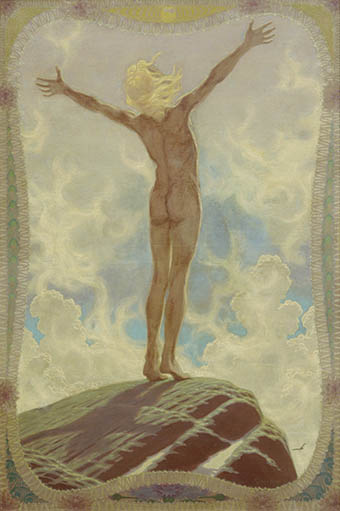
Painting on canvas, 1922, Germanisches Nationalmuseum

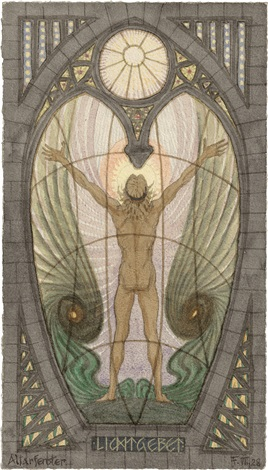
Watercolour over ink and pencil, 1928, design for altar window, The Jack Daulton Collection, Los Altos Hills, California 25.2 cm × 14.4 cm (9.9 in × 5.7 in)

== Reception and legacy ==
Light Prayer became the most emblematic image of the German Youth Movement and a popular image among Germany's urban middle class in the early 20th century. It was widely spread as a postcard, created by Fidus for the Free German Youth Day, held at the Hoher Meißner on 11–12 October 1913. The cultural historian Robbert-Jan Adriaansen describes it as "perhaps the best visualization of the way light was turned into a cult of the unity of body and soul". Jonas Krumbein of Der Tagesspiegel says it encompasses all themes of the Youth Movement's desire to return to nature in reaction to industrialization: "hope for salvation, redemption and departure, ascetic celebration of nudity and beauty, of health, strength and will". Within the Youth Movement, it was especially popular among girls. It is in accordance with the programme formulated for the Free German Youth Day, which promoted resoluteness and a striving for the infinite, but especially younger admirers often viewed it as an image of a young man enjoying himself, without a particular ideological connotation.

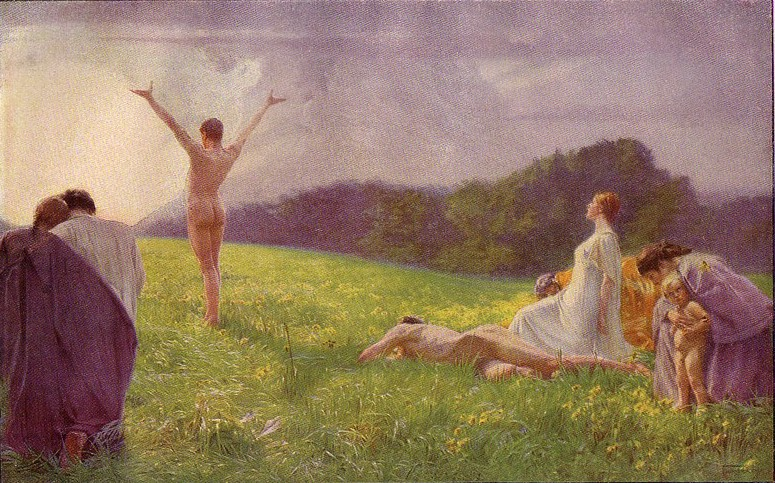
The Holy Hour by Ludwig Fahrenkrog

Light Prayer was popular among Germans who believed in racial souls and wanted to replace conventional Christianity with a Germanic-themed religion. The painter Ludwig Fahrenkrog made his own version of the light prayer motif in 1918, titled The Holy Hour (German: Die heilige Stunde). Fahrenkrog was the founder and leader of the Germanic Faith Community, a neopagan group which Fidus joined in 1908. Fidus became a member of the Nazi Party in 1932, although his paintings were not popular among Nazi leaders, who regarded them as too kitschy. Light Prayer and Fidus' other images of young, nude men in nature were well received among homosexual men, such as the writers of Adolf Brand's magazine Der Eigene.

In 1923, the analytical psychologist Beatrice M. Hinkle published an image reminiscent of Light Prayer in her book Recreating the Individual. This image was drawn by a female patient and Hinkle interpreted it as archaic and a part of the collective unconscious. The historian of medicine Richard Noll says the patient was most likely influenced by Fidus' image.

== See also ==
- Esotericism in Germany and Austria
- Freikörperkultur
- Theosophy and visual arts
