= Der Eigene =

German gay journal (1896–1932)

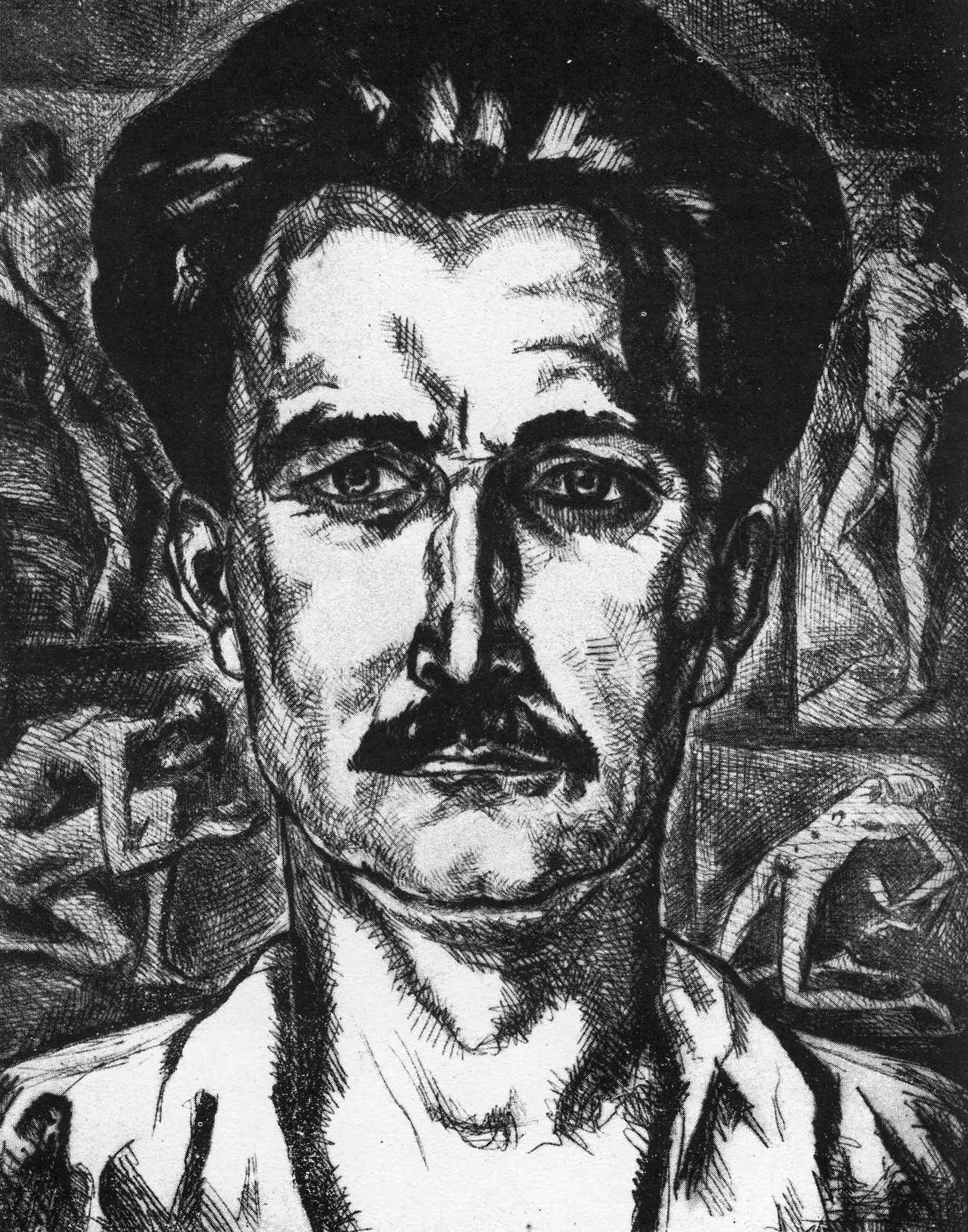
Adolf Brand in a 1924 engraving

Der Eigene ([deːɐ̯ ˈʔaɪ̯ɡənə], lit. 'The Own') was an anarchist newspaper notable for being the first gay journal in the world, published from 1896 to 1932 by Adolf Brand in Berlin. Brand contributed many poems and articles; other contributors included writers Benedict Friedlaender, Hanns Heinz Ewers, Erich Mühsam, Kurt Hiller, Ernst Burchard, John Henry Mackay, Theodor Lessing, Klaus Mann, and Thomas Mann, as well as artists Wilhelm von Gloeden, Fidus, and Sascha Schneider. The journal may have had an average of around 1500 subscribers per issue during its run, but the exact numbers are uncertain.

== History ==
The title of the journal, Der Eigene (no exact English equivalent but has been translated as The Self-Possessed), refers to the classic anarchist work Der Einzige und sein Eigentum (1844) by Max Stirner. Early issues reflected the philosophy of Stirner, as well as other views on the politics of anarchism. By the second year of its focus, it settled into a focus on homosexuality. In the 1920s the journal shifted to support the liberal democracy of the Weimar Republic and the Social Democratic Party of Germany. Der Eigene interwove cultural, artistic, and political material, including lyric poetry, prose, political manifestos and nude photography.

The publisher of Der Eigene had to fight against government censorship, particularly in retaliation against its depictions of nude figures. Brand's home was searched by the police many times. He was arrested for the magazine's provocative content in 1903.

In 1903, the publishing of the poem "Die Freundschaft" (Friendship) by Friedrich Schiller provoked a lawsuit against the magazine, which the magazine won.

The formation of the advocacy group Gemeinschaft der Eigenen allowed Brand to evade censorship by categorizing Der Eigene as a manuscript issued privately to subscribers rather than as a publicly sold magazine. The number of subscribers is estimated at 1500 or fewer.

In 1933, when Adolf Hitler rose to power, Adolf Brand's house was searched and all the materials needed to produce the magazine were seized and given to Ernst Röhm.

In 2020, the Humboldt University of Berlin made the complete set of the magazine available on its website, with censorship in form of pixelation applied to several pages containing artistic photographs and paintings.

== Gallery ==
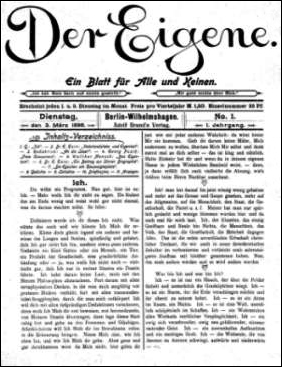
Der Eigene, vol. 1 (1896), no. 1 - ten issues in this format - an anarchist journal with no gay content in this volume

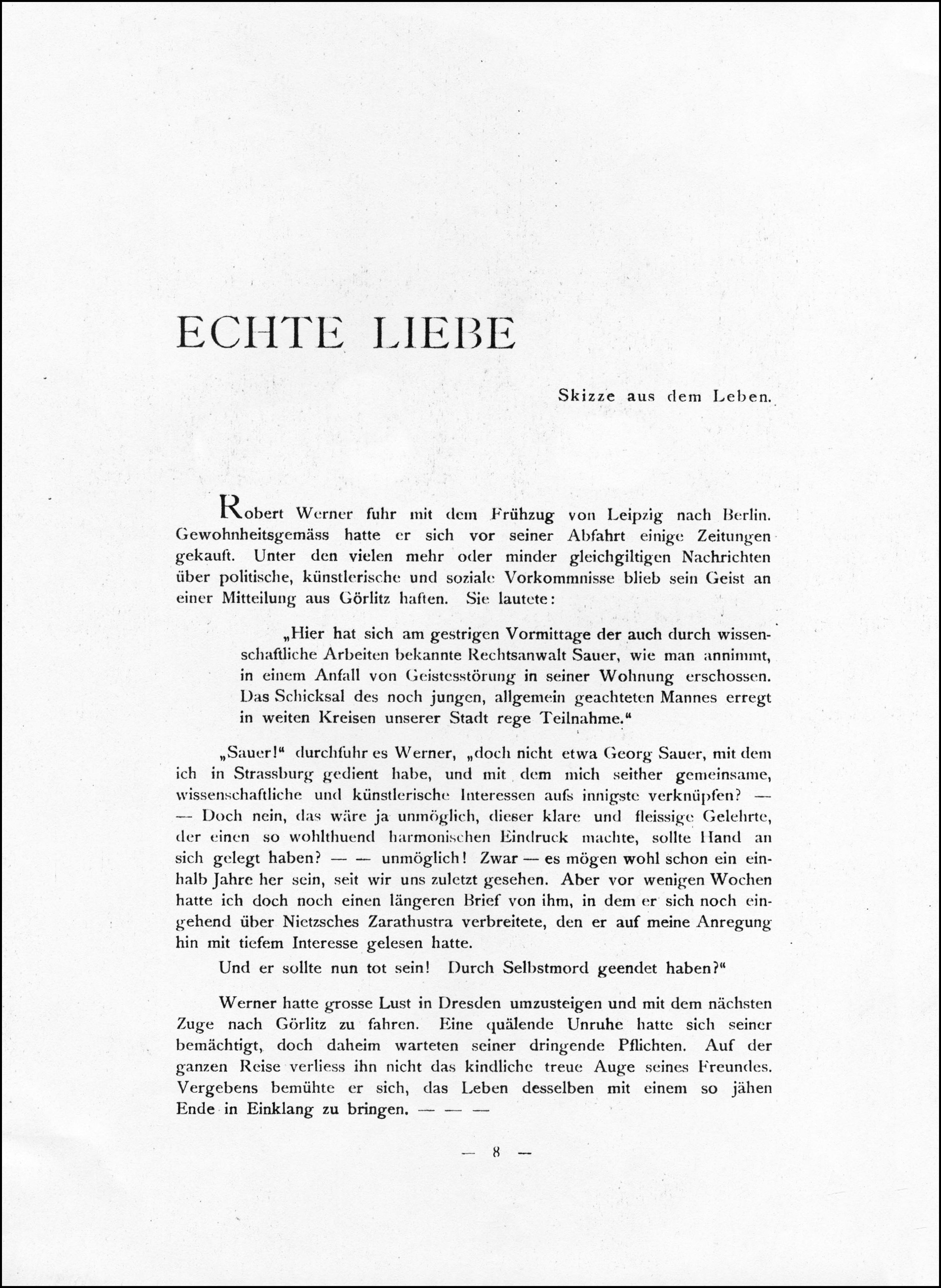
Der Eigene, vol. 2 (1898), no. 1 - two issues in this format - here, the opening page of a gay short story, the journal's first gay text

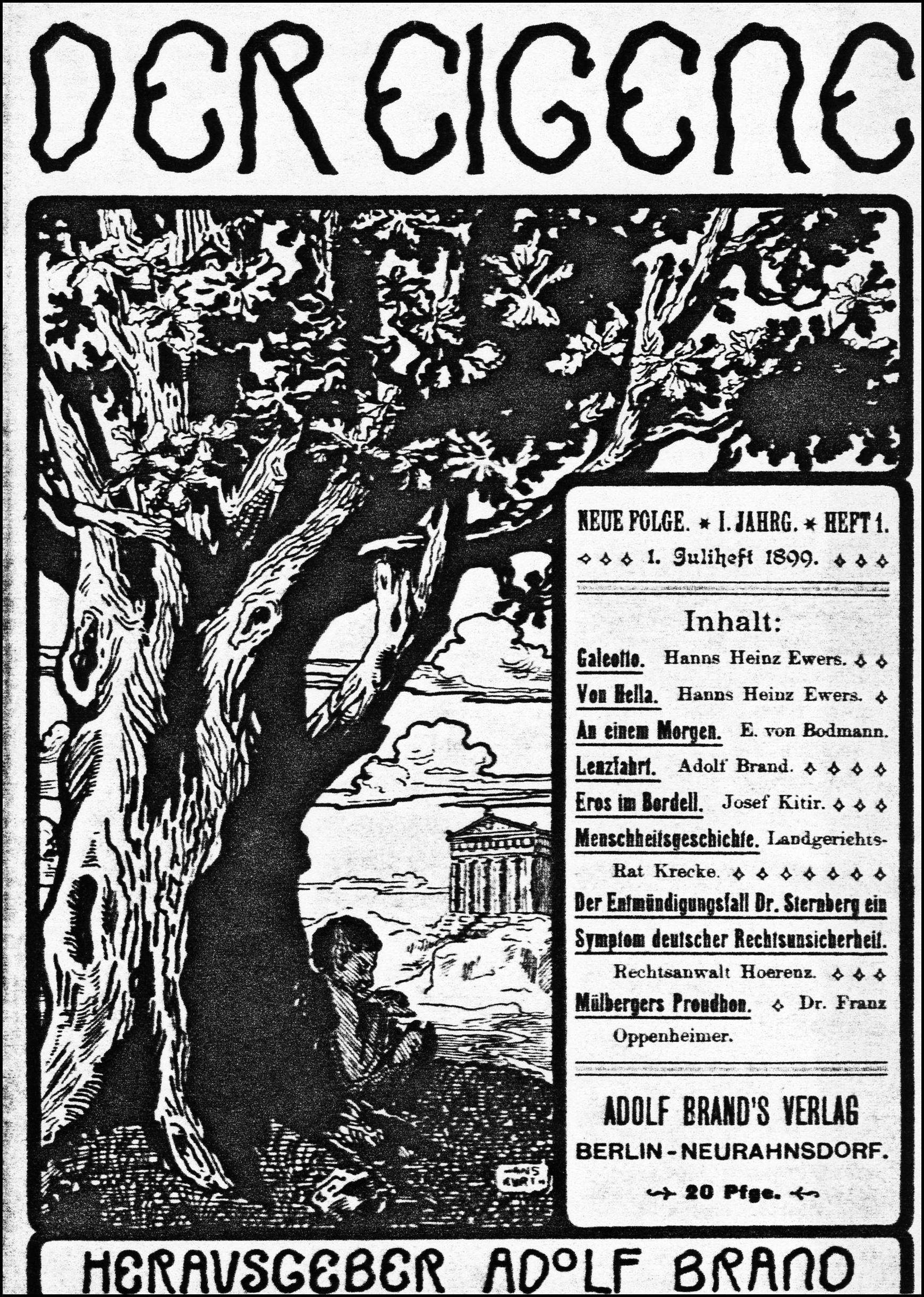
Der Eigene, "New Series" vol. 1 (= vol. 3, the first entirely gay volume) (1898), no. 1 - ten issues in this format

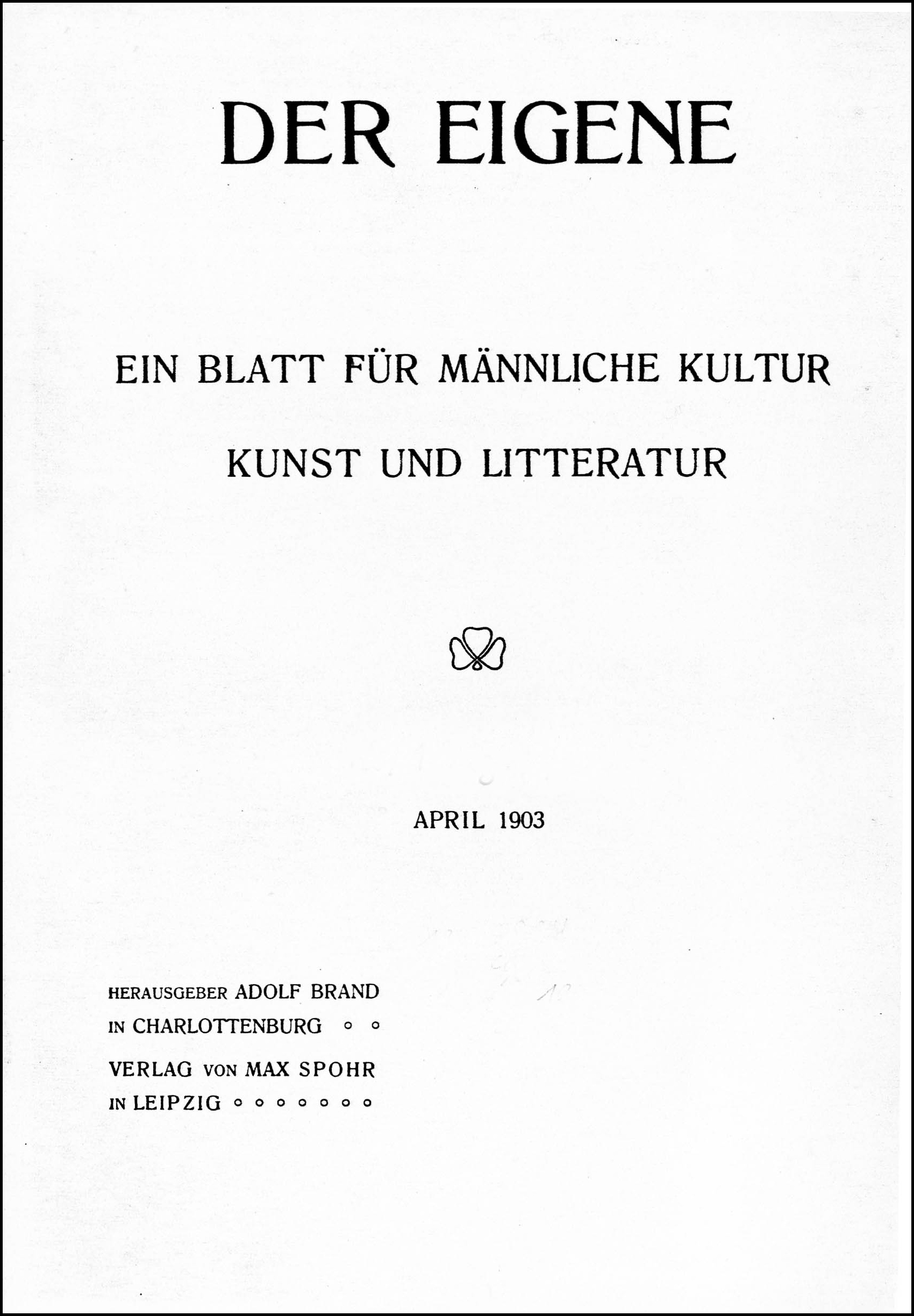
Der Eigene, vol. 4 (or "New Series" vol. 2) (1903), no. 1 - six issues in this format

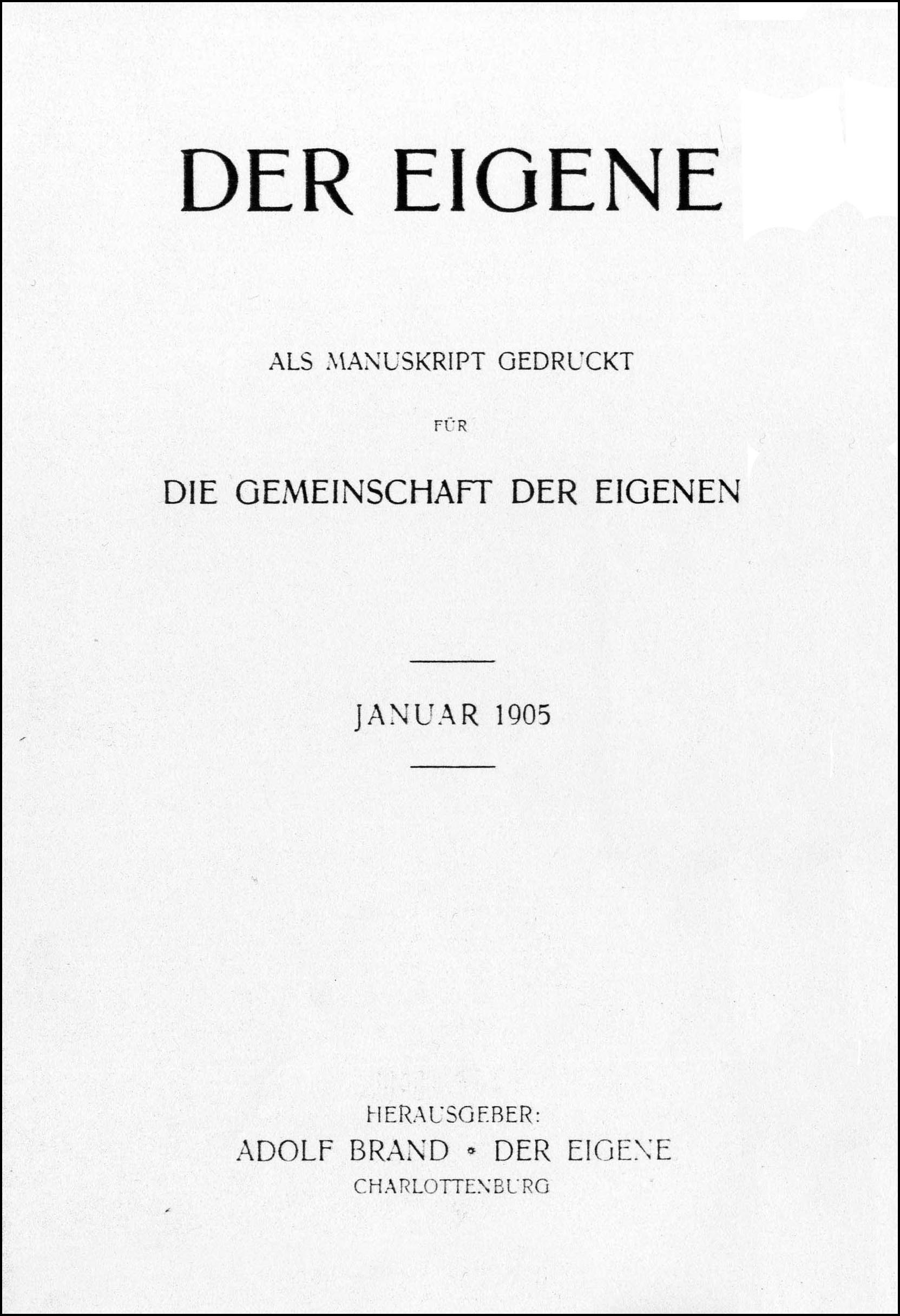
Der Eigene, vol. 5 (or "New Series" vol. 3) (1905), no. 1 - six issues in this format

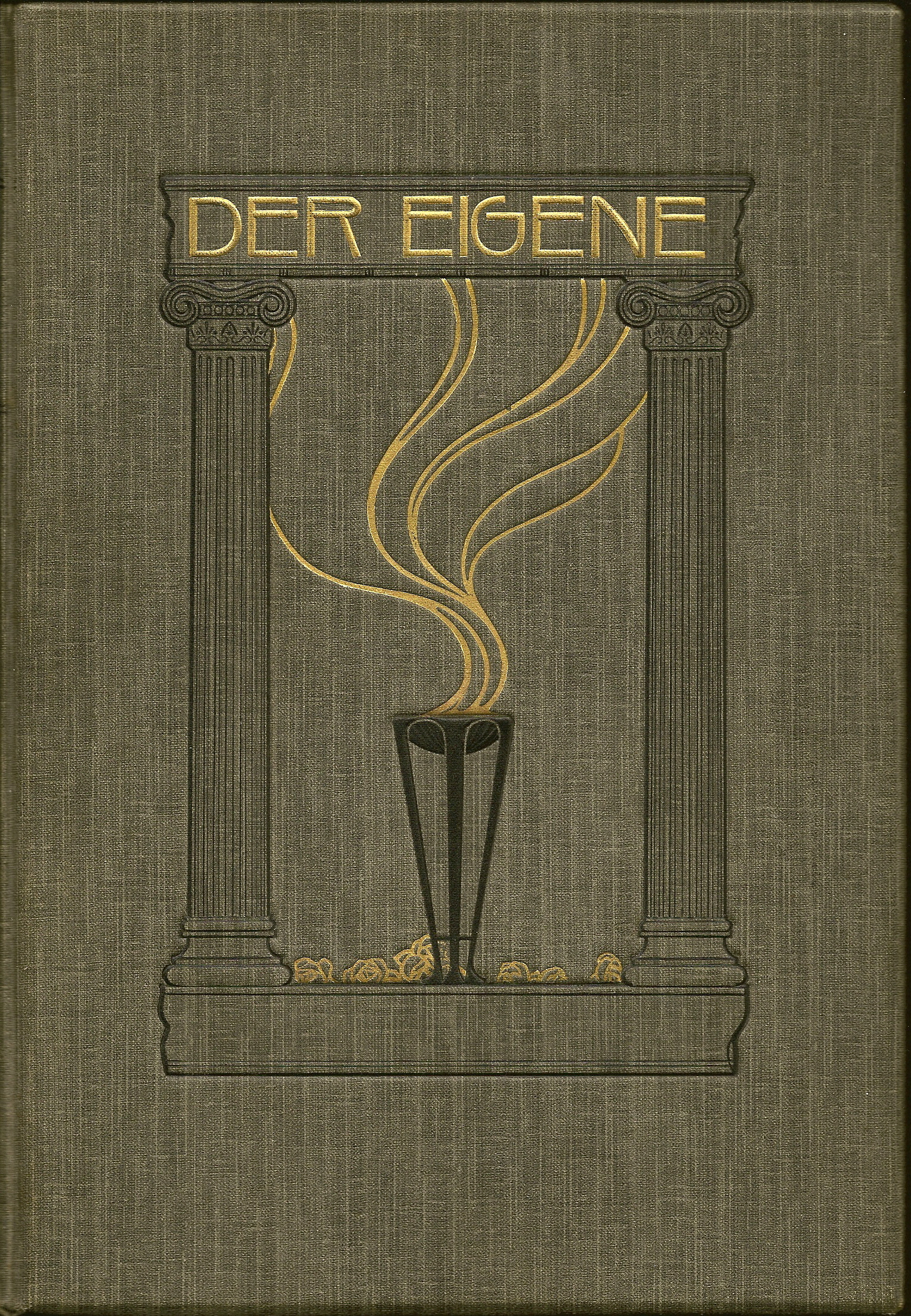
Der Eigene, vol. 6 (1906) - the only hardback issue, an annual

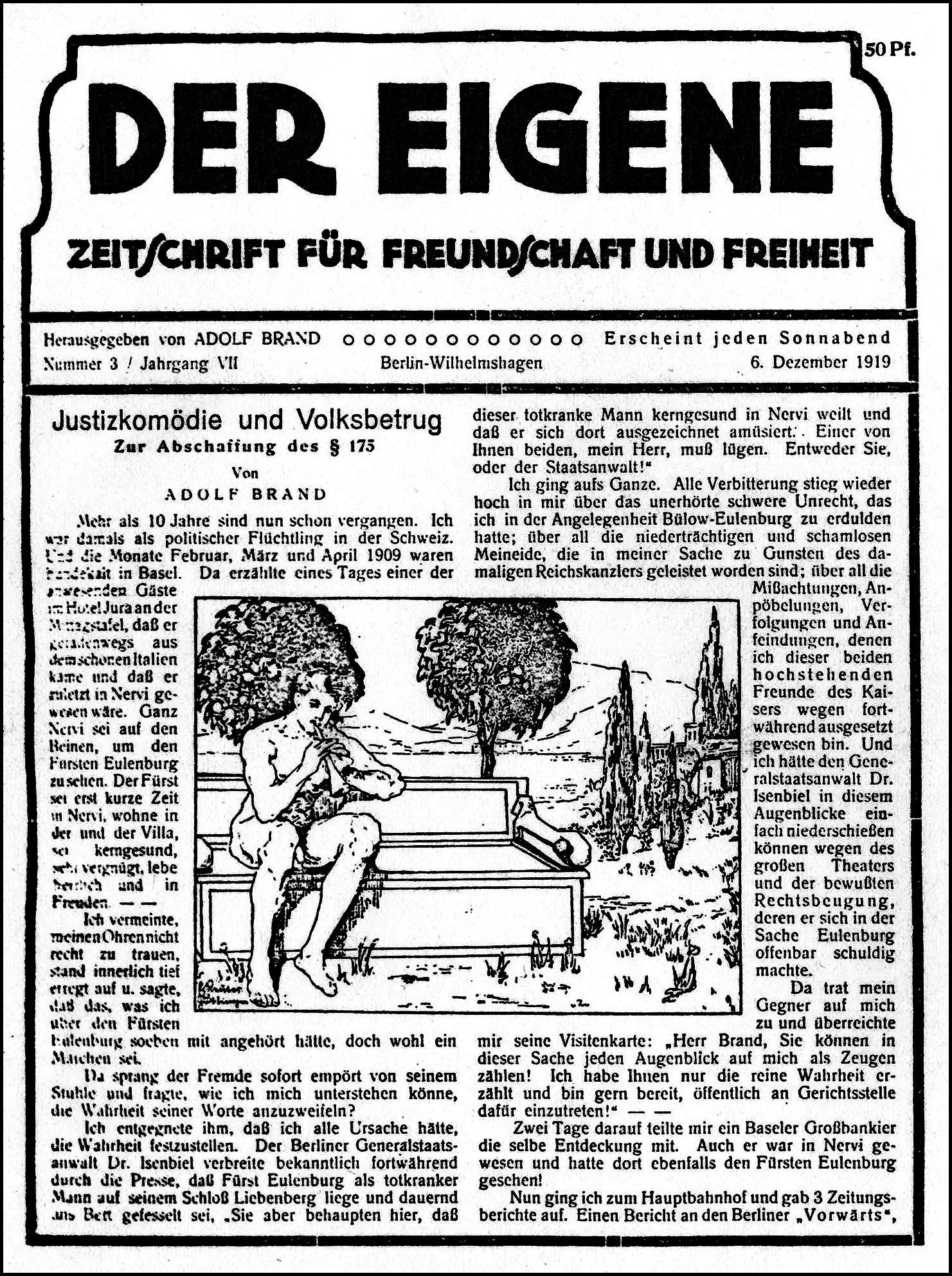
Der Eigene, vol. 7 (1919–20), no. 3 - eleven issues in this format

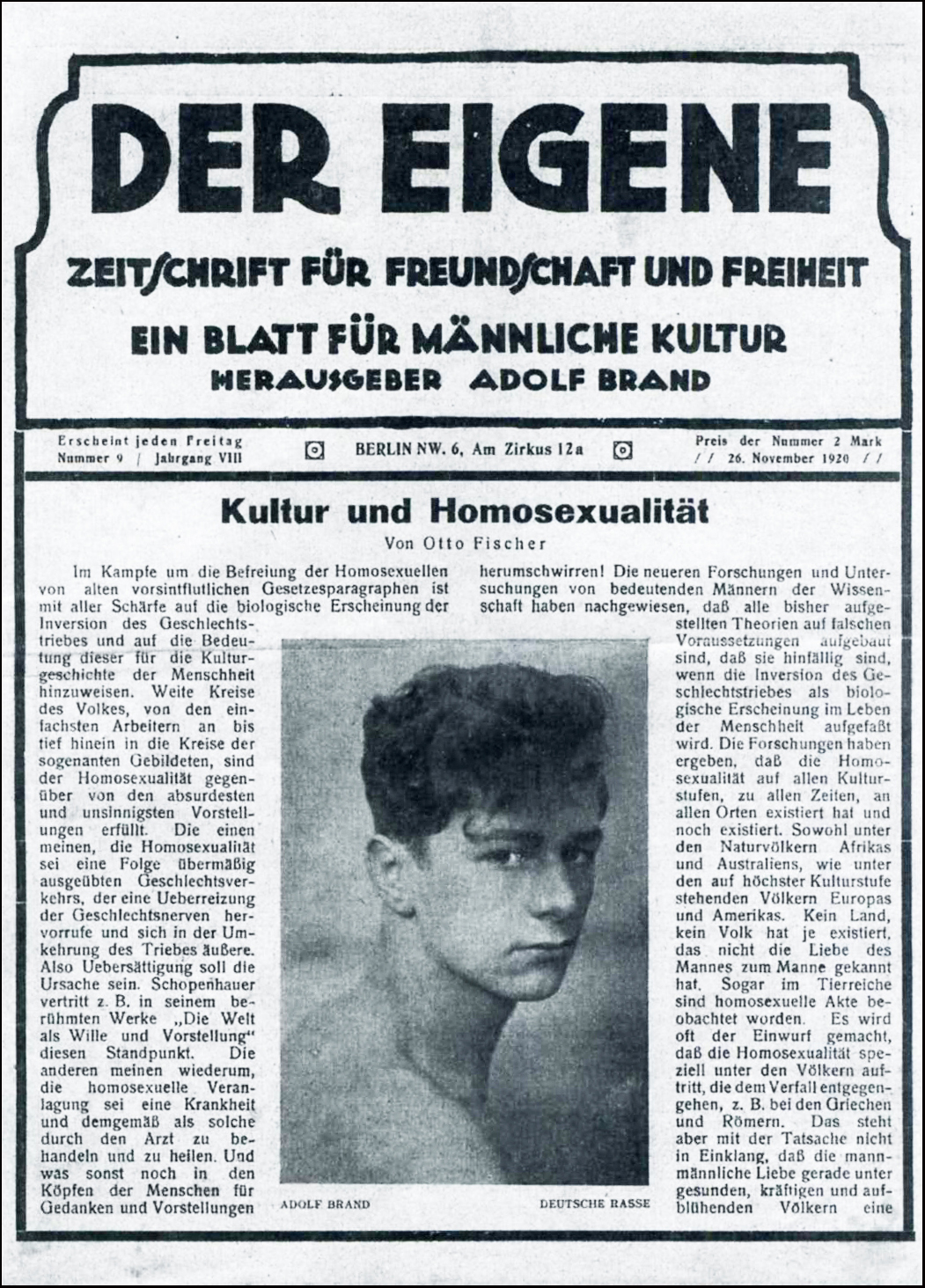
Der Eigene, vol. 8 (1920), no. 9 - fourteen issues in this format

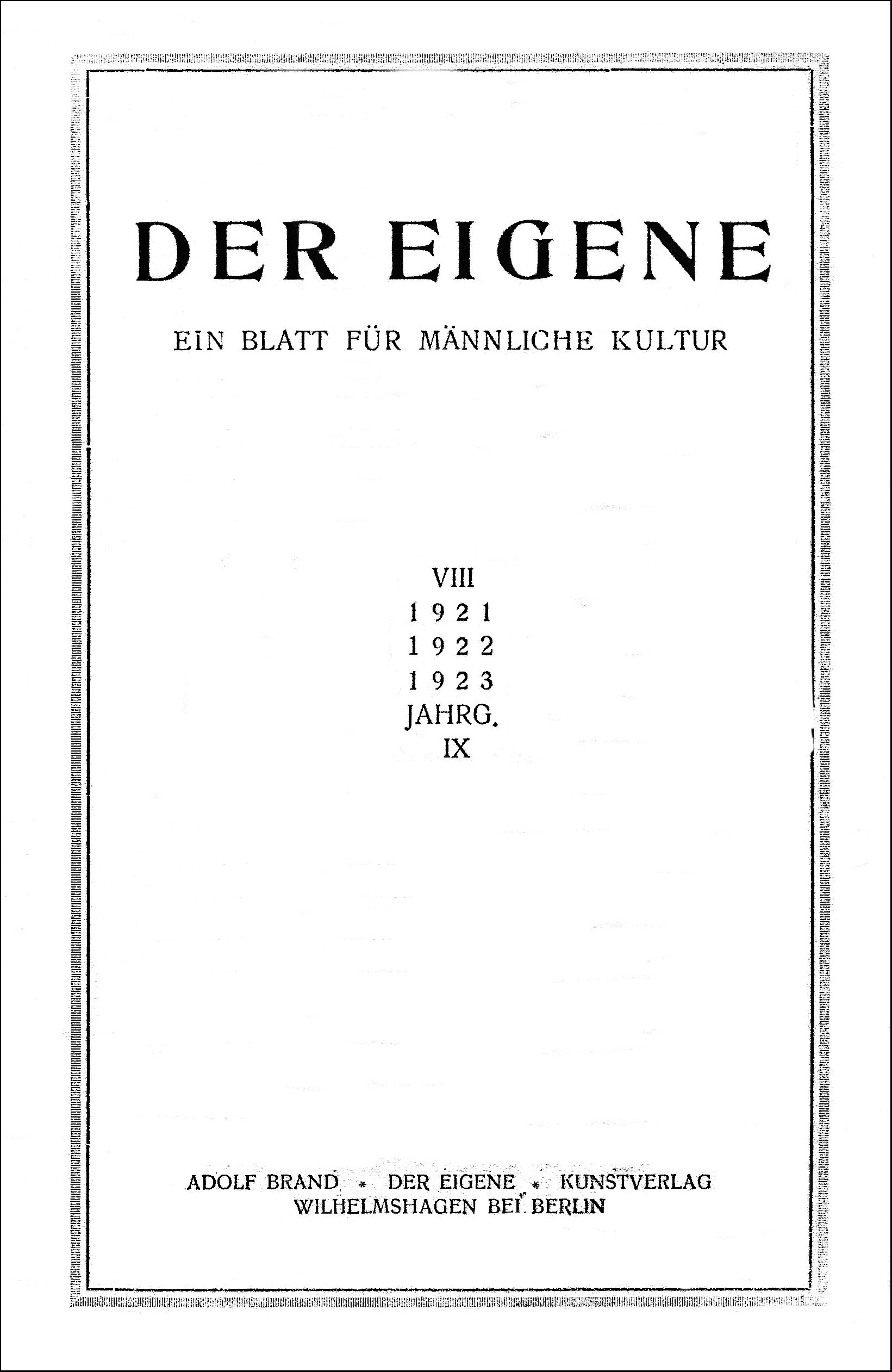
Der Eigene, vol. 9 (1921-22-23), no. 3 - seven issues in this format

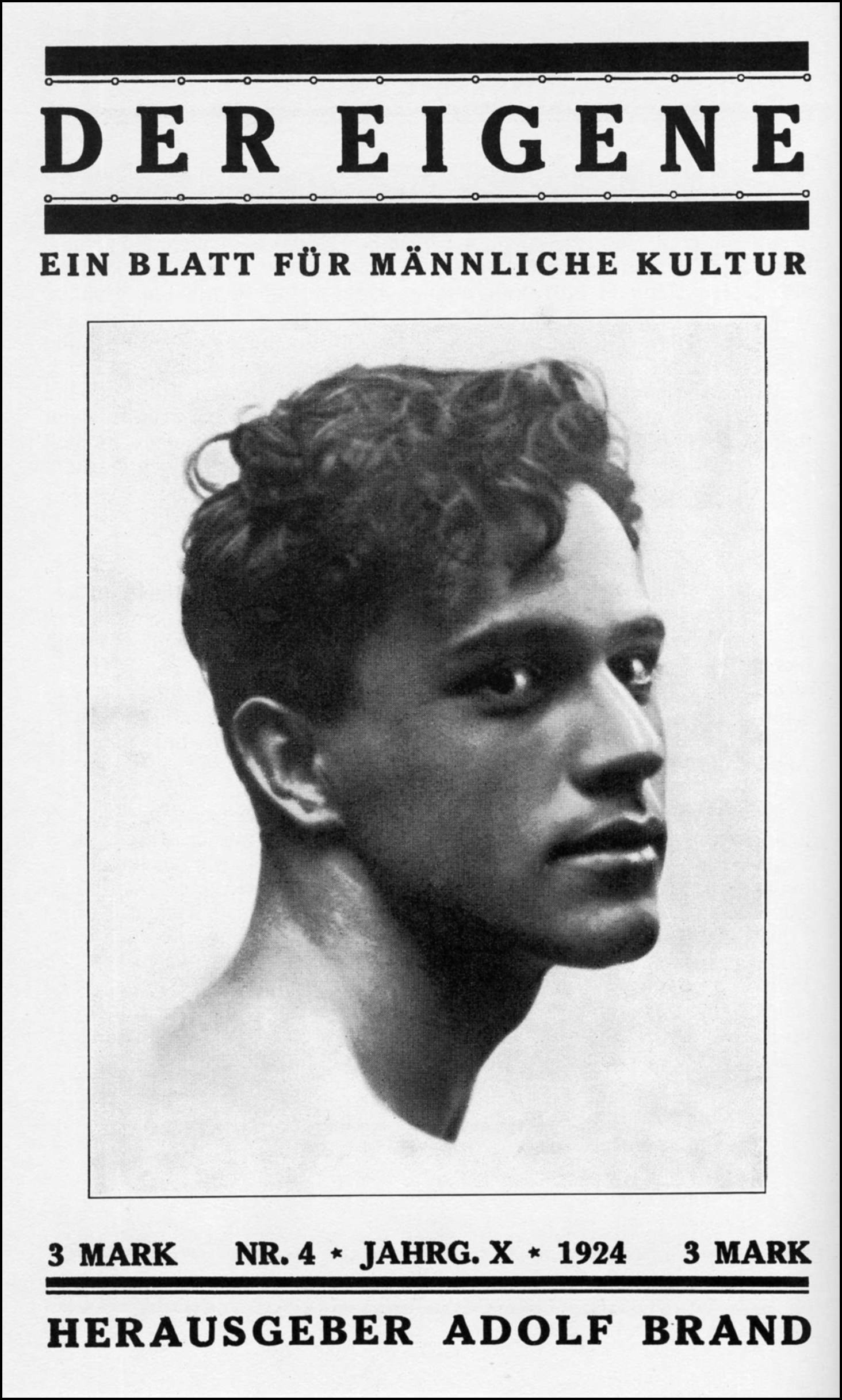
Der Eigene, vol. 10 (1924-25), no. 4 - twelve issues in this format

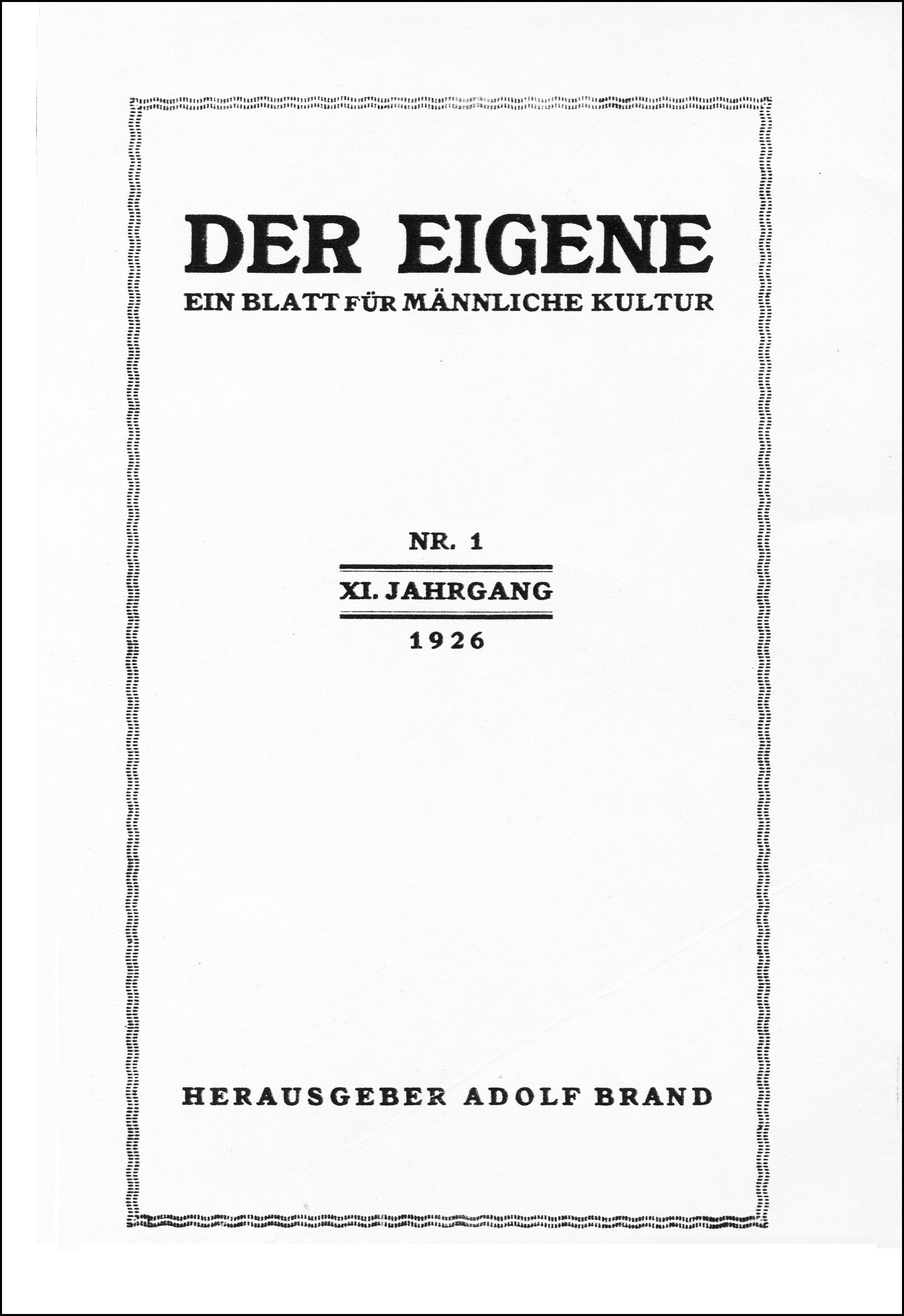
Der Eigene, vol. 11 (1926), no. 1 - ten issues in this format

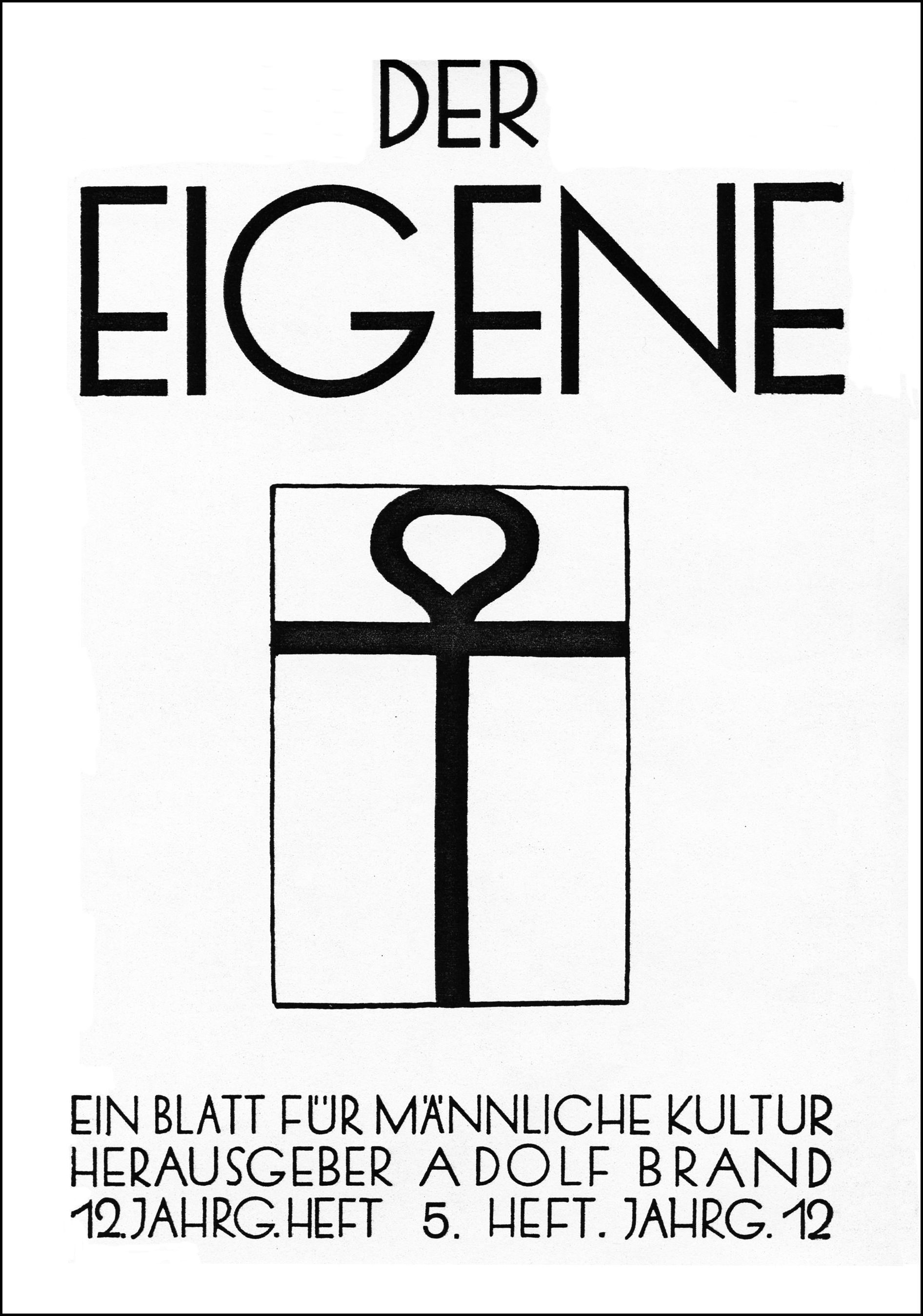
Der Eigene, vol. 12 (1929), no. 5 - five issues in this format

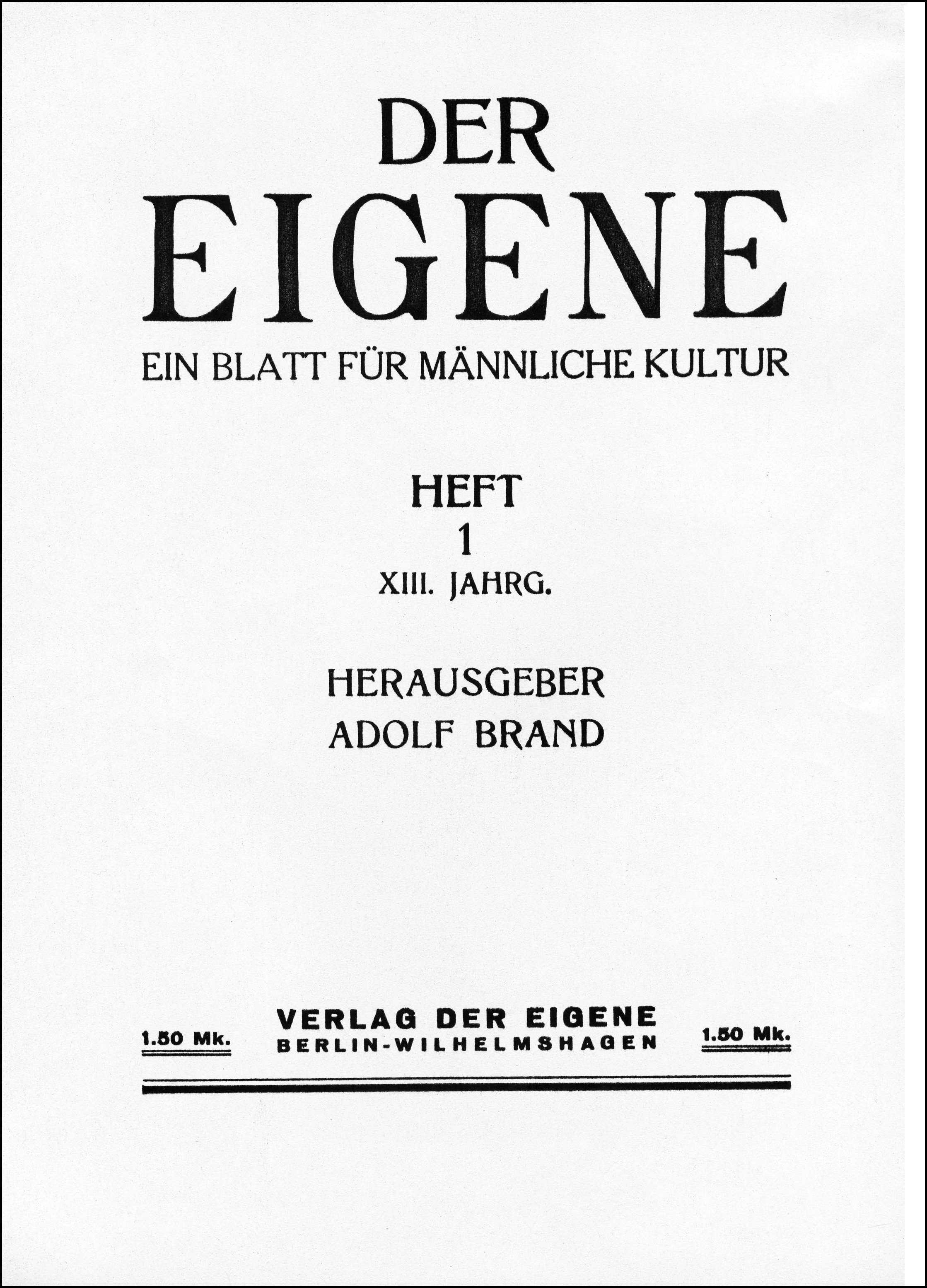
Der Eigene, vol. 13 (1930–32), no. 1 - nine issues in this format

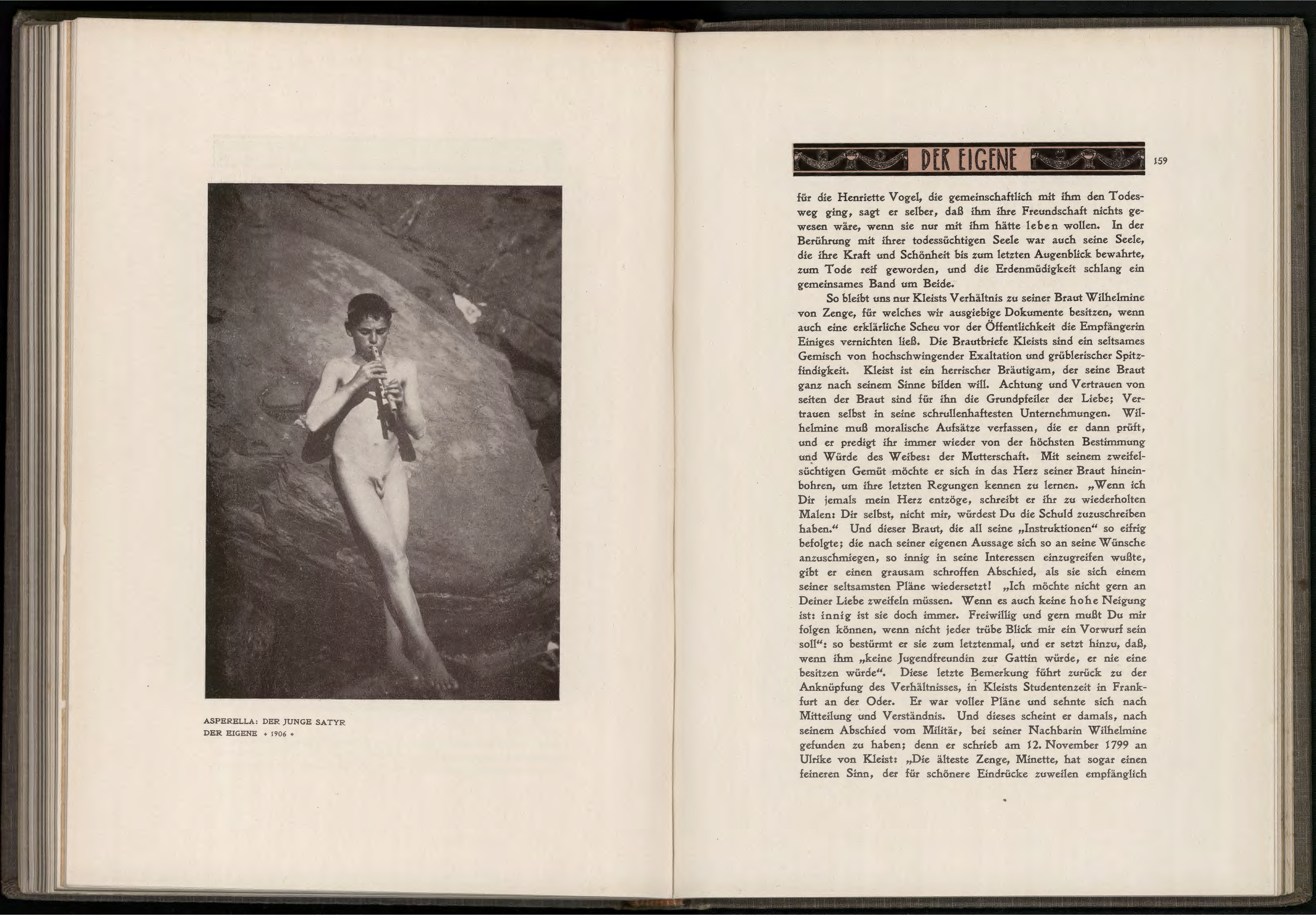
Der Eigene, vol. 6 (1906) - original uncensored page 158

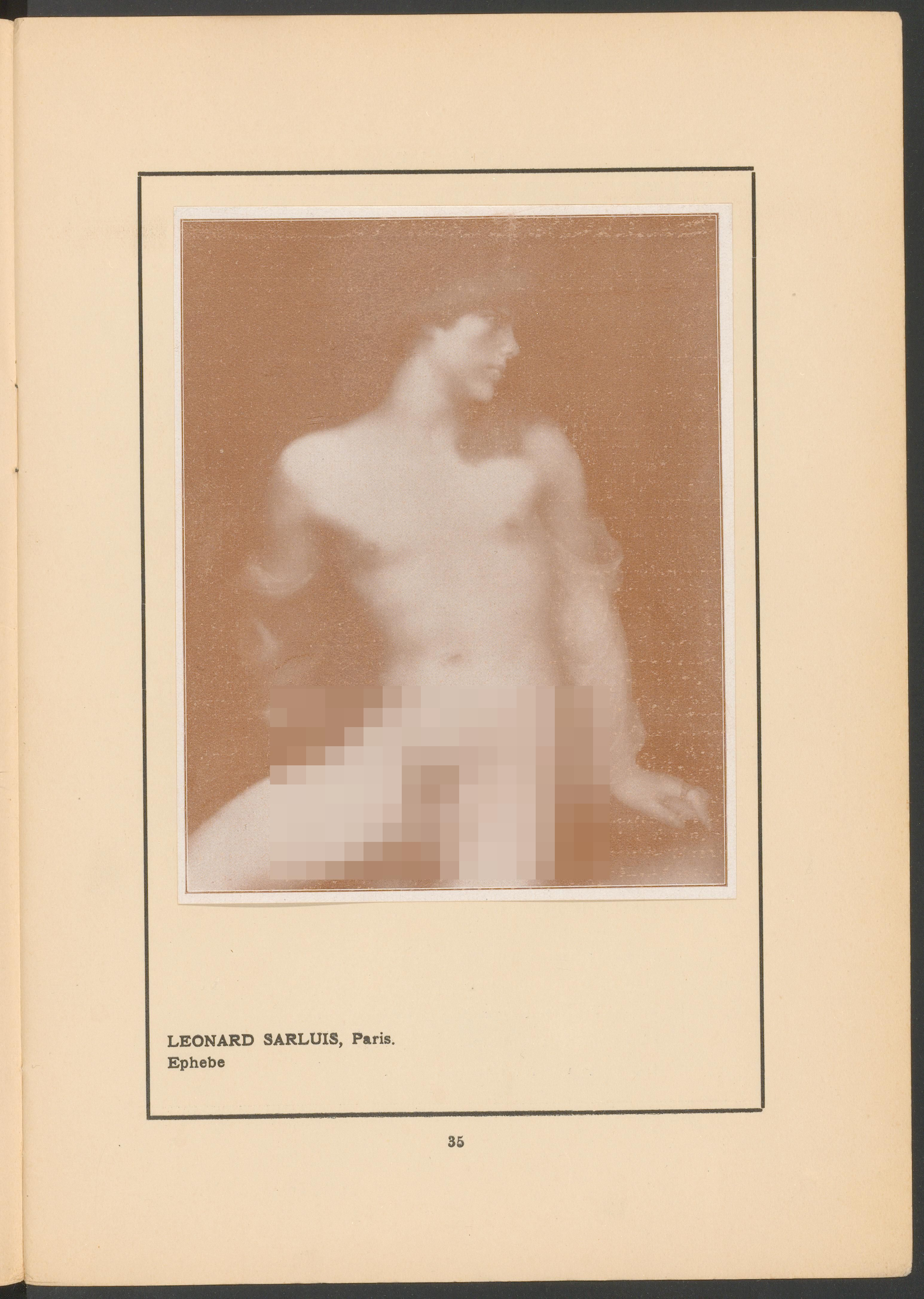
Censored page containing a painting by Léonard Sarluis, from the Humboldt University of Berlin's scan project

== See also ==
- Magnus Hirschfeld
- Adolf Brand
