= Fidushaus =

Property in Woltersdorf, Brandenburg, Germany

Coordinates: 52.4499°N 13.7417°E

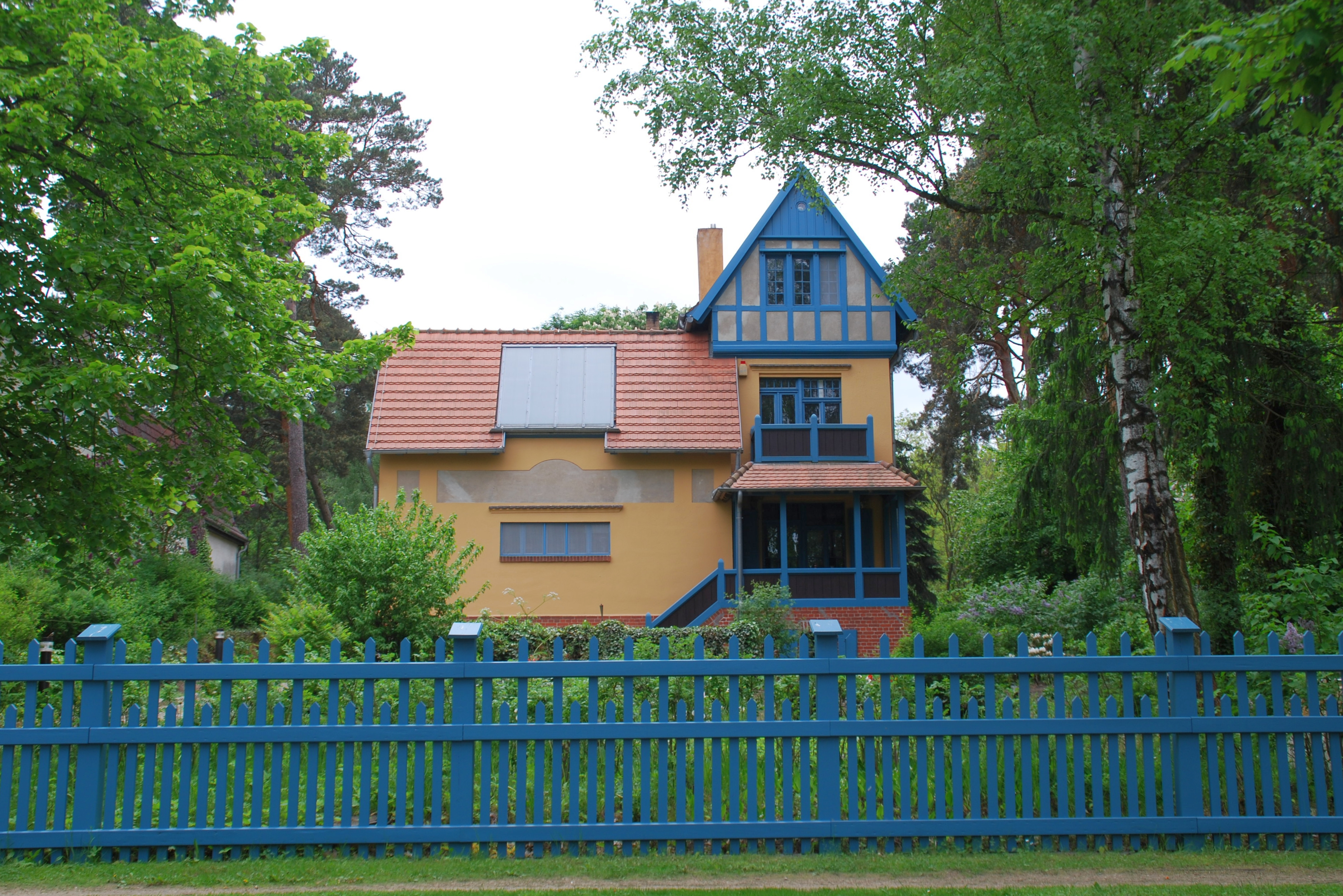
The Fidushaus, photographed in 2010

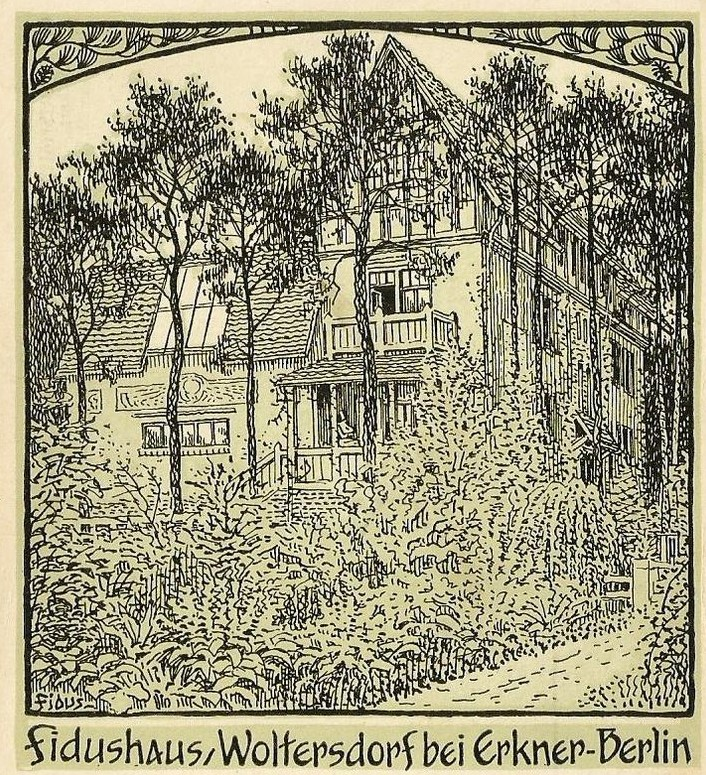
The Fidushaus, as pictured by its owner in 1912

The Fidushaus is a historic house in Brandenburg germany that was once home of the Jugendstil artist Hugo Höppener, better known as Fidus. It is located at Köpenicker Straße 46 in the municipality of Woltersdorf in Brandenburg, Germany, near the capital city of Berlin.

The house is next door to that of the composer Arno Rentsch and his wife Elsa Langer-Howard, who convinced Fidus to move to Woltersdorf.

Fidus used the house to host a variety of völkisch splinter groups, including the St. Georgs-Bund, Wandervogel and other anti-establishment groups.

The building was listed as being of significance in 1977, and the efforts to preserve the building have been awarded the Brandenburg Heritage Conservation Award. There has been some concern about the house attracting far-right tourist attention due to Fidus' membership of the Nazi Party. The Fidushaus has a sophisticated skylight arrangement on its roof. Many artists at one time lived in the area of the house, forming a colony.

As of 2001, the house had been renovated by its owner at a cost of 1.6 million Deutsche Mark (€820,000). There had been several attempts at restoring the Fidushaus and making it into a museum, none of which have been successful.
