= Gemeinschaft der Eigenen =

German homosexual advocacy group

The Gemeinschaft der Eigenen ("Community of Free Spirits") was a German homosexual advocacy group led by anarchist Adolf Brand. The group opposed the country's preeminent advocacy group, Magnus Hirschfeld's Scientific-Humanitarian Committee.

== Founding members ==
In 1903, founding members were the writers Benedict Friedlaender, Peter Hille, Walter Heinrich, Reiffegg, Hanns Fuchs and Martha Marquardt, nobleman Wilhelm Jansen (founder of the Jung-Wandervogel), the painter Fidus, the composer Richard Meienreis and the Dutch painter and physician Lucien von Römer.
