= Race-soul =

Nazi concept of a collective Aryan racial psyche

In Nazi ideology, the race-soul, race soul or racial soul (German: Rassenseele) is a mystical racial psyche greater than any individual member of the German race. The race-soul was variously believed to be the source of such things as justice and poetry; non-Aryan and mixed races were believed to lack these qualities.

== See also ==
- Alfred Rosenberg
- Volksgeist
