= Benedict Friedlaender =

German academic and scientist (1866–1908)

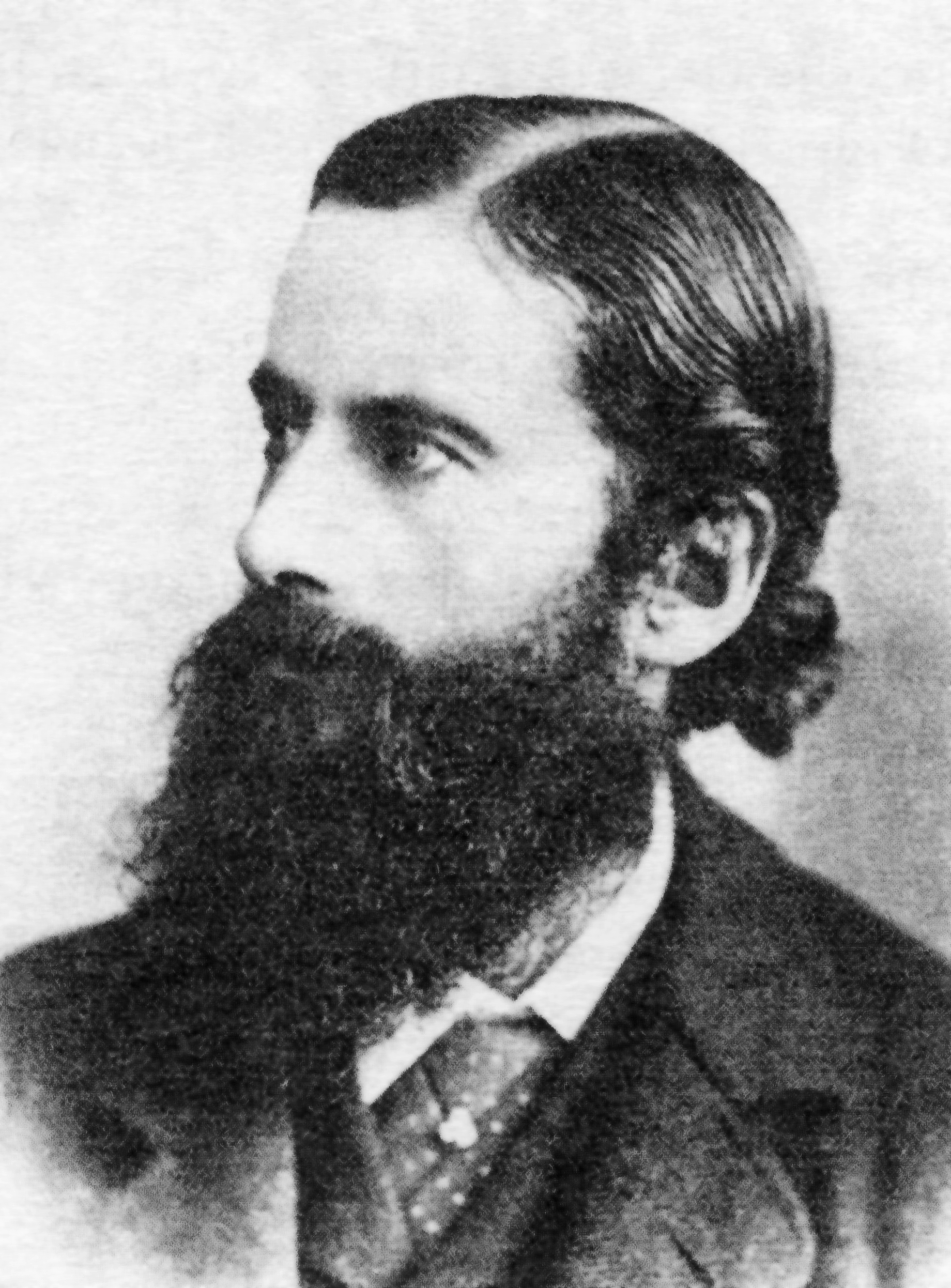
- Friedlaender ca. 1900
- Born: 8 July 1866; Berlin, Kingdom of Prussia
- Died: 21 June 1908 (aged 41); Schöneberg, German Empire
- Occupations: sexologist, sociologist, economist, volcanologist, physicist

Benedict Friedlaender (8 July 1866 – 21 June 1908; first name occasionally spelled Benedikt) was a German Jewish sexologist, sociologist, economist, volcanologist, and physicist.

== Life ==
Friedlaender was born in Berlin as the son of Carl Friedlaender (1817–1876), a professor of economics. His grandfather was Nathan Friedlaender (died 1830), a Berlin physician and university lecturer. Among his siblings was Immanuel Friedlaender (1871–1948), a distinguished volcanologist. He studied mathematics, physics, botany, and physiology in Berlin, earning a Ph.D. in zoology in 1888. As a well-to-do donor, he supported the anarchist journal Kampf and published in the journal Der Sozialist. He gave substantial financial support to Magnus Hirschfeld's Scientific-Humanitarian Committee (Wissenschaftlich-humanitäres Komitee, or WhK) in Berlin. The primary goal of the WhK was to work against Paragraph 175 of the Imperial Penal Code, which criminalized "unnatural vice" between males. The WhK assisted defendants in criminal trials, conducted public lectures, and gathered signatures on a petition for the repeal of the law. It found some parliamentary support for its law reform efforts in the Social Democratic Party.

With Adolf Brand and ten others, Friedlaender founded the homosexual organization called Gemeinschaft der Eigenen (GdE) in 1903. The word Eigenen can mean both "peculiar, distinctive, odd" (as in Oddfellows) and "owned, possessed", and the GdE's name was inspired in part by Max Stirner's libertarian philosophy of "self-ownership" or autonomy. The GdE repudiated Hirschfeld's understanding of homosexuality in a transgender spectrum and instead emphasized the masculinity of male-male sexuality, as did André Gide in 1924 in his Corydon. Some members of the GdE advocated the classical Greek practice of having a relationship with a younger man while being married. The GdE also spurned Hirschfeld's efforts at law reform and coalition-building with the Social Democrats and the feminist movement, adopting instead a diffusely anarchist outlook inspired by Stirner's individualism and the sweeping cultural criticism of Friedrich Nietzsche. Friedlaender nonetheless maintained his membership in the WhK until 1906, when he broke with Hirschfeld and founded a third gay organization named "Secession from the WhK". Later renamed "League for Manly Culture", this organization folded shortly after Friedlaender's death by suicide on 21 June 1908 in Berlin.

Friedlaender wrote several books on different themes. He wrote Die Renaissance des Eros Uranios, which called for the revival of "Greek love".

== Works ==
- Beiträge zur Kenntniss des Centralnervensystems von Lumbricus. Berlin: Dissertation, 1888.
- Der freiheitliche Sozialismus im Gegensatz zum Staatsknechtsthum der Marxisten. Mit besonderer Berücksichtigung der Werke und Schicksale Eugen Dühring's. Berlin: Freie Verlagsanstalt, 1892.
- Absolute oder relative Bewegung?, with Immanuel Friedlaender. Berlin: Leonhard Simion, 1896.
- Der Vulkan Kilauea auf Hawaii. Berlin: H. Paetel, 1896.
- Die vier Hauptrichtungen der modernen socialen Bewegung: Marxistische Socialdemokratie, Anarchismus, Eugen Dührings socialitäres System und Henry Georges Neophysiokratie, kritisch und vergleichend dargestellt. Berlin: Calvary, 1901.
- Marxismus und Anarchismus. Berlin: Calvary, 1901.
- Die Renaissance des Eros Uranios. Die physiologische Freundschaft, ein normaler Grundtrieb des Menschen und eine Frage der männlichen Gesellungsfreiheit. In naturwissenschaftlicher, naturrechtlicher, culturgeschichtlicher und sittenkritischer Beleuchtung. Berlin-Treptow: Bernhard Zack, 1904.
- Entwurf zu einer reizphysiologische Analyse der erotischen Anziehung unter Zugrundlegung vorwiegend homosexuellen Materials. Leipzig: Spohr, 1905.
- Männliche und weibliche Kultur. Eine kausalhistorische Betrachtung. Leipzig: "Deutscher Kampf" Verlag, 1906.
- Die Liebe Platons im Lichte der modernen Biologie. Berlin-Treptow: Bernhard Zack, 1909.

== See also ==
- Anarchism in Germany
- Individualist anarchism in Europe
