= Fidus =

German painter (1868–1948)

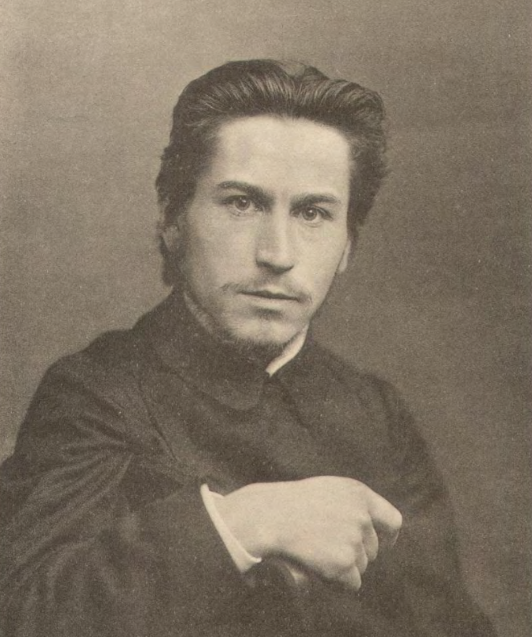
- Photo of Fidus, c. 1902
- Born: Hugo Reinhold Karl Johann Höppener; 8 October 1868; Lübeck, North German Confederation
- Died: 23 February 1948 (aged 79); Woltersdorf, Germany
- Movement: Symbolism

Hugo Reinhold Karl Johann Höppener (8 October 1868 – 23 February 1948), known under the pseudonym Fidus, was a German illustrator, painter, and publisher. Part of the symbolist movement, his later work took influence from the Art Nouveau and Vienna Secession styles. By the turn of the century, his works were among the most popular in Germany and their rediscovery influenced the Psychedelia movement. Much of his art draws from his beliefs in mysticism and Germanic neopaganism.

== Biography ==
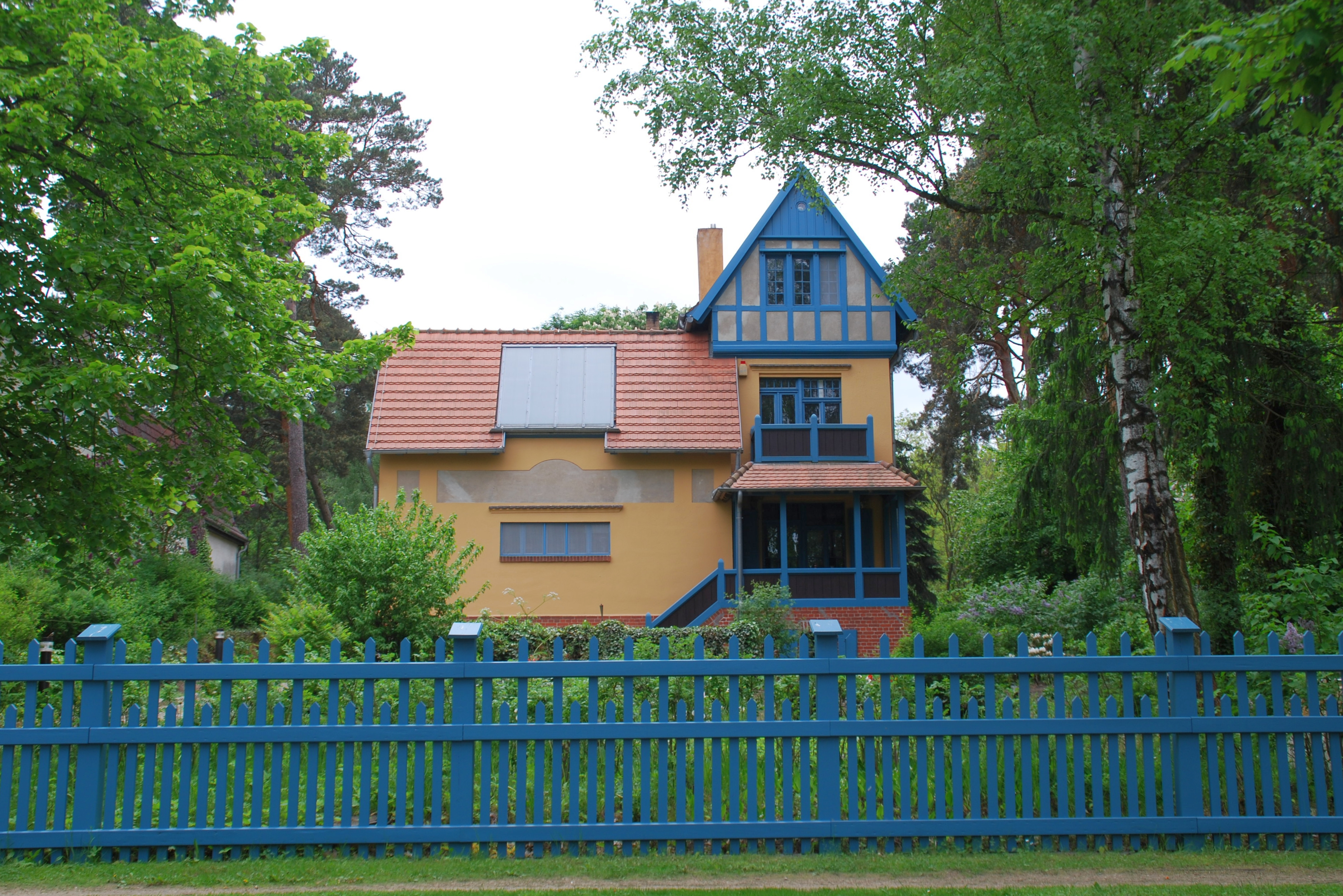
The Fidushaus in Woltersdorf near Berlin. This house was built after designs by Fidus between 1908 and 1910. Today it is a cultural heritage monument.

Born the son of a confectioner in Lübeck, Höppener demonstrated artistic talent at an early age. Around 1886 he met the "apostle of nature" and artist Karl Wilhelm Diefenbach (1851–1913), and joined Diefenbach's commune near Munich. On Diefenbach's behalf, he served a brief prison sentence for public nudity, earning him the name Fidus ("faithful").

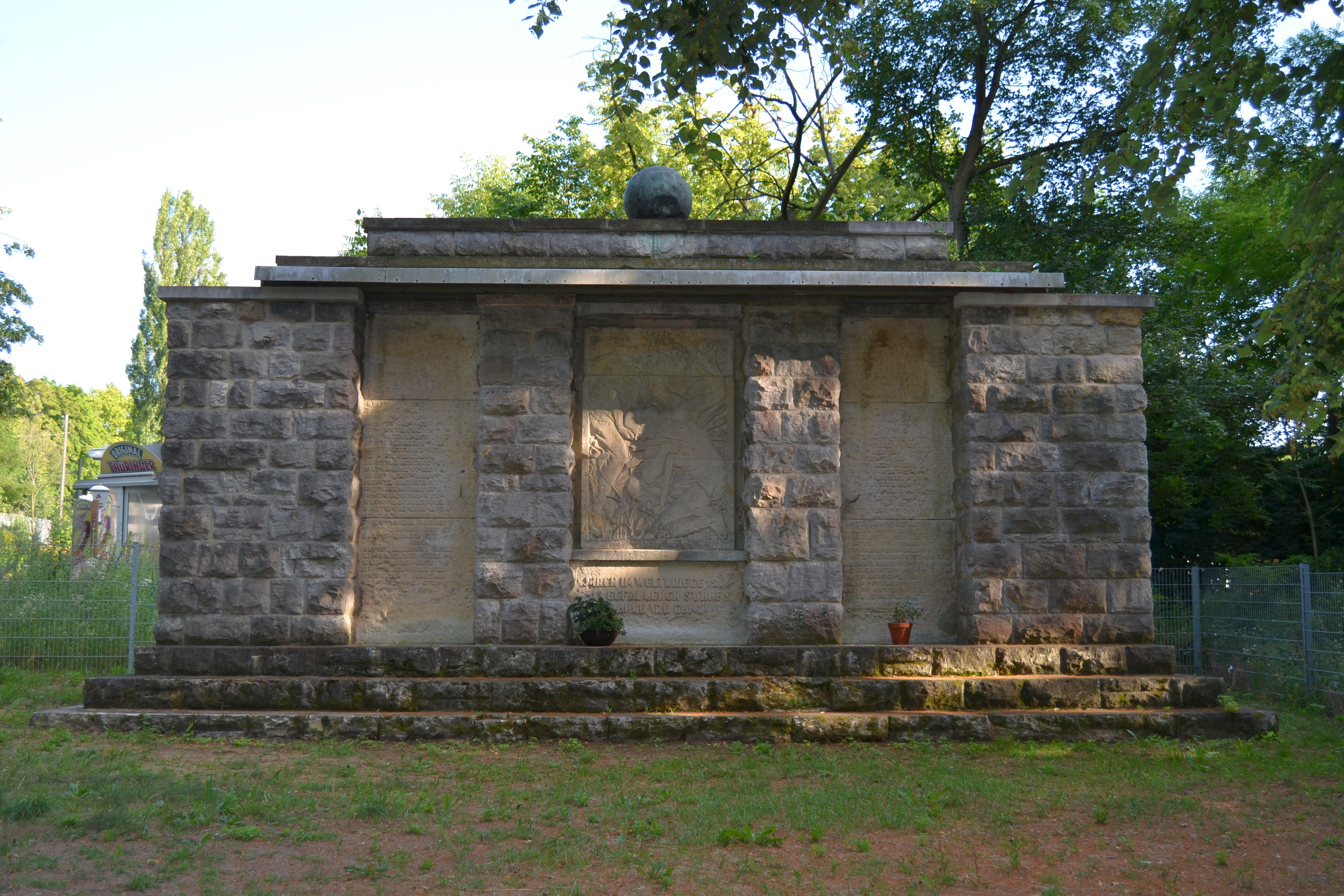
Monument for the killed First World War Soldiers from Woltersdorf, Relief was made by Fidus.

In 1892 he moved to Berlin, set up another commune, and worked as an illustrator on the magazine Sphinx. His work appeared frequently in Jugend and other illustrated magazines. He created many ornamental drawings, especially for book decoration, as well as ex-libris, posters and designs. He was one of the first artists to use advertising postcards to promote his work. He also contributed to the early homosexual magazine Der Eigene, published by Adolf Brand.

He held mystical Theosophical beliefs, and became interested in German mythology. His early illustrations contained dream-like abstractions, while his later work was characterised by motifs such as peasants, warriors, and other naked human figures in natural settings. He often combined mysticism, eroticism, and symbolism, in Art Nouveau and Sezessionist styles. By 1900 he was one of the best known painters in Germany, and had come under the influence of writers such as Arthur Moeller van den Bruck, Heinrich and Julius Hart, and the anti-materialist garden city and Wandervogel movements. His most famous painting is Light Prayer, which he made in eleven versions from 1890 to 1938. In 1908 he joined the Germanic Faith Community, a religious group led by the painter Ludwig Fahrenkrog, which combined Germanic neopaganism with teachings about self-redemption. In 1912 he designed a famous poster for a congress on "biological hygiene" in Hamburg, showing a man in the process of breaking his bonds and rising up to the stars.

Fidus had been introduced to theosophy by Wilhelm Hübbe-Schleiden. He attended the meeting of the theosophists in Berlin in February 1913 where there was a split between the group led by Rudolf Steiner and the original group under Annie Besant. Prior to the meeting, Steiner had cast out many members including Hübbe-Schleiden. Fidus left the Steiner group and stayed with the Annie Besant faction.

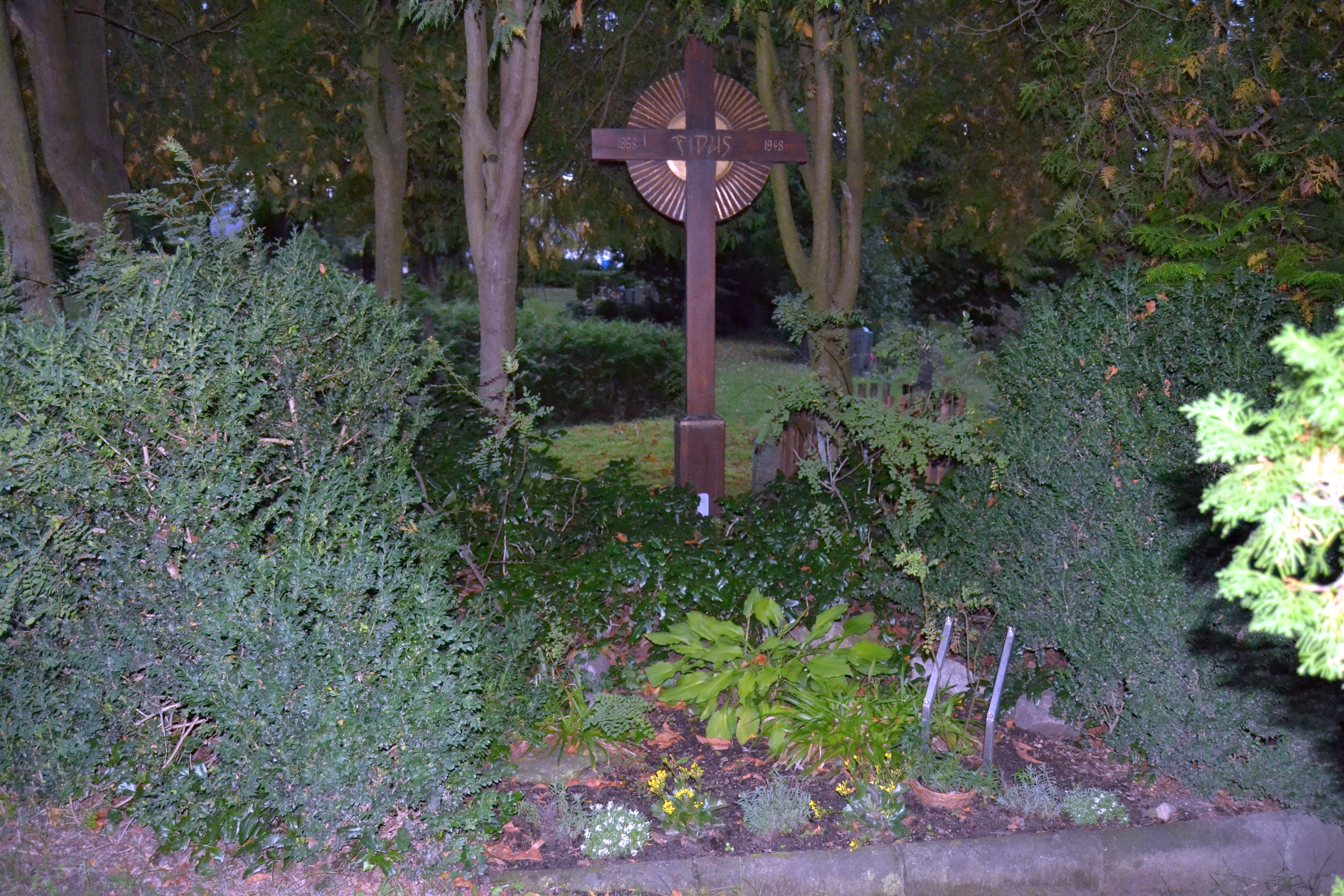
Fidus' Grave at the Woltersdorf cemetery.

After 1918, interest in Fidus' work as an illustrator ebbed. Fidus perceived the blood and soil (Blut und Boden) idea in Nazism to fit with his veneration of nature and the human spirit, so he joined the party in 1932. However, he did not receive the support of the Nazi regime and his works were banned altogether in 1937 for the perceived promotion of esotericism. Fidus renounced his Nazi Party membership and joined the Christian Democratic Union (CDU) party. He died from a stroke in 1948.

== Legacy ==
By the time Fidus died his art had been almost forgotten. It was rediscovered in the 1960s, and directly influenced the psychedelic concert posters which began to be produced at that time, initially in and around San Francisco. There is an archive of Fidus work at the Berlinische Galerie. Another large archive of Fidus materials (including artworks, diaries, correspondence, and photographs) is held by the Jack Daulton Collection in Los Altos Hills, California.

== Gallery ==
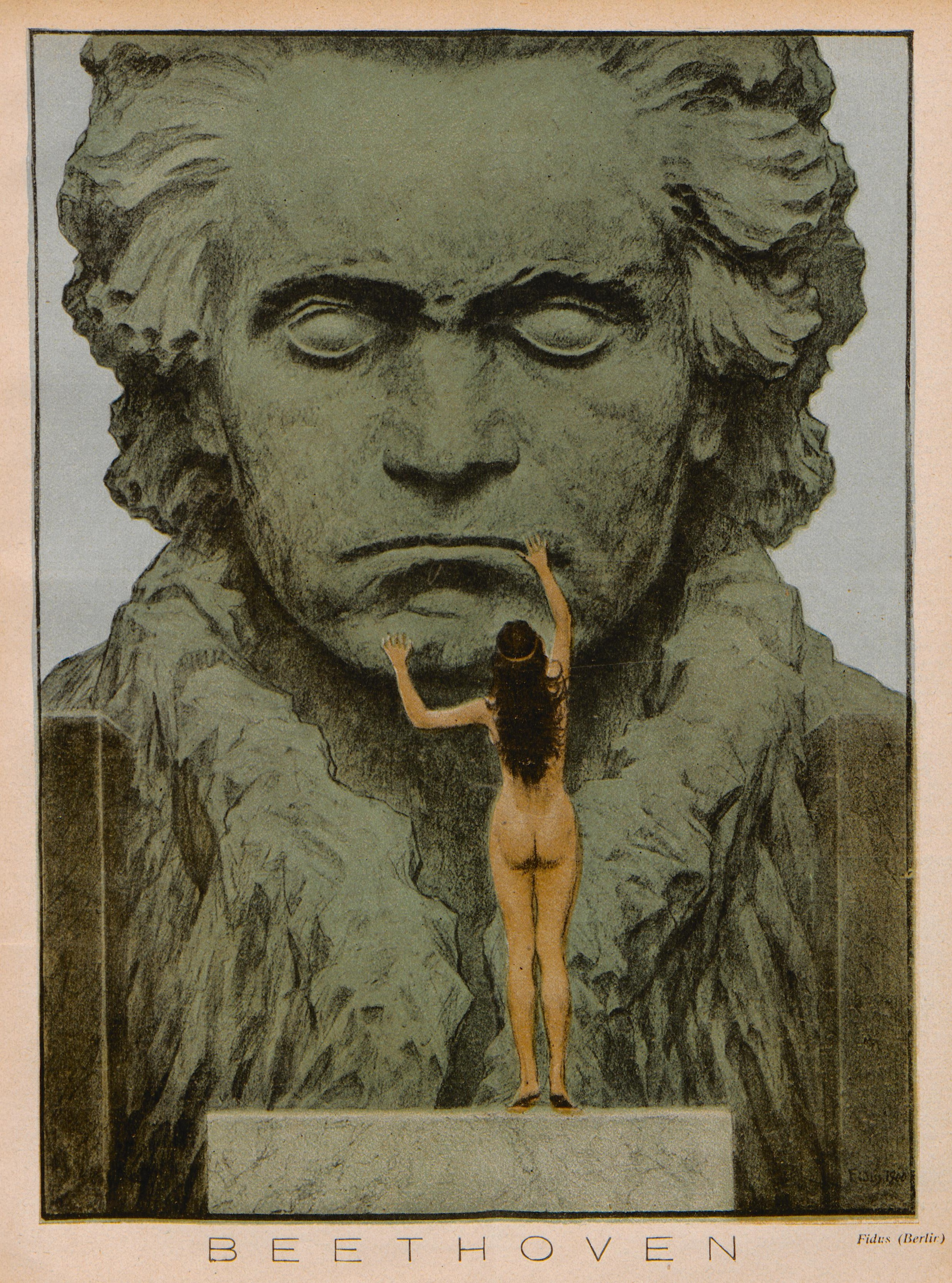
Entwurf für einen Beethoven-Tempel (Design for a Beethoven Temple), illustration, 1903

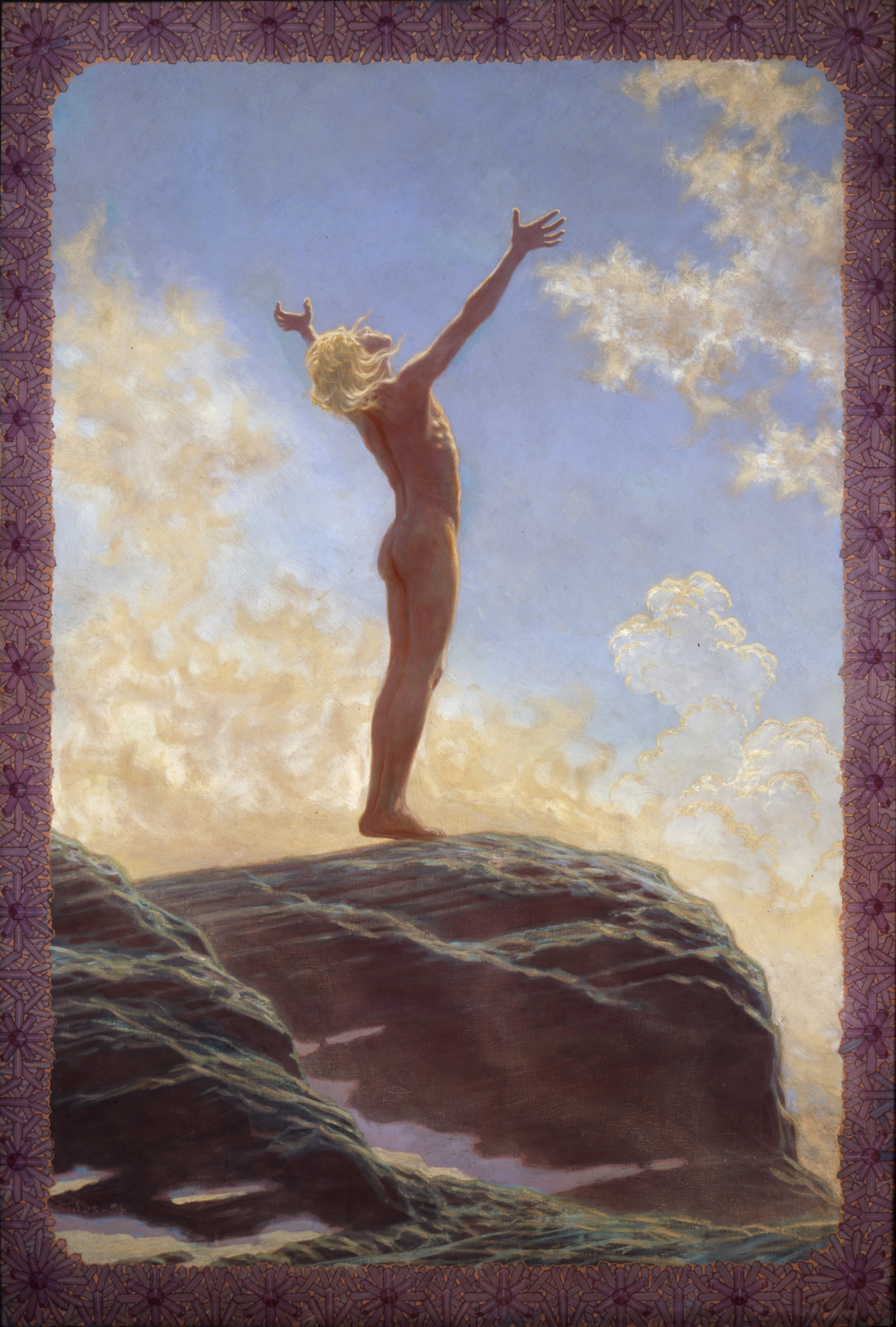
Lichtgebet (Light Prayer), oil on canvas, 1894, Deutsches Historisches Museum

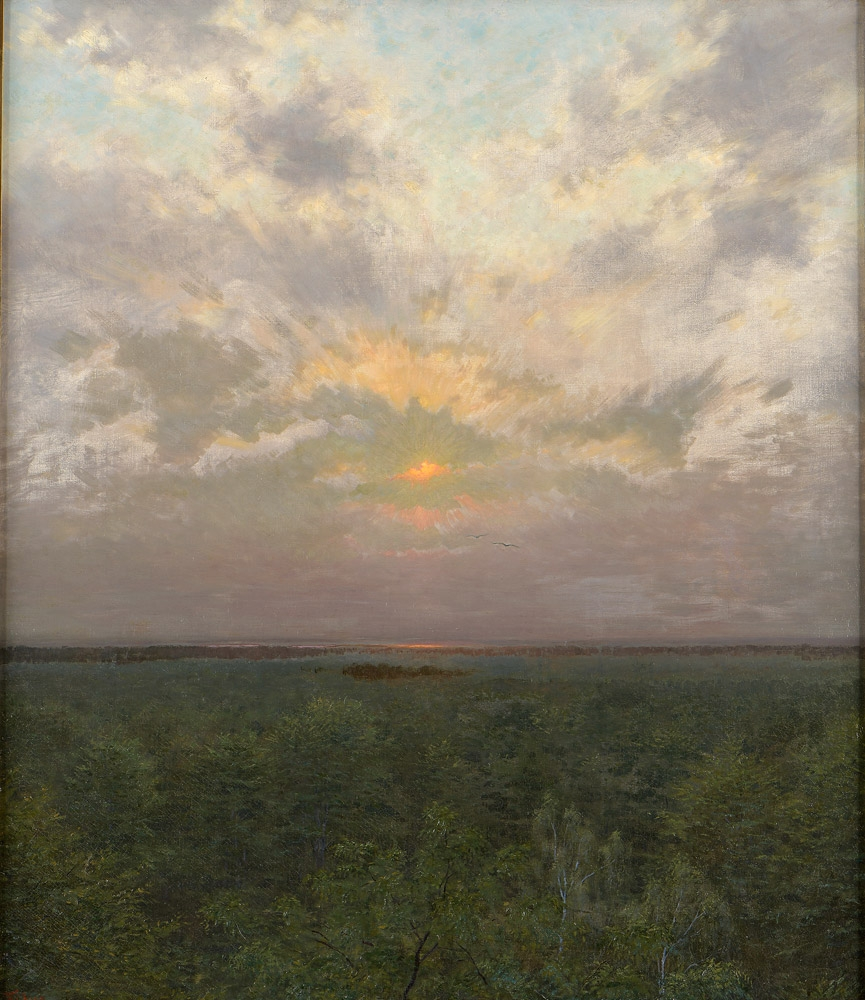
Und wieder einmal schwand die Sonne (And Once Again the Sun Disappeared), oil on canvas, 1893

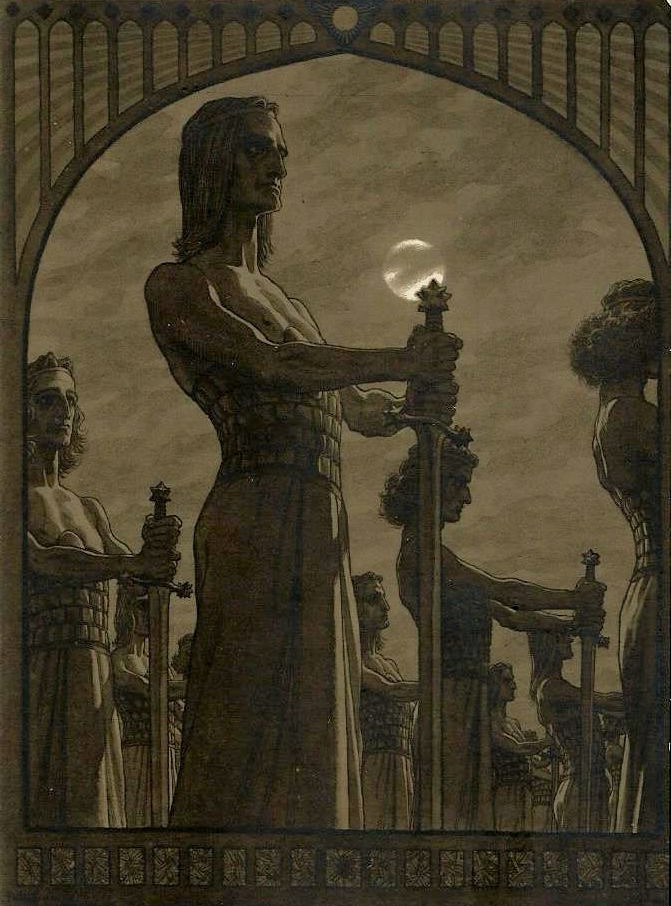
Schwertwache (Swordguard), illustration, 1912

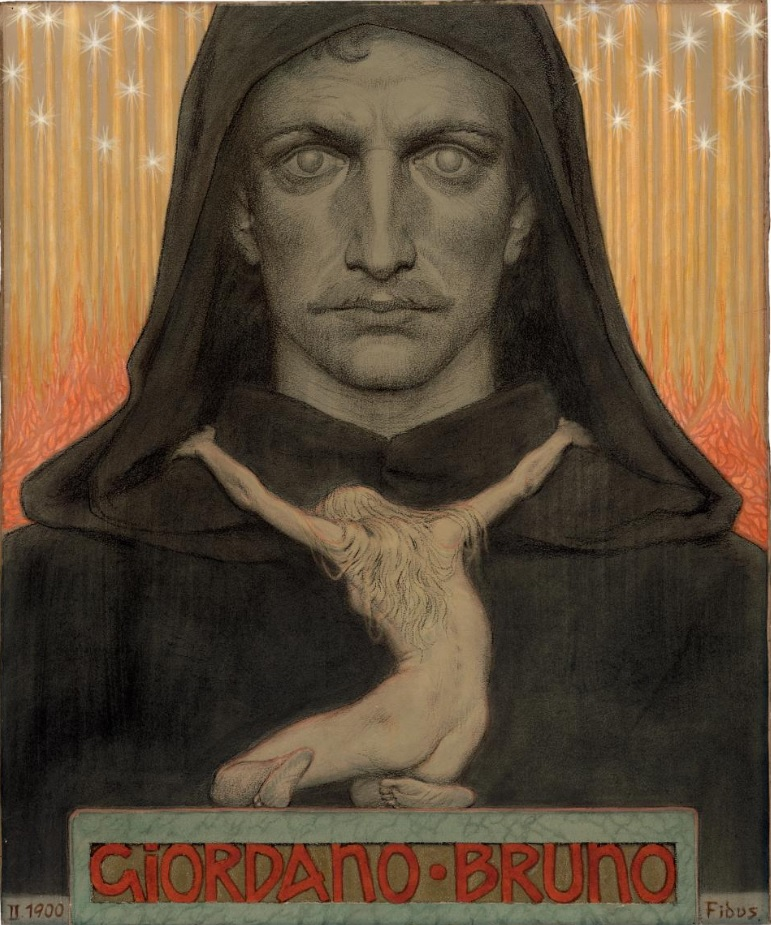
Giordano Bruno, watercolor, colored chalks, gold bronze, and pencil on vellum, 1900, The Jack Daulton Collection

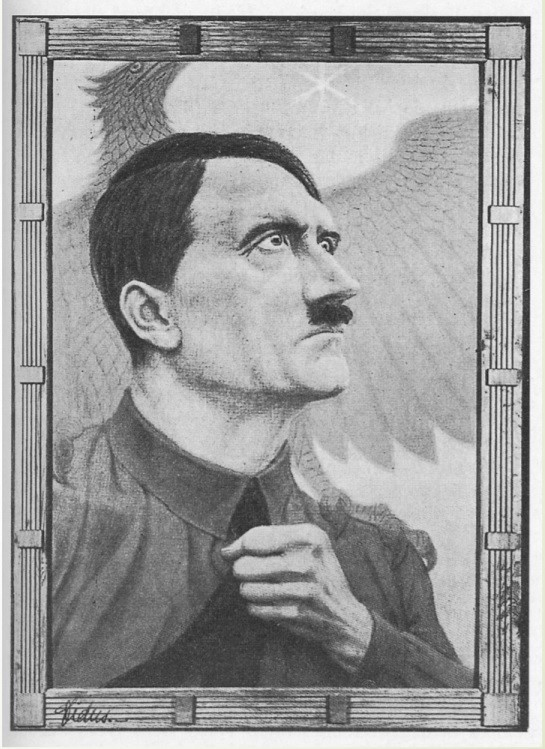
Fidus' depiction of Hitler in 1941 was hated by Hitler and he forbade the distribution of its copies

== See also ==
- Symbolist art
- Art Nouveau
- Psychedelia
- Modern paganism
- Karl Wilhelm Diefenbach
