= Adolf Brand =

German writer (1874–1945)

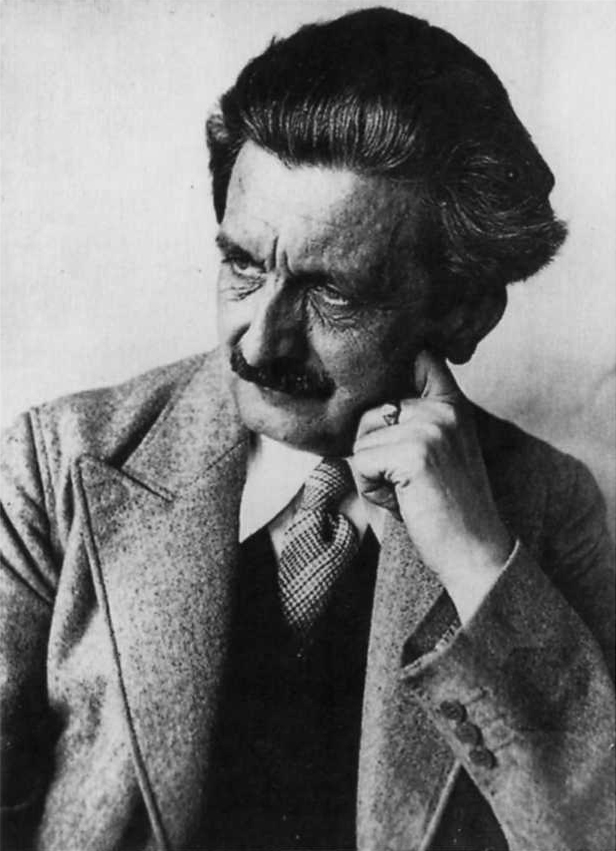
- Brand c. 1930
- Born: 14 November 1874; Berlin, German Empire
- Died: 26 February 1945 (aged 70); Berlin, Germany
- Cause of death: Wartime airstrike
- Occupations: School teacher, journal publisher, writer

Gustav Adolf Franz Brand (14 November 1874 – 26 February 1945) was a German writer, egoist anarchist, and pioneering campaigner for the acceptance of male bisexuality and homosexuality.

== Early life ==
Adolf Brand was born on 14 November 1874 in Berlin, which was then part of the German Empire. He grew up in Wilhemshagen. His father was a blacksmith.

== Career ==
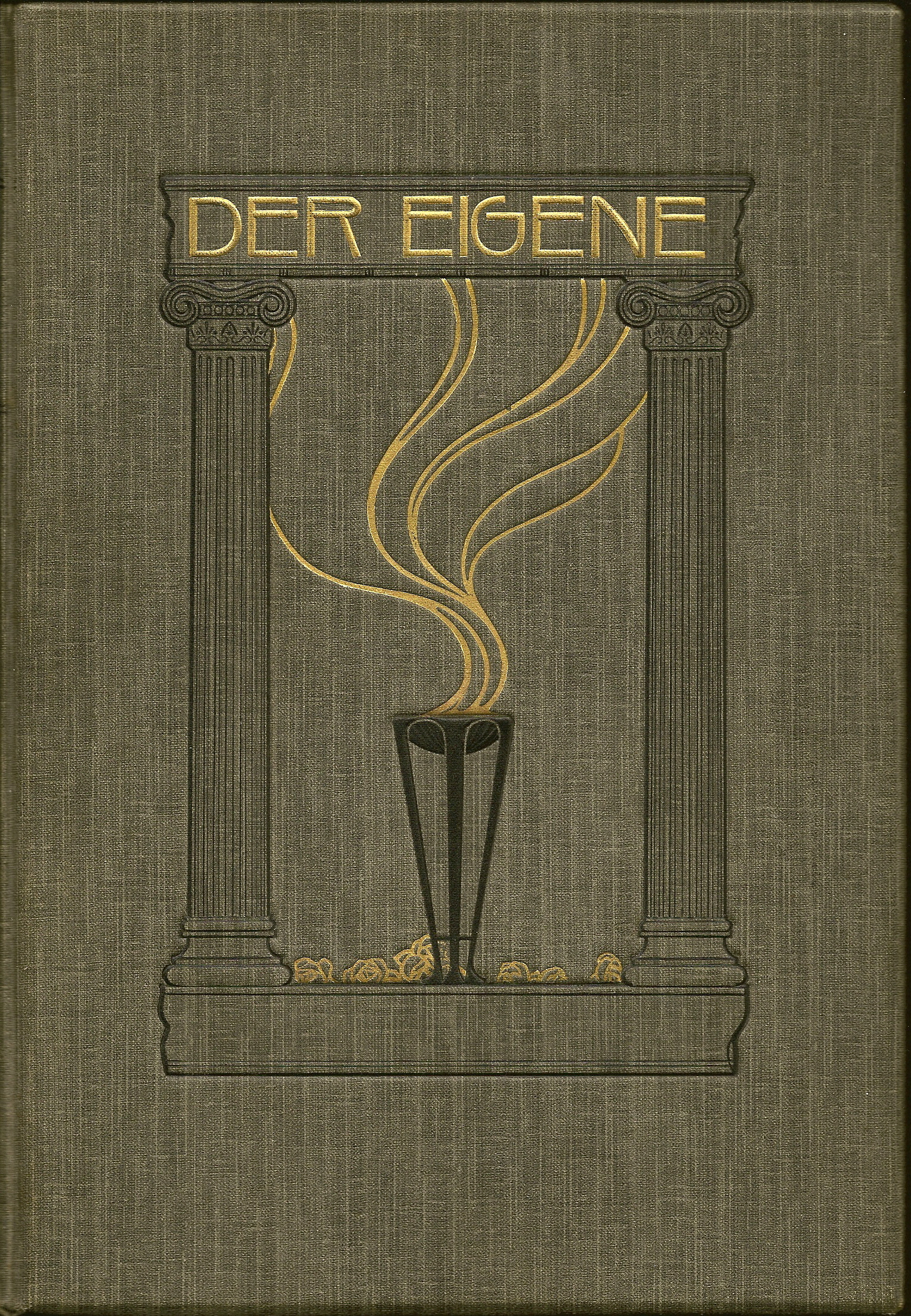
Cover of 1906 issue of "Der Eigene"

He became a school teacher briefly before establishing a publishing firm and producing a German homosexual periodical, Der Eigene (The Unique) in 1896. This was the first ongoing homosexual publication in the world, and ran until 1931. The name was taken from writings of egoist philosopher Max Stirner, who had by then greatly influenced the young Brand, and refers to Stirner's concept of "self-ownership" of the individual. Der Eigene concentrated on cultural and scholarly material, and may have had an average of around 1500 subscribers per issue during its lifetime, although the exact numbers are uncertain. Contributors included Erich Mühsam, Kurt Hiller, John Henry Mackay (under the pseudonym Sagitta) and artists Wilhelm von Gloeden, Fidus and Sascha Schneider. Brand contributed many poems and articles himself. Brand's writings, together with those of other contributors to Der Eigene, aimed at a revival of ancient Greek pederasty as a cultural model for modern homosexuality.

In 1899 or 1900, Brand published Elisar von Kupffer's influential anthology of homoerotic literature, Lieblingminne und Freundesliebe in der Weltliteratur. The work was reprinted in 1995.

In 1900, he was sentenced to a year in prison for insulting Center Party leader Ernst Lieber. In 1903, he was incarcerated for two months due to the sexual content published in Der Eigene.

Brand became involved in Magnus Hirschfeld's Scientific-Humanitarian Committee (the first public homosexual rights organization), until there was a split in 1903.

That year, Brand formed Gemeinschaft der Eigenen with the scientist (and principal theorist) Benedict Friedlaender and Wilhelm Jansen. The GdE met weekly at Brand's house. To this new group, male-male love, in particular that of an older man for a youth, was viewed as a simple aspect of virile manliness available to all men; they rejected the medical theories of doctors such as Magnus Hirschfeld who found that a gay man was a certain type of person, the intermediate sex. The GdE was a sort of scouting movement that echoed the warrior creed of Sparta and the ideals of pederasty in Ancient Greece, and the ideas on pedagogic eros of Gustav Wyneken. The GdE was heavily involved with camping and trekking. They occasionally practised nudism – the latter then common as part of the Nacktkultur ('culture of nudity') sweeping Germany. In the 1920s this would develop into the Freikörperkultur under Adolf Koch.

The Gemeinschaft opposed Hirschfeld and the Scientific-Humanitarian Committee's stance that homosexuality existed on a continuum with femininity. Brand and the Gemeinschaft instead believed that homosexuality was the epitome of manliness and brotherly love, to be expressed by any man. The group tended towards elitism who based their ideas of attractiveness around Germanic racial purity. Their views towards women were often misogynistic. The Gemeinschaft followed a strategy of outing high-visibility homosexuals. They termed this strategy the "path over corpses" (German: Weg uber Leichen).

The GdE was similar to other such groups in Germany at the time, such as the Wandervogel. Wilhelm Jansen, co-founder of the Gemeinschaft der Eigenen, was one of the chief financial supporters of the Wandervogel and also a leader in it.

The writings and theories of the romantic anarchist John Mackay had a significant influence on the GdE from 1906. Mackay had lived in Berlin for a decade and had become a friend of Friedlaender, who did not share the anarchist leanings of Brand and Mackay, favoring instead the thinking on 'natural rights' and land reform, then current in Germany.

Brand was imprisoned multiple times for his actions. Even in court, he unapologetically identified with his bisexuality.

== Later life ==
In the early 1930s, Brand retreated from activism, married a woman, and retired.

== Death ==
He and his wife were killed by an Allied bomb in Wilhelmshagen on 26 February 1945. He was 70 years old. During 1945 civilian areas of Berlin were bombed intensely by U.S. led allied forces.

== See also ==
- Anarchism in Germany
- Individualist anarchism in Europe
- Queer anarchism
