= Weijers =

Weijers is a Dutch surname. Its origin may be patronymic (son of "Weijer", a now rare given name related to Wichard), toponymic (from wijer, modern Dutch vijver, meaning "pond"), or occupational (related to modern Dutch weiden, i.e. to let graze, for a shepherd). Variant forms are Waijers, Weijer, Weyers, Wijers and Wyers. People with the surname include:

- Bibiane Weijers (born 1988), Dutch tennis player
- Niña Weijers (born 1987), Dutch writer and journalist
- Robin Paul Weijers (born 1964), Dutch organiser of domino projects

Wijers

- Clemens Wijers (born 1983), Dutch heavy metal keyboardist and songwriter
- Hans Wijers (born 1951), Dutch executive and Minister of Economic Affairs 1994–98
- Louwrien Wijers (born 1941), Dutch contemporary artist and writer

== See also ==
- Jeroen van de Weijer (born 1965), Dutch linguist
- Weyer (disambiguation)
- Wyer
