= Weygers =

Weygers is a surname. Notable people with the surname include:

- Alexander Weygers (1901–1989), Dutch-American artist and writer
- Marian Weygers (1909–2008), American printmaker

== See also ==
- Weyers
