= Weyer =

Weyer may refer to:

== Places ==
- Weyer, Bas-Rhin, a commune in Alsace, France
- Weyer, Austria, a town in Upper Austria
- Weyer, Germany, a municipality in Rhineland-Palatinate
- Weyer, New York, a hamlet
- Burgruine Weyer, a ruined castle in Austria

== People with the surname ==
- Francis Weyer, better known as Francis Goya (born 1946), Belgian composer and guitarist
- Jerry Weyer (born 1986), Luxembourgian politician
- Johann Weyer (1515–1588), Dutch physician, occultist, and demonologist
- Hannah Weyer, American filmmaker
- Hans Hermann Weyer, German socialite
- Jacob Weyer (1620s–1670), German painter
- Johann Peter Weyer (1794–1864), German architect
- Lee Weyer (1936–1988), American baseball umpire
- Martin Vander Weyer, British journalist and editor
- Sebastian Weyer, German Rubik's cube speedsolver
- Sylvain Van de Weyer (1802–1874), 8th Prime Minister of Belgium

== See also ==
- Weijers, a surname; also Weyers
- Weyher
- Weyers
- Van de Weyer
