= First homosexual movement =

German social movement, late 19th century to 1933

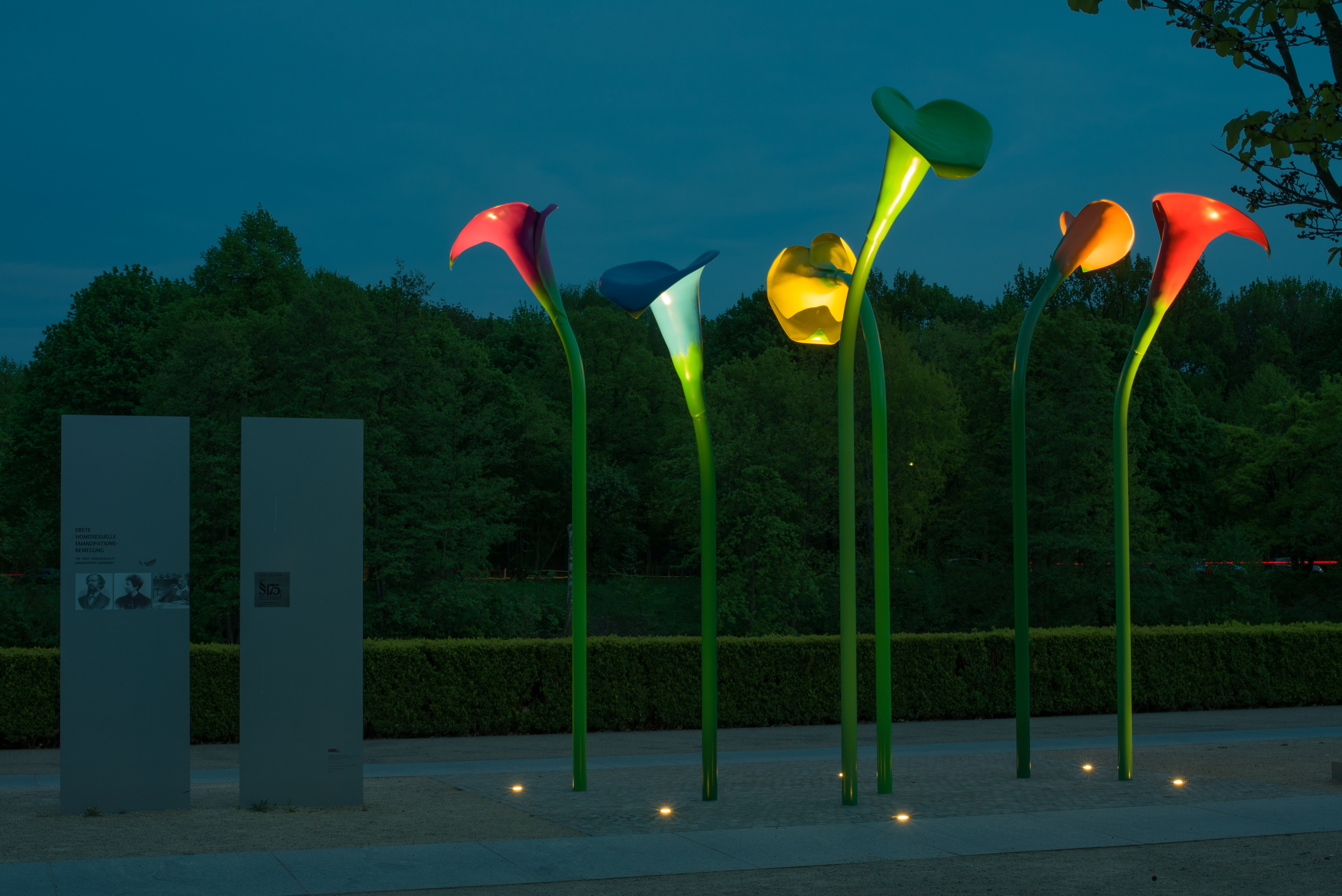
Memorial to the First Homosexual Emancipation Movement in Berlin-Moabit, unveiled in 2017

The first homosexual movement existed in Germany from the late nineteenth century until 1933. The movement began in Germany because of a confluence of factors, including the criminalization of sex between men (Paragraph 175) and the country's relatively lax censorship. Some German writers in the mid-nineteenth century coined the word homosexual and criticized its criminalization. In 1897, Magnus Hirschfeld founded the world's first homosexual organization, the Scientific-Humanitarian Committee, whose aim was to use science to improve public tolerance of homosexuality and repeal Paragraph 175. During the German Empire, the movement was restricted to some wealthier individuals, but it greatly expanded in the aftermath of World War I and the German Revolution.

Reduced censorship and the growth of homosexual subcultures in German cities helped the movement to flourish during the Weimar Republic. The first publicly sold, mass-market periodicals intended for a gay, lesbian, or transvestite readership appeared after 1919, although they faced censorship lawsuits and bans on public sale after the 1926 Trash and Smut Law. The first mass organizations for homosexuals, the German Friendship Society and the League for Human Rights, were founded in the aftermath of the war. These organizations emphasized human rights and respectability politics, and they excluded prostitutes and effeminate homosexual men, who were considered harmful to the movement's public image. The homosexual movement had limited success with the general public, in part because many Germans believed that homosexuality could be spread as a communicable disease.

The movement began to wane in 1929 with the Great Depression, an increasingly hostile political climate, and the failure of the movement's main goal, the repeal of Paragraph 175. It effectively ended within a few months of the Nazi takeover in early 1933, and the relative tolerance of the Weimar era was followed by the most severe persecution of homosexual men in history. The Weimar Republic has held enduring interest as a brief interlude in which gay men, lesbians, and transvestites took advantage of unprecedented freedoms, leaving a strong influence on later LGBTQ movements.

== Background ==
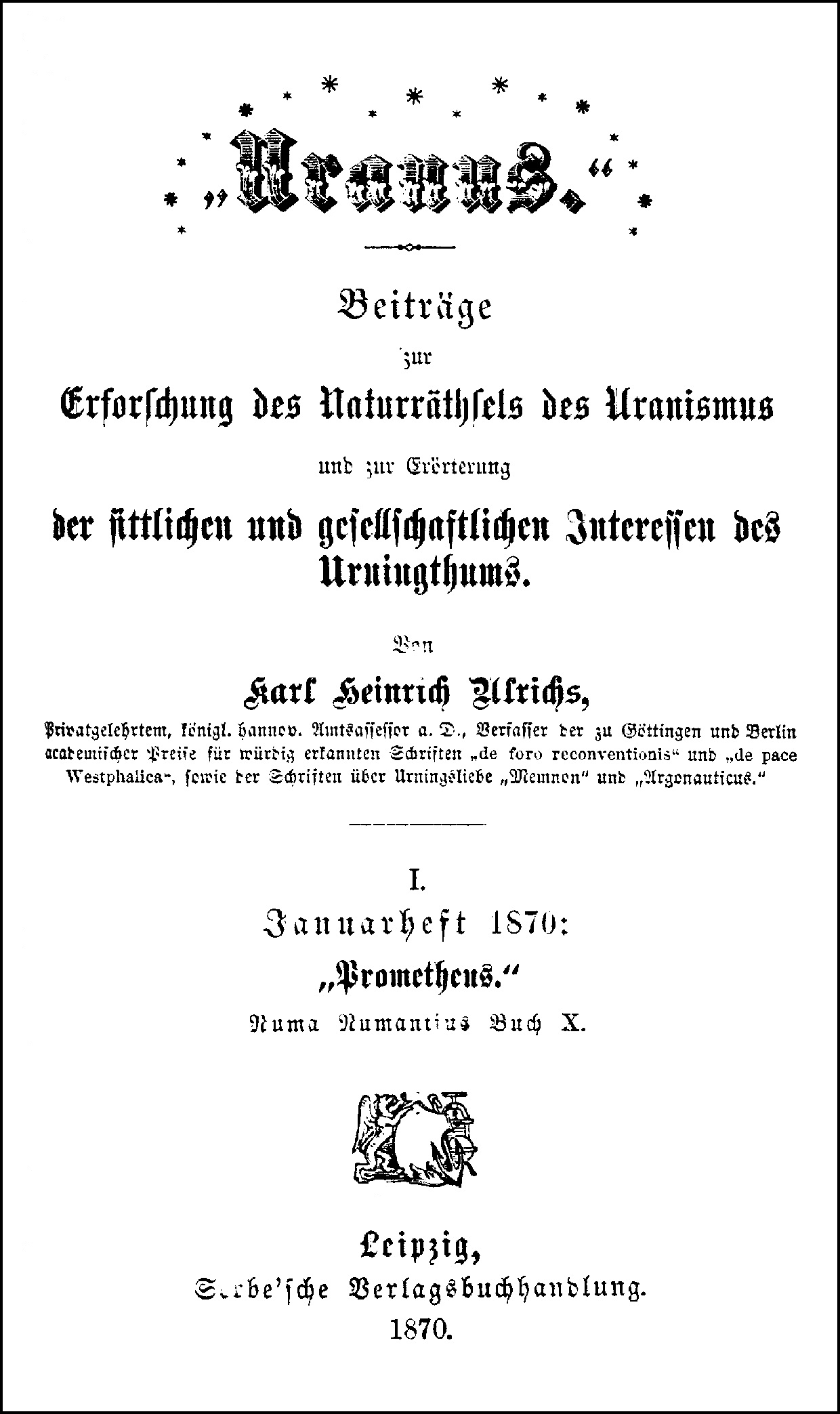
The single issue of the periodical Uranus published by Karl Heinrich Ulrichs in 1870

Homosexuals have faced persecution throughout German history. The 1532 Constitutio Criminalis Carolina, the first penal code of the Holy Roman Empire, called for the execution of homosexuals by burning at the stake. It is unclear how much laws against homosexuality were enforced prior to the modern era. In some parts of Germany, homosexuality was decriminalized or punishment lessened from death to imprisonment as a result of the Napoleonic Wars. After the unification of Germany in 1871, Prussian law was adopted by the German Empire, including Paragraph 175 that criminalized sex between men. The law was difficult to enforce because it required proof that the accused had participated in penetrative sex with another man, although case law was inconsistent about exactly which acts were illegal.

Some authors influenced by Enlightenment ideas began to criticize the criminalization of consensual sexual conduct. In the 1830s, the Swiss writer Heinrich Hössli was one of the first to voice this sentiment. German-language writer Karl Maria Kertbeny coined the word homosexual in 1869 and anonymously published pamphlets advocating against the criminalization of homosexuality. By the 1880s, homosexual was in broad circulation. Karl Heinrich Ulrichs, a lawyer, began to publicly defend homosexuals ("Urnings" in the terminology he invented) under his own name in the 1860s and 1870s. In 1867, he attempted to argue for the decriminalization of homosexuality at a conference of the Association for German Jurists in Munich, but was shouted down. Ulrichs argued that homosexuality is inborn and Urnings were a kind of hermaphrodite, who developed from a rare variation in sexual development leaving them with the body of one sex but the soul of the other. Both Ulrichs and Hössli argued that homosexuals were a fixed minority comparable to an ethnic group—especially the Jews—and consequently deserving of legal protection. In contrast, Kertbeny was skeptical that homosexuality was innate, and instead argued for decriminalization based on liberal principles.

The second half of the nineteenth century saw scientific research into homosexuality. Around 1850, French psychiatrist Claude-François Michéa and German physician Johann Ludwig Casper independently suggested that homosexuality was caused by a physical difference from heterosexuals; the exact nature of this purported physical difference became a sought-after target of medical research. At the same time, many psychiatrists believed that homosexuality was a product of environmental factors such as bad habits or seduction. Austrian psychiatrist Richard von Krafft-Ebing was one of the most influential advocates of the theory that various maladies, including homosexuality, could be blamed on the degeneracy of modern life; he was also a friend of Ulrichs and, by the end of his life, came to the conclusion that homosexuality should not be criminalized and that it was not a disease or degeneration. By the late nineteenth century, the most influential works in psychiatry considered homosexual orientation an innate disease and disagreed with its criminalization. At the same time, a widespread belief among Germans that homosexuality could be spread as a communicable disease fueled the arguments of opponents of homosexual emancipation in interwar Germany and limited the potential of the first homosexual movement.

== Organized activism in the German Empire ==
The homosexual movement in Imperial Germany was numerically tiny but it had a high profile and powerful allies. Homosexuality among men was the subject of especially wide-ranging debate involving not just parliamentary and political discussions but also medical and sexological research. According to historian Edward Ross Dickinson, the homosexual movement was extremely radical because of the deep-seated prejudice against homosexuality among educated Germans, so that challenging Paragraph 175 "potentially called every other sexual taboo into question". By 1900 the homosexual scene in Berlin was increasing in size and visibility, which may have played a role in softening public attitudes towards homosexuality. The homosexual movement was one of many social and political movements that emerged around 1900 in Germany because of the expansion of the right to vote, urbanization, the rise of mass media, and other social changes. In his book Gay Berlin, historian Robert Beachy argues that a confluence of factors, including the criminalization of homosexuality, relatively loose censorship compared to other European countries, and the influence of psychiatry meant that Germany was the place where a sense of homosexual identity was developed since the mid-nineteenth century, and ultimately catalyzed the first homosexual movement.

=== Magnus Hirschfeld and the Scientific-Humanitarian Committee ===
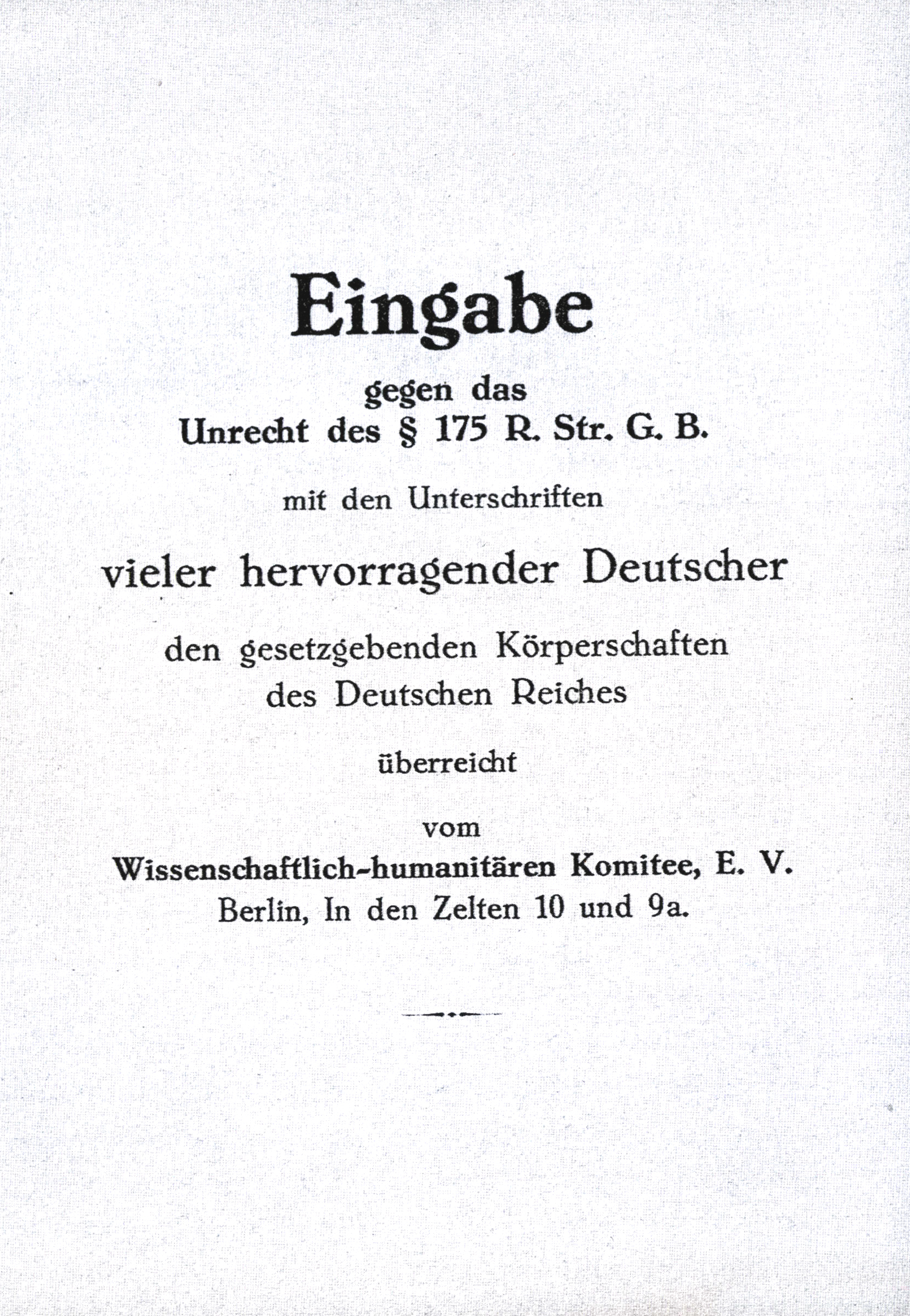
The Scientific-Humanitarian Committee's petition against Paragraph 175

The German-Jewish sexologist Magnus Hirschfeld was the most important spokesperson for homosexual rights in the early twentieth century, although he never publicly acknowledged his homosexuality. A trained physician, he became involved in activism after the death of one of his homosexual patients by suicide. Hirschfeld hoped that science could improve public tolerance for homosexuality and lead to legal reform. In an 1893 pamphlet, he argued that sexuality could "neither be acquired through environmental factors or suggestions, nor extinguished through medical treatment or psychological conditioning", which in his view made criminalizing it legally and morally untenable. Hirschfeld initially borrowed heavily from Ulrichs's arguments. Later, he developed the theory of sexual intermediaries, positing that there are no true men or women but rather every person has a combination of masculine and feminine characteristics.

In 1897, Hirschfeld founded the world's first homosexual organization, the Scientific-Humanitarian Committee (WhK), with Max Spohr, Eduard Oberg, and Franz Joseph von Bülow. Initially the founders contributed their own money; later, they were supported by a few wealthy donors. The committee wanted to present a petition against Paragraph 175 to the Reichstag in 1898 with as many signatures as possible and in the longer term to use research in sexology to advocate for the repeal of Paragraph 175 and increase societal tolerance for homosexuals. The WhK's petition had more than 900 signatures by 1898, but found little support in parliament. By 1914, the petition had accumulated the signatures of more than 3,000 doctors, 750 university professors, and thousands of other Germans, including Krafft-Ebing, poet Rainer Maria Rilke, and prominent Social Democratic (SPD) politicians. None of the WhK's petitions were successful. The WhK argued that homosexuality was natural and found in all human cultures, supporting its arguments by comparison with countries (such as France) where homosexuality was not illegal, scholarly works on homosexuality in ancient Greece, and ethnographies of non-Western cultures.

In 1899, the WhK began to publish the journal Jahrbuch für sexuelle Zwischenstufen ("The Yearbook for Sexual Intermediaries"). It also published booklets intended for a popular audience, such as Was soll das Volk vom dritten Geschlecht wissen? ("What should the [German] people know about the third sex?"), which had at least 50,000 copies printed by 1911. Many of these booklets were distributed free of charge; Hirschfeld claimed to have distributed 100,000 booklets by 1914. In 1911, amateur ethnographer Ferdinand Karsch-Haack published Das gleichgeschlechtliche Leben der Naturvölker ("The same-sex life of natural (indigenous) peoples") in which he collected all known examples of same-sex desire and gender nonconformity in Africa, Asia, Oceania, and the Americas to prove that homosexuality was innate and natural.

Hirschfeld was able to persuade some psychiatrists (including Paul Näcke and Iwan Bloch) to soften their opinion on homosexuality by introducing them to the homosexual scene in Berlin. He was also able to secure the acquittal or mitigation of the sentence of prosecuted homosexuals with his expert witness testimony. In 1909, he persuaded the Berlin authorities to accept transvestite passes allowing people to cross-dress without fear of police harassment or arrest. Hirschfeld also spent much time fundraising for the WhK and setting up its organizational structure, including branches in other German cities. The WhK included women, some of whom identified as homosexual, and sponsored research into female homosexuality, although its main focus continued to be abolishing Paragraph 175.

=== Masculinists ===
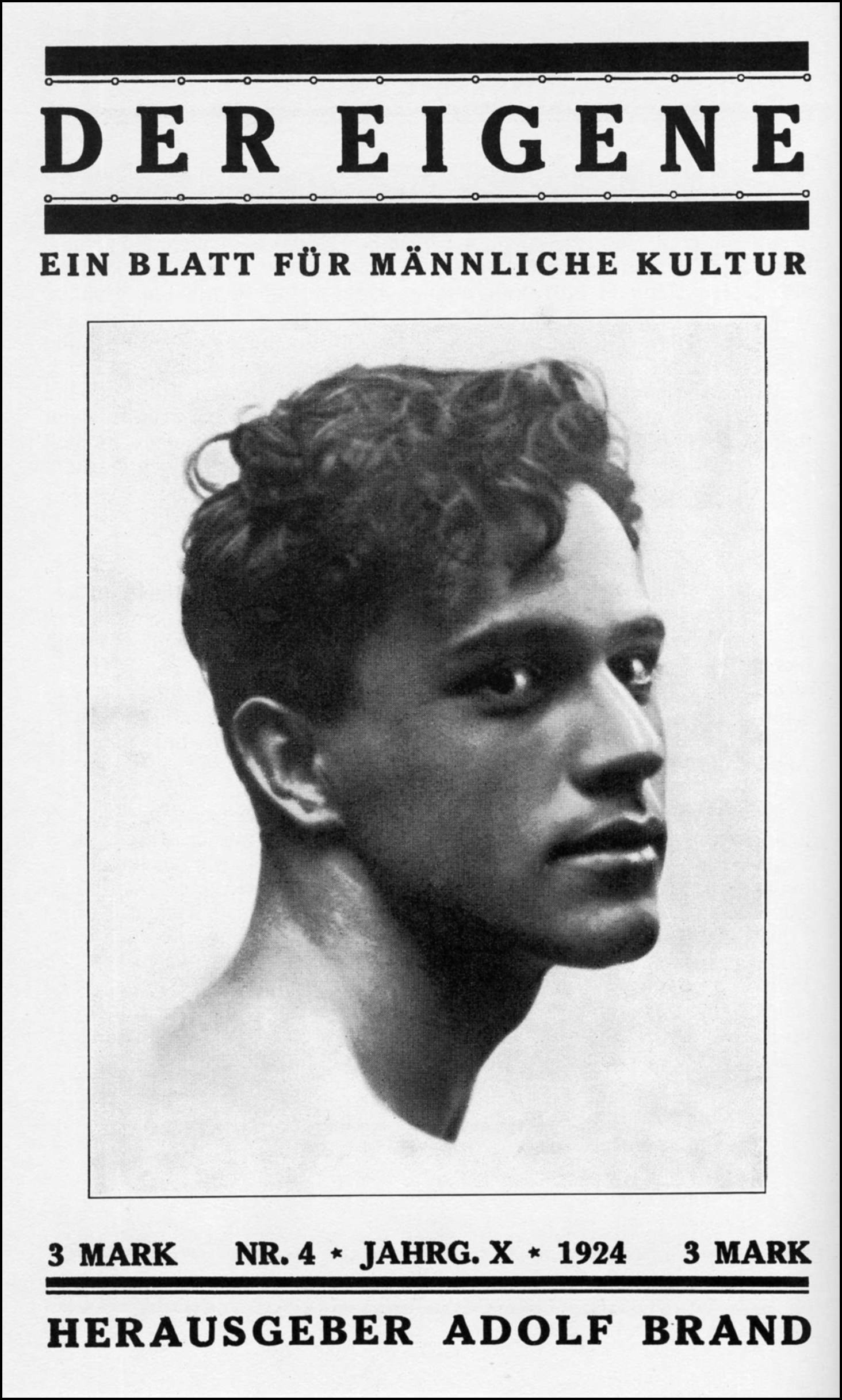
Der Eigene cover from 1924

From the beginning of the movement, the majority of activists both inside and outside the WhK endorsed the idea that homosexual men belonged to a kind of third sex with male bodies and female souls. Dissent came from an opposing faction that took inspiration from pederasty in ancient Greece in combination with modern ideas of Nietzscheanism, anti-modernization, misogyny, illiberalism, and in many cases antisemitism. They believed that the roots of male same-sex desire were cultural rather than biological, that any man was potentially homosexual, and that it was equally or more masculine than heterosexuality. None of these arguments was remotely acceptable to contemporary bourgeois opinion, leading the masculinists to be marginalized. Despite the antagonism between the masculinists and the WhK, both groups published in each other's newspapers and cited the same classical figures for inspiration. Many homosexual men saw value in both visions of homosexuality or hybridized their ideas.

In 1896, 21-year-old Adolf Brand launched Der Eigene ("The Special One"), initially an anarchist-leaning literary journal that was refounded two years later as the first periodical in the world oriented to a homosexual readership. It was published irregularly due to financial and legal obstacles. In 1903, he founded the literary organization Gemeinschaft der Eigenen (GdE), not intended as a competitor to the WhK. Brand's publications, which were not influential and never had a circulation above 150, often featured naked teenage boys and made allegations about high-profile figures. Brand joined the WhK because he shared its goal of decriminalizing homosexuality, but he increasingly criticized Hirschfeld's views on the third sex. He supported the Wandervogel youth groups and völkisch nudist associations. Another masculinist was Hans Blüher, known for his controversial theories relating all male relationships to homoeroticism and his promotion of all-male associations (Männerbund).

In 1906, Benedict Friedlander led a split from the WhK, arguing that sexuality was not a medical or psychological issue. Instead, Friedlander believed that homosexual emancipation should be achieved by a mass coming out of homosexual and bisexual men who rejected conventional morality, which he saw as imposed by Christianity and women. Brand had unsuccessfully proposed mass self-outings in the WhK. Friedlander attracted many WhK donors at a time that homosexual activists were struggling, but his initiative collapsed after his death in 1908.

=== Political debate ===
At the end of the nineteenth century there was debate over the Lex Heinze, a law that increased penalties for various sexual misdemeanors. August Bebel, the leader of the SPD and one of the first supporters of the WhK's petition, brought up Paragraph 175 in parliament, possibly to show the hypocrisy of the proposed law. Bebel argued that homosexuality was so prevalent that if everyone breaking the law was arrested, Germany's prisons would overflow. The law could only function if applied arbitrarily, leading poorer men to be jailed for the same actions for which wealthier men went unpunished. Bebel and other social democrats were persuaded by the writings of Marxist journalist Eduard Bernstein, who condemned the prosecution of Oscar Wilde. Although homophobia was also prevalent among working-class Germans and some SPD politicians continued to support criminalization, the SPD was the most consistent ally of the anti-175 movement. Hirschfeld considered it a victory that the Reichstag discussed Paragraph 175 in 1898 and again in 1905, by which point the SPD had adopted many of his own talking points.

In late 1906, Maximilian Harden published several articles in Die Zukunft in which he accused Philipp, Prince of Eulenburg, and his associates of homosexual relationships and connected this to Eulenburg's advocacy of less antagonistic foreign relations. Kuno von Moltke subsequently sued Harden for libel, and court cases continued for more than two years. Hirschfeld testified as an expert witness in Moltke's trial, initially claiming that he was likely homosexual, although he changed his statement at the retrial. Hirschfeld hoped that exposing the fact that some prominent Germans were homosexual would show that Paragraph 175 was hypocritical. In a separate case, Brand was jailed for libel after claiming that Chancellor Bernhard von Bülow was homosexual. The affair was a disaster for the homosexual movement. Many German opinion makers began to believe that the affair harmed Germany's international image and blamed homosexuals for it. In the wake of the affair, the WhK's income dropped by two-thirds and its membership by half.

During the affair, the German government began to consider reforms to the penal code. Instead of abolishing Paragraph 175, the parliamentary committee proposed to increase penalties for male prostitution and abuse of authority. A 1909 draft version of the penal code argued that homosexuality was a "danger to the state, since it is suited to damage men most severely in their character and in their civil existence, to wreck family life, and to corrupt male youth". This draft proposed criminalizing homosexuality also for women, which was ridiculed even by conservatives and drew the opposition of the women's movement. Although a few women's activists supported the proposal as it would have equalized the legal situation of male and female homosexuality, most rejected it as the proposed law would have exposed many women who lived together for economic reasons to false accusations and blackmail. The Bund Deutscher Frauenvereine passed a resolution calling for the decriminalization of sexual acts that did not harm non-consenting parties. In 1911, the WhK and the League for the Protection of Motherhood campaigned against the reform; their partnership lasted until 1933. More repressive versions of Paragraph 175 continued to be debated until World War I, which ended the plan to reform the penal code.

== World War I ==
Many homosexuals, like other Germans, volunteered to join the German Army and Imperial Navy after the outbreak of World War I. In April 1915, the WhK reported that more than half its membership was serving in the German Empire's military. There was little organizing during the war. Although some German servicemembers were charged with violating Paragraph 175, the military authorities did not aggressively investigate homosexual incidents. In 1918, Germany lost the war and signed an armistice, sparking the German Revolution of 1918–1919. After the war, it was a widespread belief that homosexuals, along with socialists, Jews, women, and others, had stabbed Germany in the back and caused its defeat. Homosexual activists cited their participation in the war as evidence of their patriotism and right to exist as free and equal citizens.

== Weimar Republic ==
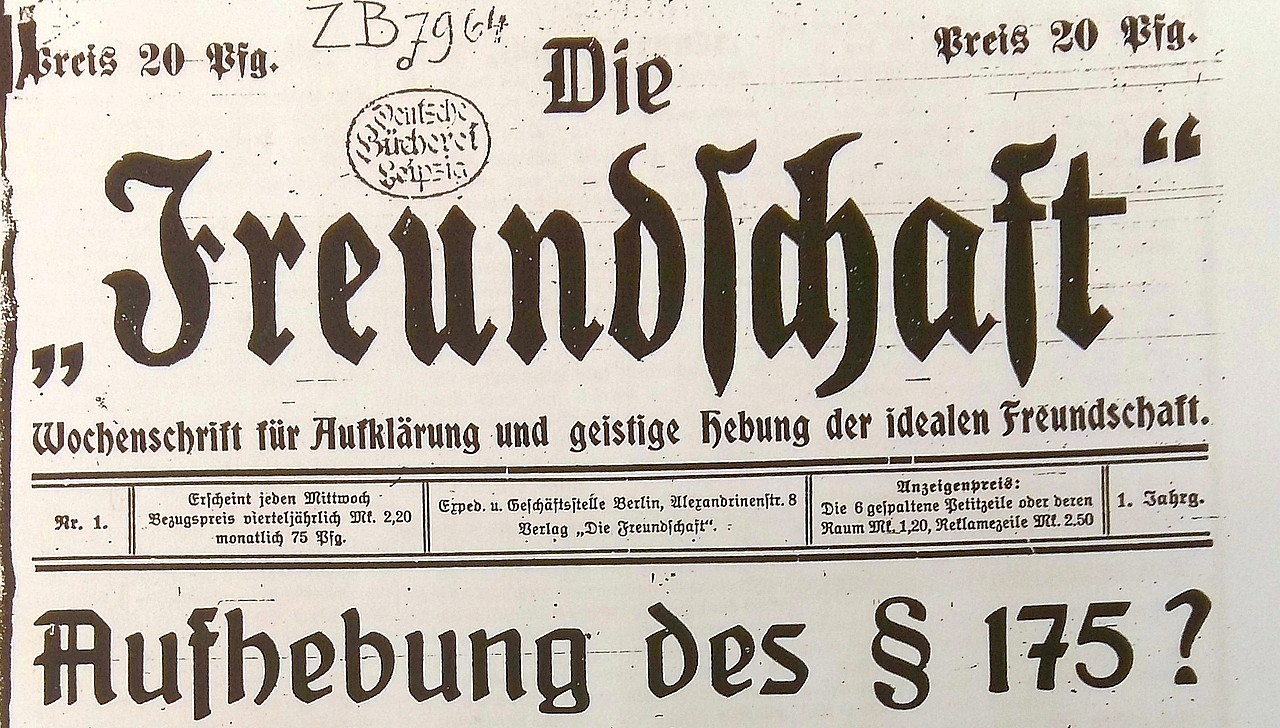
Heading of the first issue of Die Freundschaft, 1919, calling for the abolition of Paragraph 175

After the revolution, the Weimar Republic was founded with one of the most modern and progressive constitutions in the world. Traditional values seemed to have lost their hold on society during the era of revolutionary change. Many homosexuals believed that they too would be able to enjoy greater freedom as a result of the war and the revolution, and made bolder claims to public space. There was a shift from science to human rights and citizenship in the discourse of the homosexual movement. The magazine Die Freundschaft was launched a year after the revolution and was the first homosexual publication to sell in kiosks to a mass audience. Its editor Max Danielsen proclaimed, "The hour of liberation is now or never, for us ... We, the ostracized, persecuted, and misjudged, are set aglow by a new age of equal respect and equality."

=== Homosexual scenes ===
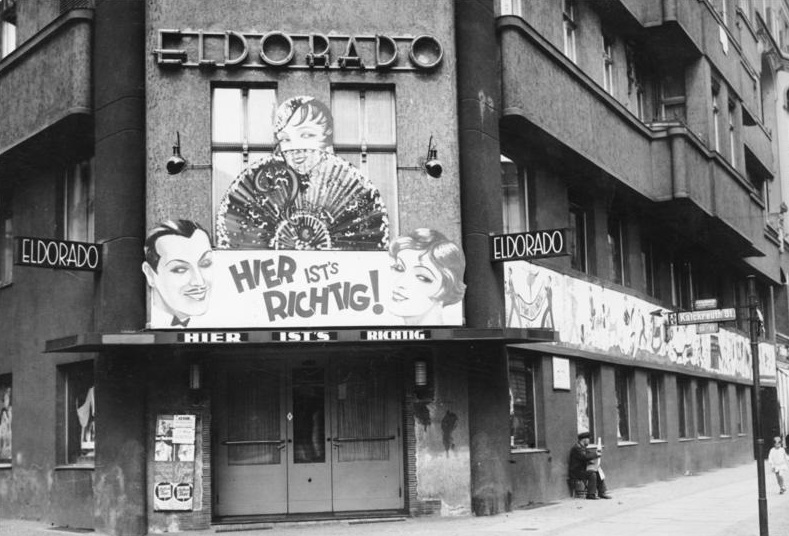
Eldorado (pictured in 1932), the most famous gay establishment in Germany

The homosexual scenes in different German cities, although already in development during the nineteenth century, increased in visibility during the Weimar era. By the mid-19th century, homosexuals were gathering in specific bars in Berlin despite male-on-male sexual acts being outlawed, and in 1880 the first specifically gay-oriented establishment was opened; these estlablishments continued as, despite some police efforts, mass arrests at these locations were rare. Male prostitutes were noticeable in some German cities; most were under the age of 25 but above the age of consent, and many had migrated to cities looking for a job but lacked other economic opportunities. The beginning of the Great Depression in 1929 further worsened the prospects of working-class men and led to an increase in homosexual prostitution. Hiring a prostitute put older homosexuals at risk of theft and blackmail. Conversely, homosexual men were seen by the opponents of the homosexual movement as preying on vulnerable youths and seducing them into becoming homosexual with monetary payments—a theory often cited by proponents of keeping Paragraph 175.

By 1923 there were nearly a hundred gay and lesbian establishments in Berlin, segregated by class and other factors. Although most establishments were rather sedate, Berlin drew in internal migration of gay, lesbian, and gender divergent Germans as well as international sex tourists such as Christopher Isherwood. The bars were known for throwing elaborate balls. Other German cities, including Hamburg, Hannover, Düsseldorf, and Cologne also enjoyed thriving gay scenes during the Weimar era, although Catholic Southern Germany was much less hospitable. In Munich the police shut down any homosexual establishment that became known to the authorities, seized homosexual publications, and surveilled known homosexual meeting places. Richard Linsert, a prominent homosexual activist in the Weimar era, got his start in activism after a café frequented by homosexuals in Munich was shut down and the authorities refused his request to register a local friendship association in 1921. The hard-won visibility of the homosexual movement was a double-edged sword as it made it easier for the police to target homosexuals, especially in Catholic parts of Germany. Paragraph 175 was not consistently enforced. Lesbian subcultures became much more visible and larger in the Weimar Republic than they had been previously.

=== Associations ===
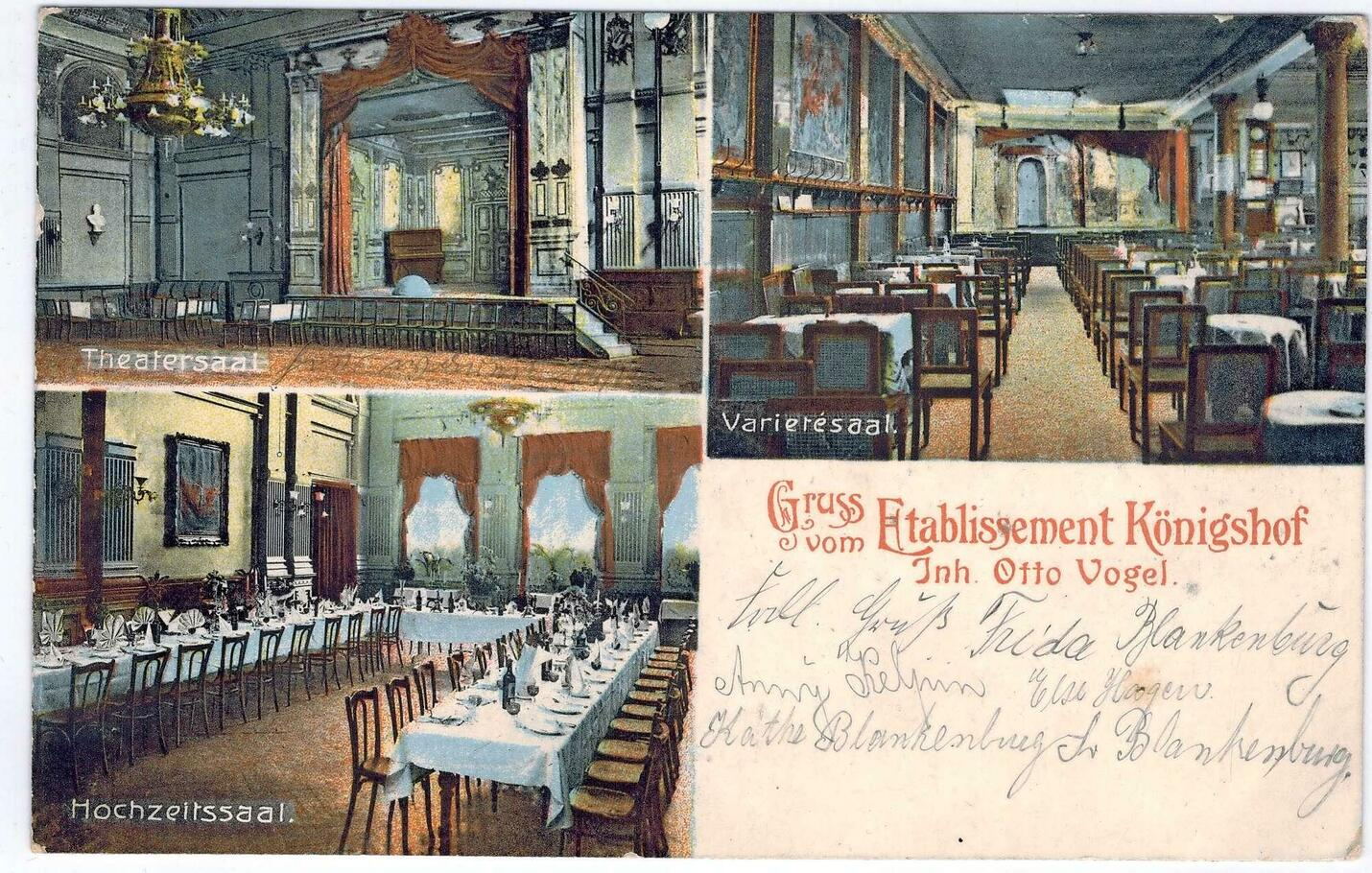
Interior views of the Nationalhof at Bülowstraße 37, Berlin-Schöneberg, which was a meeting place for gay and lesbian associations, postcard c. 1900

Groups of friends who shared homosexual feelings were organizing in German cities into more formal associations. In the nineteenth century, such associations were rare, but their popularity increased exponentially in the Weimar years. Unlike the WhK, their primary purpose was not educational or political but providing social interaction and a sense of community for their members. The societies organized meetups, dinners, and parties, soon drawing thousands of Germans; by the mid-1920s there was at least one society in every German city. On 20 August 1920, several of these societies united under the Deutsche Freundschafts-Verband (German Friendship Society, DFV). At this time, the word friend was a common euphemism for homosexual. In 1923, Berlin-based businessman Friedrich Radszuweit persuaded the organization to rename itself the Bund für Menschenrecht (League for Human Rights, BfM), and took control of it, establishing a centralized organization. By the end of the decade, membership had increased from 2,000 in 1922 to an estimated 48,000. The BfM's membership was mainly middle-class young men in their twenties and thirties, although it also appealed to some working-class men. Radszuweit also attempted to rescue the Theater des Eros, a homosexual theater group, by folding it into the BfM, but this was unsuccessful.

These friendship associations and eventually the BfM were the first mass organizations for homosexuals. Their operation was very similar to the "Urning Union" that Ulrichs had proposed decades earlier, combining politics, entertainment, and practical support. The organization offered legal services to members facing employment disputes, blackmail, or criminal charges as part of its membership fee. Radszuweit's leadership, perceived as domineering, led to conflicts. In 1925 some members seceded and reestablished the DFV. Although smaller than the BfM, the DFV helped increase the diversity of Weimar's homosexual publications. Despite its grassroots origins, the BfM relied on Radszuweit's media empire for growth, but unity was difficult to achieve because regional groups wanted to run their own affairs according to local conditions. To keep better-educated homosexuals who might have been turned off by his more lowbrow publications, in 1925 Radszuweit purged Blätter für Menschenrecht of advertisements and sent it without an additional cost to all members of the BfM. Radszuweit collected names to send them promotional material and encouraged people to leave the Blätter für Menschenrecht in streetcars or other public places to recruit more people into the movement.

==== Lesbian and transvestite organizations ====
By the second half of the 1920s, there were women's friendship associations (associated both with the BfM and DFV) in various cities throughout Germany and in Vienna in Austria. Although women were in the minority in the friendship associations, Radszuweit encouraged their participation. He set up a separate lesbian organization in the mid-1920s, and when this venture failed, put Lotte Hahm in charge of a separate women's division within the BfM in 1927. Hahm's Damenklub Violetta in Berlin offered theater performances, dances, auto tours, fashion shows, and a moonlight cruise for its members; it also had a reading room and discussion groups. Other lesbians organized independently of both the DFV and BfM, for example the magazine Die BIF and its associated organization. While political organizations for lesbian women were not successful, social clubs enjoyed greater success. Literature scholar Janin Afken argues that "lesbian clubs and their membership systems can be considered a first step toward an organized lesbian movement" but apart from the clubs and lesbian-oriented publications, there was no collective political mobilization among lesbians in the Weimar Republic.

The Weimar Republic saw some of the first transvestite organizations and publications in the world. The term "transvestite" encompassed both those who liked to dress in the clothing of the opposite sex and those who wanted to live as the opposite sex, who would later be called transsexual or transgender. Transvestites of both birth sexes frequently joined lesbian social groups, but this caused friction especially in the case of male-to-female transvestites. Radszuweit encouraged this grouping as he wanted to keep feminine men out of homosexual male groupings. Both the DFV and BfM set up dedicated groups for transvestites in 1927 and 1930; these groups struggled to attract and retain members. As it was considered "gross public indecency", transvestism was illegal and could lead to arrest.

=== Print media ===
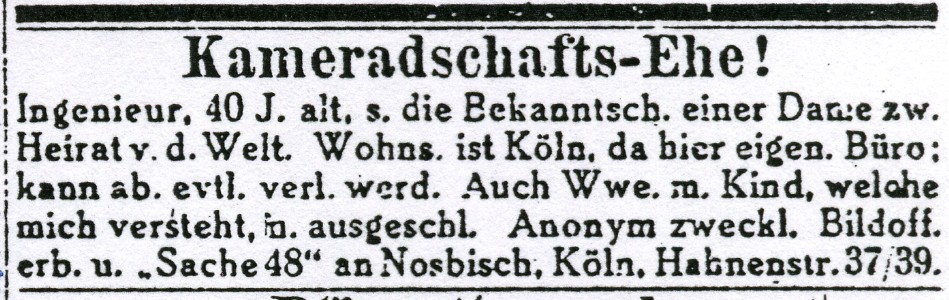
Personal ads in homosexual publications, such as this one from Die Freundschaft, were criticized by anti-vice campaigners as promoting immorality.

Mass media aimed at a homosexual audience had been impossible in Imperial Germany because of censorship, although scientific publications were generally allowed. The German revolution abolished censorship. Publishers took advantage of the opportunity to sell a plethora of new media dealing with different aspects of sexuality. The first mass publication for a homosexual audience was Die Freundschaft, appearing weekly with an initial print run of 20,000 copies. It aspired to be a "world parliament" for homosexual men and women, but its editors lacked the business acumen to make this possible and its personal ads led to a ban in 1923 and 1924. By the end of the 1920s, more than 20 publications for gay, lesbian, and gender divergent audiences were published in Germany.

Among those taking advantage of new business opportunities was Radszuweit, who built a publishing house that catered to gay and lesbian readers. Unlike the nonprofit organizations that preceded him, Radszuweit ran his publishing house like a business, seeing the pursuit of profit and the pursuit of homosexual rights to be compatible. By selling to as many readers as possible, Radszuweit wanted to both make money and promote the cause of homosexual equality. His publications used plain language and salacious images of naked young men to attract readers. Radszuweit combined entertainment and politics in his magazines. He used his magazines to promote the BfM and advertise its events as well as encourage pink capitalism by advising his readers to patronize businesses owned by homosexuals. Although critics decried the lowbrow nature of his publications, Radszuweit maintained that only by reaching a large audience could the cause of decriminalization be achieved. His awareness of different content preferences among German homosexuals and exploitation of market segmentation with multiple publications enabled Radszuweit to increase circulation. In 1926 he claimed a total circulation of 5,140,000 copies for all his titles. Radszuweit's magazines had subscribers outside Germany, some as far away as Brazil.

In the Weimar years, there was the first attempt to compile a canon of homosexual literature and find historical figures who were claimed to be gay. Relaxation of censorship led to an explosion of lesbian pulp fiction, 30 novels being available to German-speaking readers as well as the first lesbian guidebook. The most famous work of lesbian literature was the play Gestern und heute, later made into the 1931 film Mädchen in Uniform.

==== Censorship ====
Censorship advocates, who ranged from pro-democracy moderates to the far right, believed that exposure to the wrong media would turn young people to promiscuity or homosexuality instead of heterosexual family relationships. In the aftermath of a devastating war, there was a moral panic about sexualized media, which they perceived to be a threat to the German nation. Censorship advocates prioritized homosexual publications because they believed that the publications could turn male adolescents into homosexuals. Censorship was a major threat to the homosexual movement, which depended on these publications to exist and grow. While conservatives feared that a book or magazine would suddenly transform a person's sexuality, lesbians described reading as part of a process in which they discovered their sexuality. For homosexuals who were afraid to come out, lived in less tolerant parts of Germany, or could not afford to participate in other aspects of the subculture, the magazines provided their only connection to like-minded people and fostered a sense of community and identity.

There was a trial of Die Freundschaft for violating the anti-obscenity statute, Paragraph 184, in 1921. The court convicted the defendants, and the conviction was upheld on appeal to the supreme court. The ruling nevertheless was considered a victory for homosexual publications as the court set limits on what content could be considered obscene that expanded free expression compared to the prewar period. The court decision banned erotic material defined broadly (one passage deemed obscene discussed two men kissing). Adapting to this decision, homosexual publications tried to avoid any sexual content, including in their personal ads. Hirschfeld, one of the only sexologists in Germany who argued that homosexuality was exclusively innate, testified for the defense at many censorship trials. In the early 1920s, Brand also faced lawsuits over his publications, especially their personal ads.

In 1926, the Reichstag passed the Trash and Smut Law, which targeted publications considered immoral and aesthetically worthless; affected publications could not be publicly displayed or sold to minors. Almost all homosexual publications publicly sold between 1927 and 1933 ended up on the lists of restricted publications at some point. Faced with a listing, editors of homosexual publications had a difficult decision to make: publish under a different name, wait out the ban, or keep selling to subscribers only despite losing advertising revenue. Radszuweit implemented self-censorship to get his publications off of the restricted list. In contrast, Die Freundschaft sold only by subscription after 1927 to avoid censorship. Radszuweit's attempt to promote his publications as respectable backfired, as he was unable to persuade those charged with enforcing the censorship law. Part of the motivation for targeting homosexual publications with the law was to smother the homosexual movement, which could not exist without them. The regulators recognized that the periodicals were not commercially viable without the content objected to by morals campaigners.

=== Respectability ===
Both the DFV and BfM "were oriented toward integration rather than sexual liberation for its own sake", according to historian Marti Lybeck, and defined themselves in opposition to the libertine nightclub culture. Their publications, in both political and literary writings, promoted monogamous relationships in conformity with bourgeois norms and a form of masculinity outwardly indistinguishable from broader society's. Effeminate men were unwelcome in the associations as they were seen as detrimental to the political goals of the movement, and male prostitutes were excluded entirely. Both effeminacy and prostitution were decried in homosexual publications. In the context of political organizing, neither Hirschfeld's model of homosexuality—which assumed that homosexual men have some characteristics of women—nor that of the masculinists was satisfactory, because both effeminacy and pederasty were socially reviled. By the 1920s, many homosexual magazines had adopted the belief that homosexuality is innate, and that homosexual men are not effeminate.

The military service of many homosexual and transvestite men during World War I was often cited in Weimar-era publications, and Radszuweit criticized the Reichswehr for dismissing any soldier found to be homosexual. In editorials, Radszuweit promoted respectability politics, but his respectable image was undercut by eroticized images of youths that he printed to increase sales. These images allowed his audience to fantasize about their own lives. Historian Javier Samper Vendrell states, "This position may have been pragmatic, but it was nonetheless a flawed, conformist, and repressive demand for rights."

The most-represented group in transvestite organizations were those who considered themselves cross-dressing heterosexual men, while homosexual cross-dressers were marginalized both in transvestite and homosexual associations. Cross-dressing male prostitutes and criminals were seen as a threat to transvestite respectability; accordingly, they were banned and described in the transvestite media as "scum of humanity". Lesbian and transvestite associations encouraged respectability in their publications, urged others to keep a low profile in public, and excluded prostitutes from their associations. Working-class lesbians, who often gathered in separate spaces, tended to have less interest in respectability and were more likely to support the Communist Party of Germany (KPD). Cross-dressing male prostitutes and other excluded groups may not have embraced respectability politics, but they have left little trace in the historical record.

=== Film ===
In 1919, Hirschfeld collaborated with Richard Oswald on the film Different from the Others, the first German feature film to cover homosexuality. Featuring actors Conrad Veidt, Reinhold Schünzel, and Anita Berber, it portrayed a successful violinist who committed suicide after being blackmailed. The film was widely viewed and positively evaluated by critics, generating immense discussion. Some viewers perceived the violinist as embodying negative stereotypes of effeminate and limp-wristed homosexuals. His ambiguous relationship with his younger student fanned fears of homosexual seduction. Screenings of the film were disrupted by morality campaigners, nationalists, and Freikorps. Partly in response to Different from the Others, film censorship was reinstated in 1920 and the film was banned.

=== Political activism ===
The homosexual movement was part of a broad coalition of sexual reformers along with feminists, and was generally backed by the SPD and the KPD, who supported an approach to sexuality that was based on rationality rather than religion. This coalition was opposed by the Center Party, the conservative women's movement, Protestant morality campaigners, and right-wing conservatives from the German National People's Party (DVNP)—backing the exclusive role of heterosexual marriage against "immorality", which included not just homosexual emancipation but also gender equality, female prostitution, extramarital sex, sexualized media, birth control, and abortion.

==== Different strategies ====
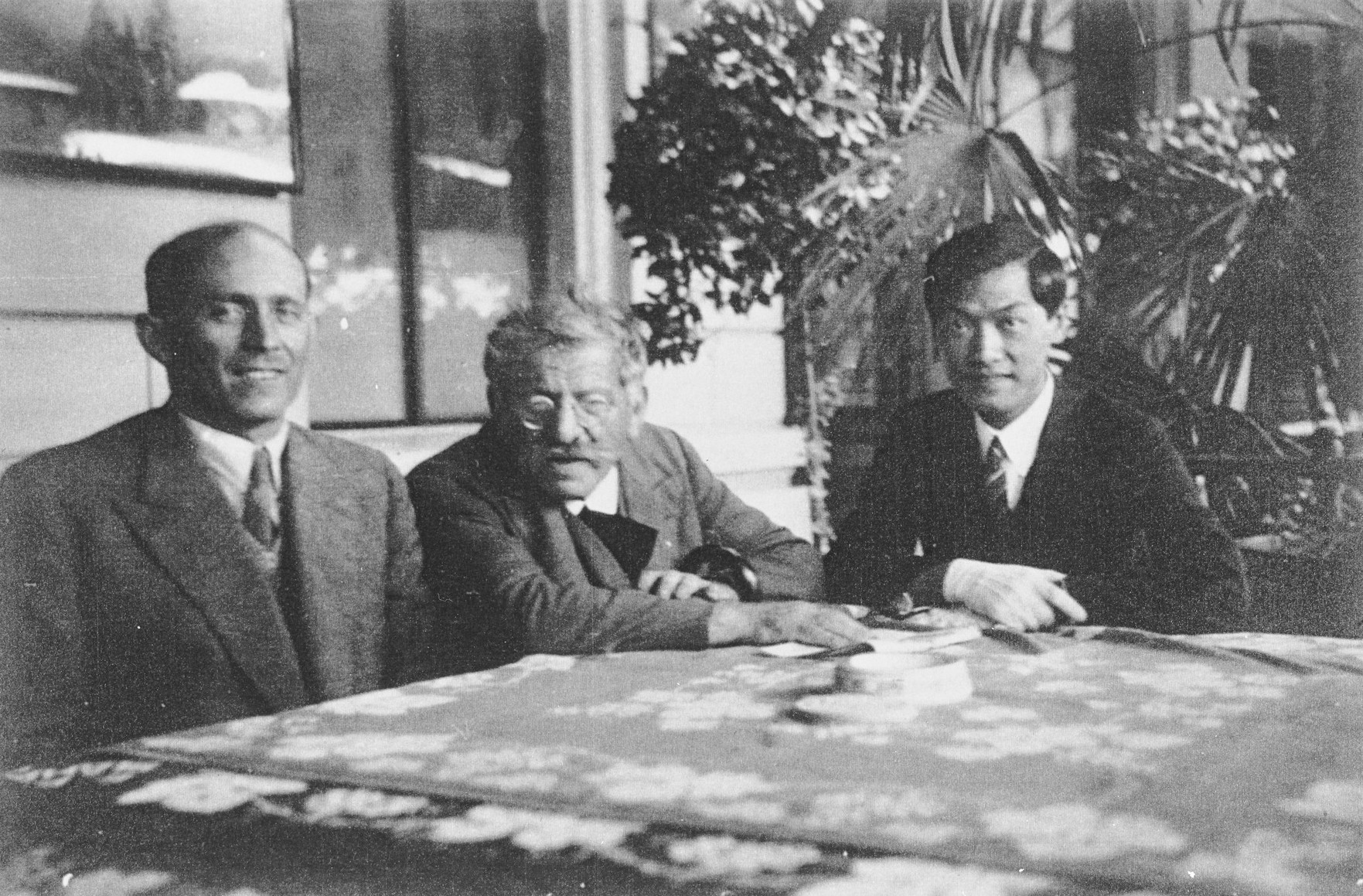
Magnus Hirschfeld (center), with collaborators Bernard Schapiro (left) and Li Shiu Tong, c. 1930

On 1 July 1919, Hirschfeld opened the Institute for Sexual Science (Institut für Sexualwissenschaft), the first institution dedicated to the study of sexuality, to an audience of prominent Germans including politicians, medical professionals, and intellectuals. Conservatives condemned the institute as a symbol of everything they disliked about the Weimar Republic. The institute carried out some of the first sex reassignment surgeries. Hirschfeld called the institute "a child of the revolution", hoping that through scientific research and public education, he would be able to persuade Weimar politicians to change their stance on homosexuality. Hirschfeld was increasingly sidelined by the end of the 1920s because of antisemitism and the competing theory that homosexuality was communicable.

Hirschfeld's collaborator, Kurt Hiller, was skeptical of the strategy focusing on research and education. Hiller advocated for the creation of a homosexual political party modeled on ethnic minority parties, calculating that if homosexuals were one percent of Germany's population and voted together, they could elect several Reichstag deputies according to the new system of proportional representation. Radszuweit also considered establishing a homosexual party, but eventually decided against the idea. Hiller also supported a mass self-denunciation of homosexuals, which Hirschfeld dismissed as impossible. Hiller, who gained increasing influence within the WhK and took over the leadership in 1929, emphasized human rights over science. From a neo-Kantian perspective, he argued that the state had no justification for banning self-expression "unless the activity of the individual collides with the interests of another individual, or perhaps of the whole, the society". Unlike Hirschfeld, Hiller directly compared homosexuals and Jews, arguing that the former had it worse.

After 1923, the BfM increasingly distanced itself from the WhK; Radszuweit was a critic of Hirschfeld's theory of intersexuality. The BfM encouraged its members to come out to friends, family, or coworkers to increase public acceptance of homosexuality. The BfM officially backed the SPD but welcomed homosexuals of any political affiliation. Although the majority of its members supported either the SPD or KPD—which shared the SPD's commitment to repealing Paragraph 175—others, especially from the middle and upper classes, backed right-wing parties. The BfM also lobbied on behalf of its members, sending brochures to parliamentarians, ministers, judges, and even President Paul von Hindenburg; in 1924 it sent more than 200,000 pamphlets. Brand and his GdE continued to exist after World War I, but the masculinists were increasingly sidelined. They rejected the values of the German revolution, and their anti-feminist attitudes and refusal to make alliances with other groups calling for sex reform alienated others. Hirschfeld, Radszuweit, and others considered them a liability because of their conflation of homosexuality and pederasty.

==== Paragraph 175 reform ====
In the aftermath of the German revolution, many homosexual activists expected that Paragraph 175 would soon be repealed. Initially, the WhK sought unity within the movement and in 1920 was cooperating with both the DFV and the GdE under the name "Action Committee for the Elimination of Paragraph 175". These efforts fell through. Both Hirschfeld and Hiller later blamed the movement's failures partly on the lack of solidarity and other qualities necessary for successful political organizing among homosexuals. The WhK continued to solicit the signatures of prominent Germans for its petition to abolish Paragraph 175, adding 6,000 in 1921 alone. President Friedrich Ebert pledged his support for the repeal effort. Gustav Radbruch, who served as justice minister for the SPD from 1921 to 1922 and again in 1923, wanted to rewrite the criminal code in "the spirit of modern criminological thinking" and proposed a new criminal code without Paragraph 175. Economic problems and the issue of World War I reparations prevented reforms.

The repeal effort was also hampered by divisions within the movement: the WhK and the BfM did not agree on the issues of age of consent and male prostitution. The WhK held that the age of consent should be sixteen, the same as heterosexual relationships. Hirschfeld also opposed the criminalization of male prostitution, instead advocating that its economic causes be addressed. Female prostitution was legalized in 1927, and it was feared that cracking down on male prostitution would lead to police raids on gay bars and meeting places. The WhK worked with other sex reformers to produce a new draft of the penal code, largely written by Hiller and published in 1927, that eliminated Paragraph 175 and also reformed provisions dealing with abortion, rape, seduction, incest, and child molestation. Only the KPD supported this proposal in its entirety. While Brand and the GdE disagreed with Hiller's proposal and instead preferred to abolish the age of consent, the BfM held the opposite position, opposing male prostitution and supporting a higher age of consent of eighteen years. Radszuweit endorsed homophobic ideas (namely that male adolescents could be seduced into homosexuality) in the hopes of placating conservatives.

The left-wing victory in the 1928 German federal election opened another opportunity to repeal Paragraph 175, but within this coalition there was ambivalence on the issue. Wilhelm Kahl (DVP) promoted a compromise position wherein consensual homosexual sex would be decriminalized, but the age of consent would be set higher and penalties for having sex with a younger man or prostitution would increase. The law's language would be changed to remove the restrictive standard of proof for Paragraph 175. Under the proposed law, men could be jailed for mutual masturbation or even kissing if their partner was younger than twenty-one. The repeal of Paragraph 175 passed the Reichstag's Criminal Law Committee by 15 to 13 votes on 16 October 1929. The increased criminal measures, Paragraph 297, passed the next day opposed only by the KPD. The supporters of Kahl's compromise hoped that it would put an end to the public visibility of homosexuals (as Radszuweit explicitly promised). Radszuweit's magazines celebrated the outcome, even though it would have worsened the situation of many BfM members. Historian Laurie Marhoefer argues that the reform was "intended foremost as a crackdown on seduction and selling sex". Some in the WhK, including Hiller and Linsert, opposed the compromise. In the end, the proposed law reform was abandoned and Paragraph 175 was not changed before the Nazi takeover in 1933.

== Decline and aftermath ==
The homosexual movement waned after 1929. Despite its initial optimism in the aftermath of the German revolution, the main goal—decriminalization—was not achieved, and the failure fueled infighting. The BfM's membership, hard-hit by the Great Depression, lost enthusiasm; funding for reform efforts also dried up due to economic deprivation. By the end of the year, Hirschfeld resigned from the WhK leadership after more than thirty years after losing the support of Linsert and Hiller, who argued that the strategy of using science for reform was a dead end. Hirschfeld received the most criticism because his approach had not proven successful, but Radszuweit was equally ineffective at persuading stakeholders or German society at large that homosexuals were not a threat to youth.

The resurgence of conservative and far-right forces and the waning of Weimar's democracy closed the opportunity for legal and social change. By 1930, both Hirschfeld and Radszuweit believed that repealing Paragraph 175 was no longer possible. Hirschfeld focused his efforts on lecture tours abroad. In 1932, Chancellor Franz von Papen deposed the Prussian government and started a crackdown on homosexual nightlife in Berlin, involving police raids and refusal to issue permits to homosexual events. Some but not all of the homosexual activists in the early 1930s understood that Nazism was an existential threat. Although he criticized the Nazis' anti-homosexual stance, Radszuweit wrote that the Nazis' primary dispute was with the Jews.

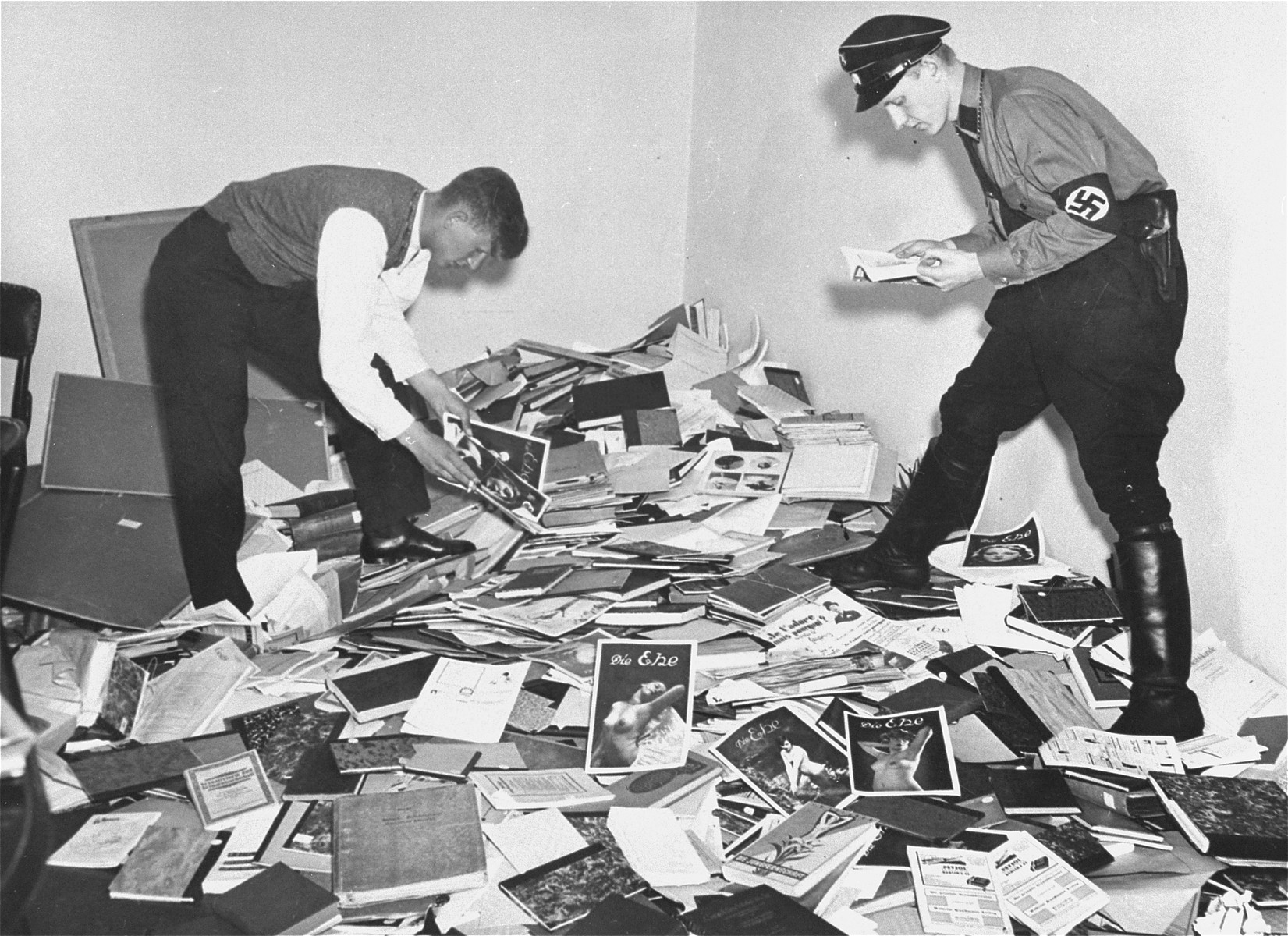
Raid on the Institute for Sex Research, 6 May 1933

The first homosexual movement's infrastructure of bars, clubs, associations, and publications was shut down in March 1933, shortly after the Nazi seizure of power. The previous month, a Reich decree had ordered the closing of all homosexual establishments and seizure of all publications. Brand initially celebrated the destruction of Radszuweit's and Hirschfeld's organizations. To his chagrin, the police raided his house five times and stole all his photographs, six thousand magazine issues, and many books. Radszuweit's company was subjected to similar raids. Hirschfeld was abroad during the Nazi takeover on a lecture tour for the World League for Sexual Reform. The Institute for Sex Research was raided on 6 May by the SA in coordination with German students. Books from the institute's library were publicly burned on 10 May in Opernplatz. The WLSR and the Institute for Sex Research's offices were both destroyed.

The WhK voted to dissolve itself on 8 June. Many homosexual organizations attempted to destroy membership lists and other information that the Nazis could use to target dissidents, and activists made agreements to keep quiet about their activities to protect their former members. Catholic and Protestant churches praised the Nazis' anti-gay crackdown. In twelve years, 50,000 men were convicted under Paragraph 175 and thousands were imprisoned in Nazi concentration camps. The persecution of homosexuals in Nazi Germany is considered the most severe persecution of homosexual men in history.

== Legacy ==
Attempts to revive the pre-Nazi homosexual rights movements after World War II were unsuccessful. Many of the Weimar-era activists were no longer alive, and the task of advancing LGBT rights in Germany was taken up by younger men and women. The first homosexual movement, in particular Hirschfeld, did influence later movements for LGBT rights. In a reaction to the introduction of an anti-homosexual law in 1911, the Nederlandsch Wetenschappelijk Humanitair Komitee was founded on the model of the German WhK. The first homosexual movement invented the concept of biologically based homosexuality and developed tactics deployed by later activists, such as the assertion of respectable citizenship. Later activists had to deal with similar dilemmas such as compromising over claims to public space. The human rights discourse, the idea of homosexuals as a minority group, and the analogy of homophobic discrimination to racism have all been adopted by LGBT rights movements after 1945 and remain in use to this day. This model has proven effective in obtaining recognition of LGBT rights.

The Weimar Republic has held enduring interest for many LGBT people as a brief interlude in which gay men, lesbians, and transvestites took advantage of unprecedented freedoms. Nevertheless, popular views of the Weimar era as one of sexual licentiousness are not entirely accurate. Although one theory holds that Nazism rose to power as a backlash against the relative sexual freedoms of Weimar-era Germany, Marhoefer argues that the rise of Nazism had little to do with sexual politics. Marhoefer argues that the achievements of the first homosexual movement "were more in keeping with a relatively narrow tradition of activism that shied away from radical claims to public space and, in addition, rejected a broader form of sexual freedom that would have included more people". As Germany became more accepting of LGBT people in the twenty-first century, the number of Germans taking pride in their country's role in the first homosexual movement increased. The Memorial to the First Homosexual Emancipation Movement, which had been proposed by LGBT groups since 2013, was inaugurated on the Magnus-Hirschfeld-Ufer next to the Spree in Berlin-Moabit in September 2017.

== Sources ==
- Afken, Janin (2021). "Myth of the Homosexual Subculture in Weimar Germany? Thoughts on Lesbian Circumstances in the 1920s". Queer Jewish Lives Between Central Europe and Mandatory Palestine. transcript Verlag. pp. 97–110. ISBN 978-3-8394-5332-2.
- Beachy, Robert (2010). "The German Invention of Homosexuality". The Journal of Modern History. 82 (4): 801–838. doi:10.1086/656077.
- Bruns, Claudia (2005). "The Politics of Masculinity in the (Homo-)Sexual Discourse (1880 to 1920)". German History. 23 (3): 306–320. doi:10.1191/0266355405gh342oa.
- Crouthamel, Jason (2011). "'Comradeship' and 'Friendship': Masculinity and Militarisation in Germany's Homosexual Emancipation Movement after the First World War". Gender & History. 23 (1): 111–129. doi:10.1111/j.1468-0424.2010.01626.x. S2CID 143240617.
- Dickinson, Edward Ross (2014). Sex, Freedom, and Power in Imperial Germany, 1880–1914. Cambridge University Press. ISBN 978-1-107-04071-7.
- Geissler, Christopher (2019). "'Eine Allerweltliebe': Critiquing European Ethnography from within the German Homosexual Emancipation Movement". German Studies Review. 42 (2): 239–258. doi:10.1353/gsr.2019.0043. ISSN 2164-8646.
- Lill, Anna Katharina (2021). ""Es ist immer gut und richtig, so sein zu wollen, wie man von Natur aus ist!": Männlichkeitskonzepte und Emanzipationsstrategien in den Zeitschriftender Freundschaftsverbände der Weimarer Republik" ["It is always good and right to want to be the way one is by nature!": Concepts of masculinity and strategies of emancipation in the journals of the friendship associations of the Weimar Republic]. Unerlaubte Gleichheit: Homosexualität und mann-männliches Begehren in Kulturgeschichte und Kulturvergleich [Unauthorized equality: homosexuality and male-male desire in cultural history and cultural comparison]. transcript Verlag. pp. 233–263. ISBN 978-3-8394-5356-8.
- Lybeck, Marti (2012). "Writing Love, Feeling Shame: Rethinking Respectability in the Weimar Homosexual Women's Movement". After The History of Sexuality: German Genealogies with and Beyond Foucault. Berghahn Books. pp. 156–168. ISBN 978-0-85745-374-7.
- Mancini, Elena (2010). Magnus Hirschfeld and the Quest for Sexual Freedom: A History of the First International Sexual Freedom Movement. Palgrave Macmillan. ISBN 978-0-230-10426-6.
- Marhoefer, Laurie (2015). Sex and the Weimar Republic: German Homosexual Emancipation and the Rise of the Nazis. University of Toronto Press. ISBN 978-1-4426-1957-9.
- Marhoefer, Laurie (2019). "Was the Homosexual Made White? Race, Empire, and Analogy in Gay and Trans Thought in Twentieth-Century Germany". Gender & History. 31 (1): 91–114. doi:10.1111/1468-0424.12411.
- Pretzel, Andreas (2012). "Homosexuality in the Sexual Ethics of the 1930s: A Values Debate in the Culture Wars between Conservatism, Liberalism, and Moral-National Renewal". After The History of Sexuality: German Genealogies with and Beyond Foucault. Berghahn Books. pp. 202–215. ISBN 978-0-85745-374-7.
- Ramsey, Glenn (2008). "The Rites of Artgenossen: Contesting Homosexual Political Culture in Weimar Germany". Journal of the History of Sexuality. 17 (1): 85–109. doi:10.1353/sex.2008.0009. ISSN 1043-4070. JSTOR 30114370. PMID 19260158.
- Samper Vendrell, Javier (2020). Seduction of Youth: Print Culture and Homosexual Rights in the Weimar Republic. University of Toronto Press. ISBN 978-1-4875-2503-3.
- Senelick, Laurence (2008). "The Homosexual Theatre Movement in the Weimar Republic". Theatre Survey. 49 (1): 5–35. doi:10.1017/S0040557408000021.
- "Denkmal für die erste homosexuelle Emanzipationsbewegung eingeweiht" [Memorial to the first homosexual emancipation movement dedicated]. Siegessäule (in German). 7 September 2017.
- Sutton, Katie (2012). "'We Too Deserve a Place in the Sun': The Politics of Transvestite Identity in Weimar Germany". German Studies Review. 35 (2): 335–354. ISSN 0149-7952. JSTOR 23269669.
- Tobin, Robert Deam (2015). Peripheral Desires: The German Discovery of Sex. University of Pennsylvania Press. ISBN 978-0-8122-4742-8.
- Whisnant, Clayton J. (2016). Queer Identities and Politics in Germany: A History, 1880–1945. Columbia University Press. ISBN 978-1-939594-10-5.
- Zinn, Alexander (2020). "'Das sind Staatsfeinde' Die NS-Homosexuellenverfolgung 1933–1945" ["They are enemies of the state": The Nazi persecution of homosexuals 1933–1945] (PDF). Bulletin des Fritz Bauer Instituts: 6–13. ISSN 1868-4211.
