= Memorial to the First Homosexual Emancipation Movement =

Memorial in Berlin, Germany

Coordinates: 52°31′07″N 13°21′36″E

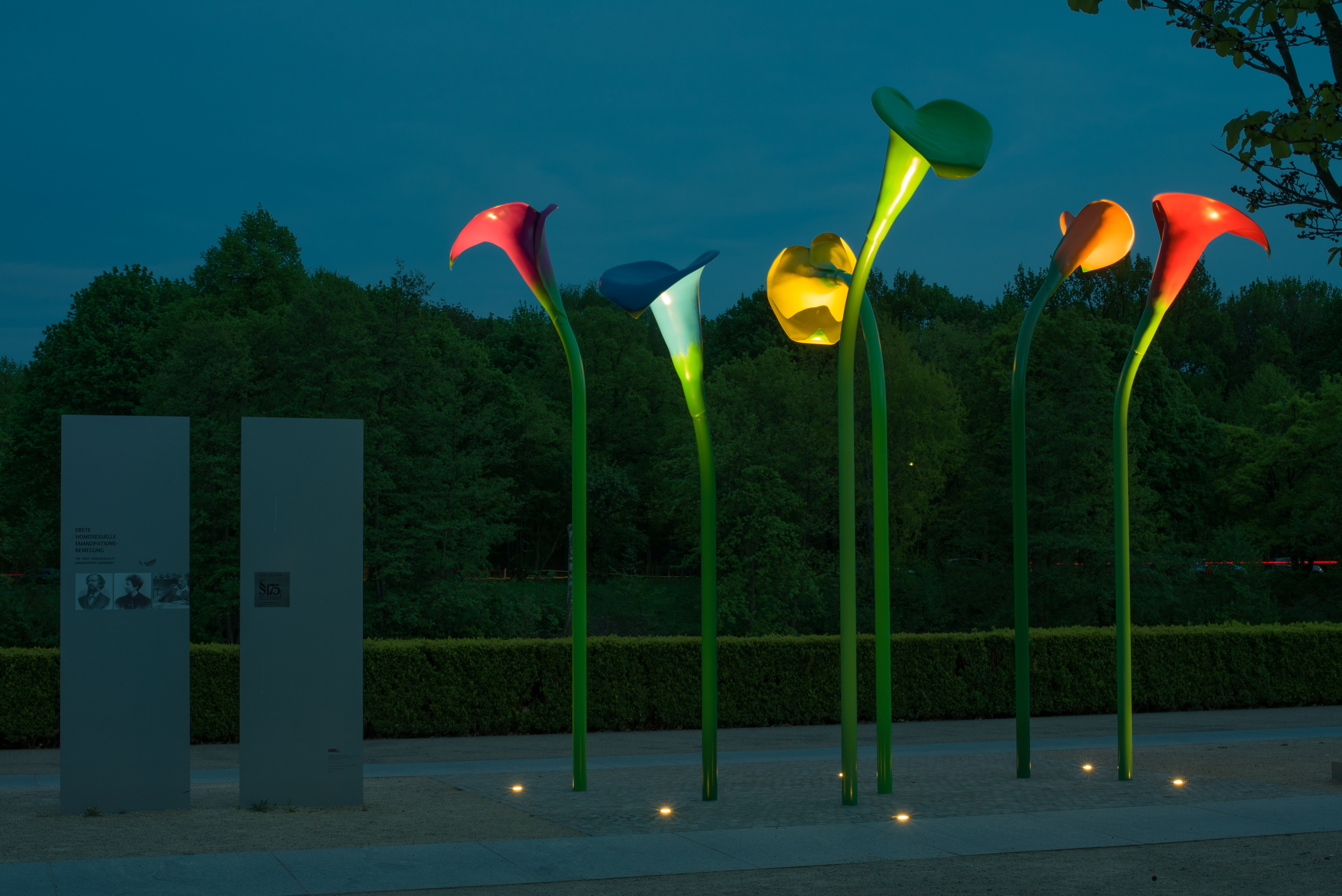
- View from across the Spree in 2018
- Location: Berlin, Germany
- Type: Memorial
- Dedicated date: First homosexual movement

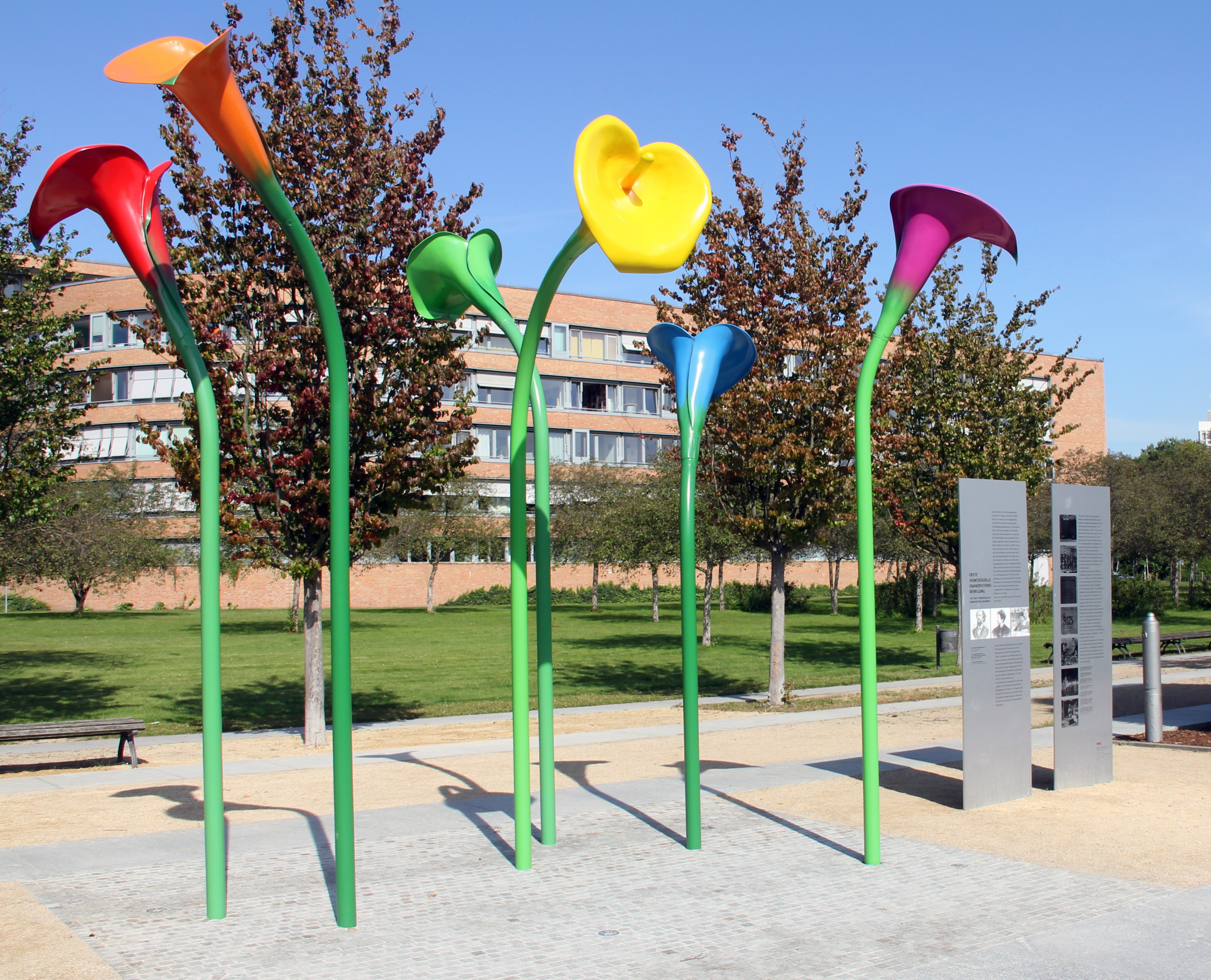
The memorial in 2017

The Memorial to the First Homosexual Emancipation Movement (German: Denkmal für die erste homosexuelle Emanzipationsbewegung) is a memorial in the neighbourhood of Moabit in Berlin, Germany. Unveiled on 7 September 2017, the memorial is located opposite the Federal Chancellery on the Spree and commemorates the first homosexual movement, which was destroyed in 1933 by the Nazis, and especially the Scientific-Humanitarian Committee founded in 1897 to oppose the criminalization of homosexuality in Germany. The Scientific-Humanitarian Committee's headquarters were located on the other bank of the Spree near the Federal Chancellery. The riverbank where the memorial is located has been named the Magnus-Hirschfeld-Ufer since 2008. The memorial includes an information panel that has been in place since 2011 and discusses the movement with portraits of Anita Augspurg (1857–1943), Karl Heinrich Ulrichs (1825–1895) and Magnus Hirschfeld (1868–1935).

== History ==
Historian Laurie Marhoefer analysed a 2013 poster soliciting donations for the memorial. The poster displayed several women, contradicting the male-dominated nature of the movement that the monument commemorated. The poster read, "A black time for the world came from Berlin. But so did the most colourful movement that there had ever been." Therefore, the homosexual movement is cited as a usable past that Germans can feel proud of.

In 2015, the winning design was selected from five designs prepared by nine students of the Berlin University of the Arts beginning in 2013. The winning design features six thirteen-foot tall statues of calla lilies in rainbow colors. The calla lily was chosen as it has both female and male parts on the same plant. The designs were displayed at the Haus der Kulturen der Welt in an event attended by 200 people including Klaus Wowereit, Petra Pau, Jan Stöß, Daniel Wesener, Klaus Lederer, and Alexander Spies. The colorful design of the memorial contrasts with the gray Memorial to Homosexuals persecuted under Nazism located elsewhere in Berlin. The monument's cost of 200,000 euros was paid by private donations and the Lotto-Stiftung Berlin.

The memorial has been vandalized several times, including incidents in August 2017, October 2018, August 2019, October 2019, and April 2021. Vandalism included bending the information panels and blotting out the faces of the activists.
