= Wyers =

Wyers is a surname. Notable people with the surname include:

- Alick Wyers (1907–1980), English cricketer
- Fred Wyers (1932–2006), English and Canadian athlete
- Juliet Wyers, American singer-songwriter

== See also ==
- Byers (surname)
- Wyer
- Wijers
- Weijers
- Wyers (squat)
