= Nicholas Rippen Abberly =

- Born: March 25, 1891
- Died: April 1, 1983 (aged 92); Cedar Rapids, Iowa
- Occupation: Engineer
- Known for: Pioneer aviator, inventor

Nicholas Rippen Abberly (March 25, 1891 – April 1983) was an American pioneer aviator and member of the Early Birds of Aviation. He was also an inventor and illustrator using several names and alternate spellings of his name.

== Biography ==
He was born on March 25, 1891.

He built and flew a pusher configuration aircraft from Mineola, New York on Long Island in September 1910. He soloed the aircraft in October 1910.

An inventor by trade, Abberly filed several patents in a wide body of disciplines, including a bottom for floating equipment, rebound equipment for fitness machines, office clipboards, and hot-formed metal columns.

He also created the drawings for Alexander Weygers's Discopter patent.

Nicolas adopted several names to identify his work, using Abberly and an alternate spelling Aaberly and at times, Rippen, which is visible on the US2377835 patent drawings.

He died in April 1983 in Cedar Rapids, Iowa.

== Patents ==
- US patent 3114345, Nicholas Rippen Abberly, "Bottom for floating equipment", published December 17, 1963
