= Van de Weyer =

Van de Weyer or Vandeweyer is a surname. Notable people with the surname include:

Coat of arms of Sylvain Van de Weyer.

Coat of arms of the family of Joseph-Louis Van de Weyer of Brussels

- André Vandeweyer (1909–1992), Belgian footballer and manager
- Robert Van De Weyer (born 1945), Belgian judoka
- Sylvain Van de Weyer (1802–1874), Belgian politician and diplomat
- William John Bates van de Weyer (1870–1946), British Army officer and botanist

== See also ==
- Mark Vendeweyer (born 1972), Belgian sprint canoeist
- Weyer
