= International Lesbian, Gay, Bisexual, Transgender & Intersex Law Association =

International association of lawyers

- Type: Bar association
- Region served: World
- Website: http://ilglaw.org

The International Lesbian, Gay, Bisexual, Transgender & Intersex Law Association (ILGLaw, formerly the International Lesbian and Gay Law Association) is an international association of gay, lesbian, bisexual, transgender and intersex lawyers. The group also welcomes law professors, judges, law students, paralegals and laypersons, as long as they are committed to LGBTI equality under the law.

== History ==
ILGLaw was formed in 1999 at King's College London by "lawyers from three different continents" after the Admiral Duncan pub bombing that targeted gay people. The organization hosted conferences in 2000 in Amsterdam, in 2002 in Turin, Italy, featuring keynote speakers such as Justice Edwin Cameron of the Constitutional Court of South Africa and Justice Wilhelmina Thomassen of the European Court of Human Rights. ILGLaw participated in the Lavender Law conference in New York City in October 2003, and hosted its third conference in partnership with the University of Toronto Faculty of Law in 2005.

== Activities ==
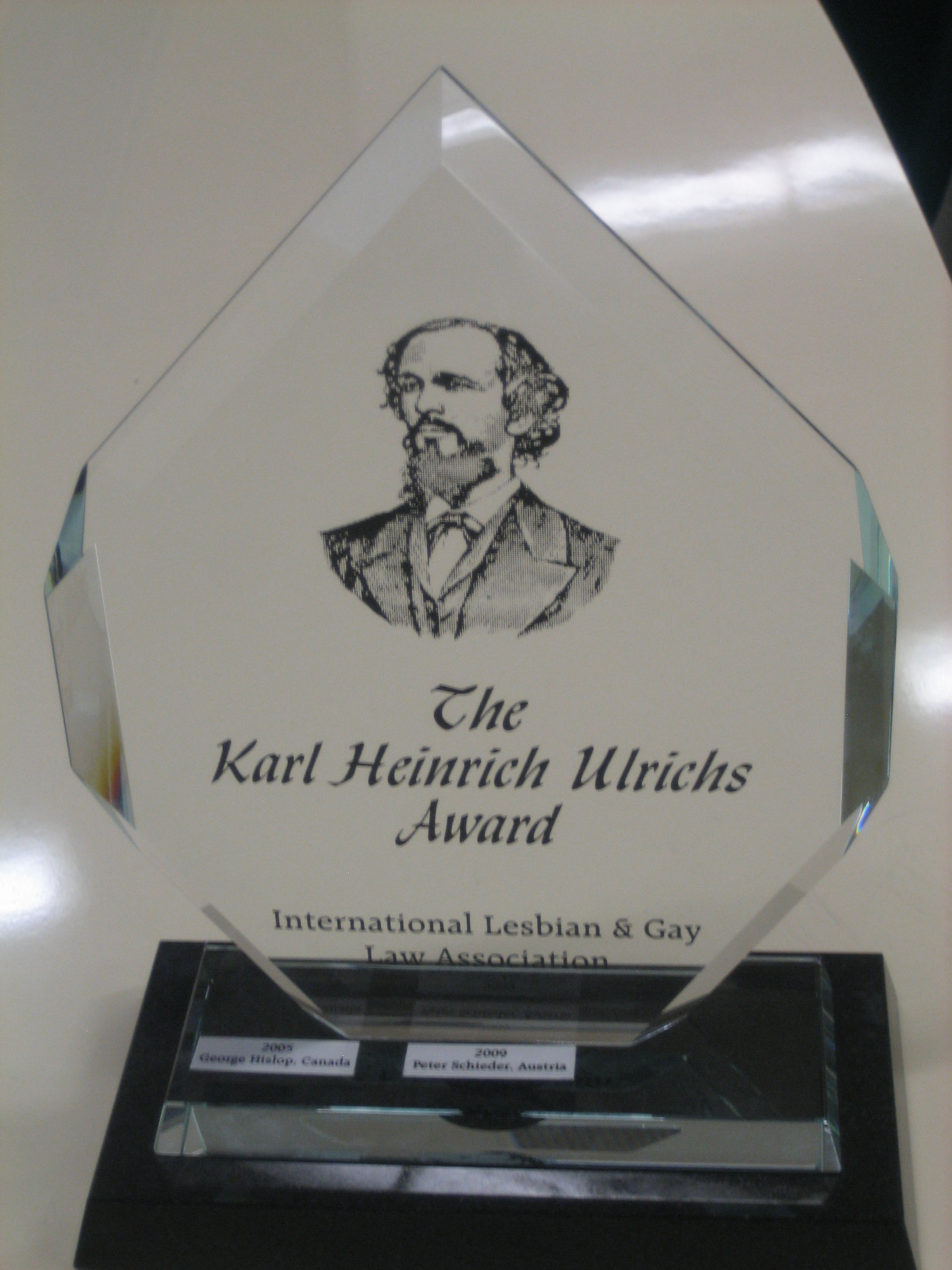
The Karl Heinrich Ulrichs Award

With the William Institute at UCLA School of Law and others, ILGLaw sponsored a symposium called "Justice in the Balkans: Equality for Sexual Minorities" in October 2009.

The association presents the Karl Heinrich Ulrichs Award for distinguished contributions to the advancement of LGBTI equality. The award is named in honour of Karl Heinrich Ulrichs, a German activist for homosexual equality, described as "the first gay person to publicly out himself.", and also believed to be the first gay lawyer. The award was announced in 2002 and presented at the organization's conferences in 2005 and 2009.

- 2005 – George Hislop, Canadian activist and politician
- 2009 – Peter Schieder, Austrian and European politician

== See also ==
- Category:LGBTQ judges
- International Lesbian, Gay, Bisexual, Trans and Intersex Association
- Intersex civil society organizations
- Intersex human rights
- List of LGBT rights organisations
