= Weyers =

Weyers is a surname. Notable people with the surname include:

- Anrune Weyers (born 1992), South African athlete
- Carole Weyers (born 1984), Belgian actress
- Denise Weyers (fl. 1969–1978), South African cricketer
- Howard Weyers (1934–2018), American football player and assistant coach
- Marius Weyers (born 1945), South African actor

== See also ==
- Weijers, variant spelling of the same name
- Weyer (disambiguation)
- Weyers Cave, is a census-designated place in Augusta County, Virginia, United States
- Weyers Cave School, is a historic public school building located at Weyers Cave, Augusta County, Virginia (US)
