= Wijers =

Wijers is a Dutch surname. Notable people with the surname include:

- Bertha Tideman-Wijers (1887–1976) Dutch composer
- Clemens Wijers (born 1983), Dutch keyboardist, pianist, and composer
- Hans Wijers (born 1951), Dutch politician and businessman
- Louwrien Wijers (born 1941), Dutch artist and writer
