= Wichard =

Wichard may refer to:

== People ==
=== Given names ===
- Wichard Joachim Heinrich von Möllendorf (1724–1816), Generalfeldmarschall of the Kingdom of Prussia
- Wichard von Alvensleben (1902–82), German agriculturist, Wehrmacht Officer and Knight of the Order of Saint John

=== Surnames ===
- Al "Cake" Wichard, American blues and jazz drummer
- Gary Wichard (d. 2011), American college football player and professional sports agent
