= Karl Heinrich Ulrichs =

German gay rights activist and promoter of Living Latin (1825–1895)

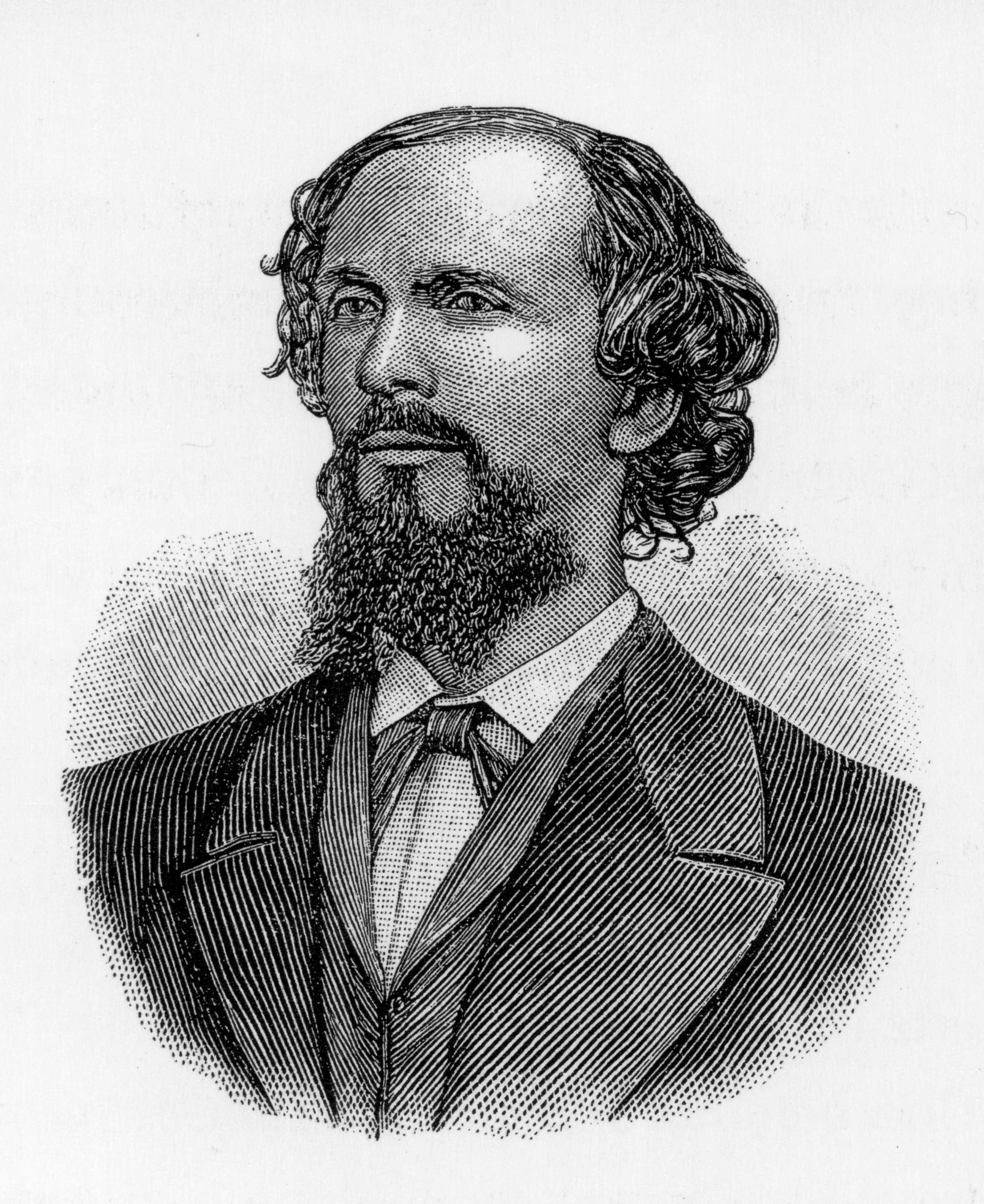
- Born: 28 August 1825; Aurich, Kingdom of Hanover, German Confederation
- Died: 14 July 1895 (aged 69); L'Aquila, Kingdom of Italy
- Occupations: lawyer, jurist, journalist, writer
- Known for: Campaigning for gay rights; promoting Living Latin

Karl Heinrich Ulrichs (28 August 1825 – 14 July 1895) was a German lawyer, jurist, journalist, sexologist, and proponent of Living Latin. He is today regarded as a pioneer of sexology and the modern gay rights movement. Ulrichs has been described as the "first gay man in world history", and separately as "probably the most famous proponent of Living Latin."

== Early life ==
Ulrichs was born in the East Frisian village of Westerfeld, incorporated today within Aurich, which at the time was in the Kingdom of Hanover. His father was an architect who died when Ulrichs was ten years old. After that he was brought up in Burgdorf by his mother's family of Lutheran pastors. Ulrichs recalled that as a youngster he felt different from other boys and was attracted by the bright colors of military uniforms and women's clothing. In 1839, at the age of fourteen, he experienced his first sexual encounter with his riding instructor. He graduated in law and theology from Göttingen University in 1846. From 1846 to 1848, he studied history at Friedrich Wilhelm University in Berlin, writing a dissertation in Latin on the Peace of Westphalia.

From 1849 to 1854, Ulrichs worked as a lawyer for the civil service in the Kingdom of Hanover. Initially he worked as an official administrative lawyer in various locations but did not enjoy the work or thrive. He transferred to the court system in 1853 and joined the bench as an assistant judge in the district court of Hildesheim. He resigned on 30 November 1854 rather than face dismissal should a possible blackmail attempt be made and his sexuality become common knowledge.

== Campaigner for sexual reform ==
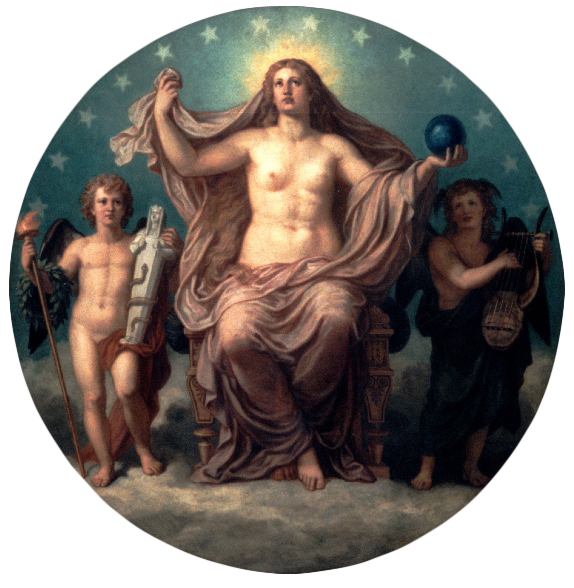
Aphrodite Urania, the goddess from whose name Ulrichs derived the term Urning for homosexuals

In 1862, Ulrichs took the momentous step of telling his family and friends that he was, in his own words, an Urning, and began writing under the pseudonym of "Numa Numantius". His first five pamphlets, collected as Forschungen über das Rätsel der mannmännlichen Liebe (Studies on the Riddle of Male-Male Love), explained such love as natural and biological, summed up with the Latin phrase anima muliebris virili corpore inclusa (a female psyche confined in a male body). In these essays, Ulrichs coined various terms to describe different sexual orientations, including Urning for a man who desires men (English "Uranian"), and Dioning for one who desires women. These terms are in reference to a section of Plato's Symposium in which two kinds of love are discussed, symbolised by an Aphrodite who is born from a male (Uranos), and an Aphrodite who is born from a female (Dione). Ulrichs also coined words for the female counterparts (Urningin and Dioningin), and for bisexuals and intersex persons.

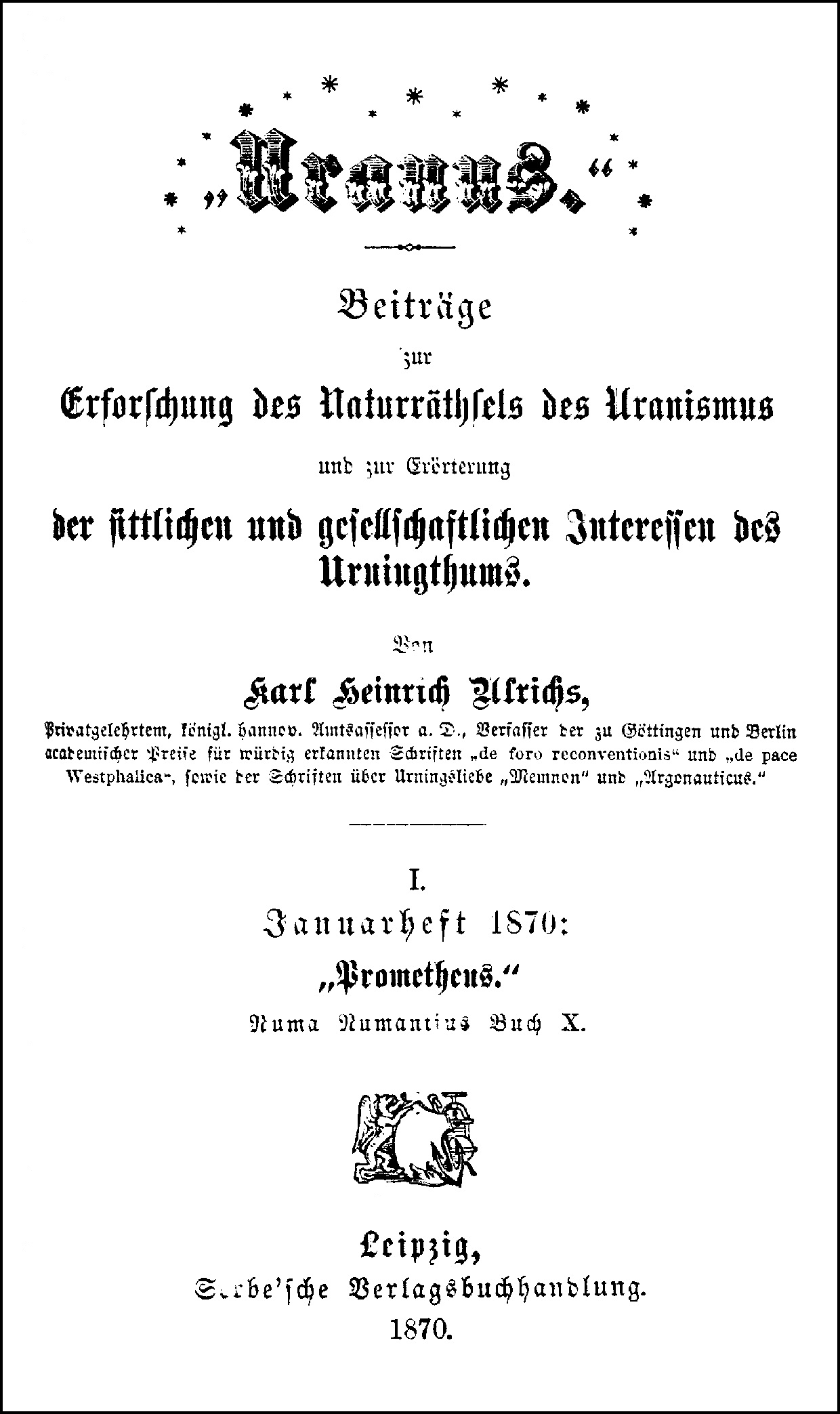
The first and only issue of Uranus (January 1870), intended by Ulrichs as a regular periodical, bears its own title: Prometheus.

In the 1860s, Ulrichs moved around Germany, always writing and publishing, and always in trouble with the law — though always for his words rather than for sexual offences. In 1864, his books were confiscated and banned by police in Saxony. Later the same thing happened in Berlin, and his works were banned throughout Prussia. Several of Ulrichs's more important works are back in print, both in German and in translation.

Ulrichs was a patriotic Hanoverian, and when Prussia annexed Hanover in 1866 he was briefly imprisoned for opposing Prussian rule and all his papers were confiscated. Some of these papers were later found in the Prussian state archives and published in 2004. On release, he was forced into exile and left Hanover for good and moved to Würzburg in Bavaria. From there, he attended the Association of German Jurists in Munich where he wished to speak on the need to reform German laws against homosexuality. His motion was banned by the presiding committee, so he took the opportunity on the final day of the conference to protest his exclusion. On 29 August 1867, Ulrichs became the first homosexual to speak out publicly in defense of homosexuality and though he was shouted down it appears that some in the audience were stirred into support for his call. Ulrichs published his account of the events in Munich as Gladius Furens, which he published under his own name and distributed to all the lawyers who had attended the event. In that pamphlet he wrote:

Until my dying day I will look back with pride that I found the courage to come face to face in battle against the spectre which for time immemorial has been injecting poison into me and into men of my nature. Many have been driven to suicide because all their happiness in life was tainted. Indeed, I am proud that I found the courage to deal the initial blow to the hydra of public contempt.

Thereafter, he began publishing his urning pamphlets under his own name as an 'urning' apologist for the cause. This makes Ulrichs quite distinct from any other writer on the subject at that time and for some time after. In 1868, the Austrian writer Karl-Maria Kertbeny coined the word "homosexual" in a letter to Ulrichs, and from the 1870s the subject of sexual orientation (in modern words) began to be widely discussed.

Later he moved to Stuttgart, where he cultivated silkworms for an income but convened a weekly discussion at a restaurant on Gymnasiumstrasse with other urning activists.

In 1879, Ulrichs published the twelfth and final pamphlet in his series on man-manly love, Critische Pfeile. Believing he had done all he could in Germany, he went into self-imposed exile in Italy shortly afterwards. For several years he travelled around the country before settling in L'Aquila.

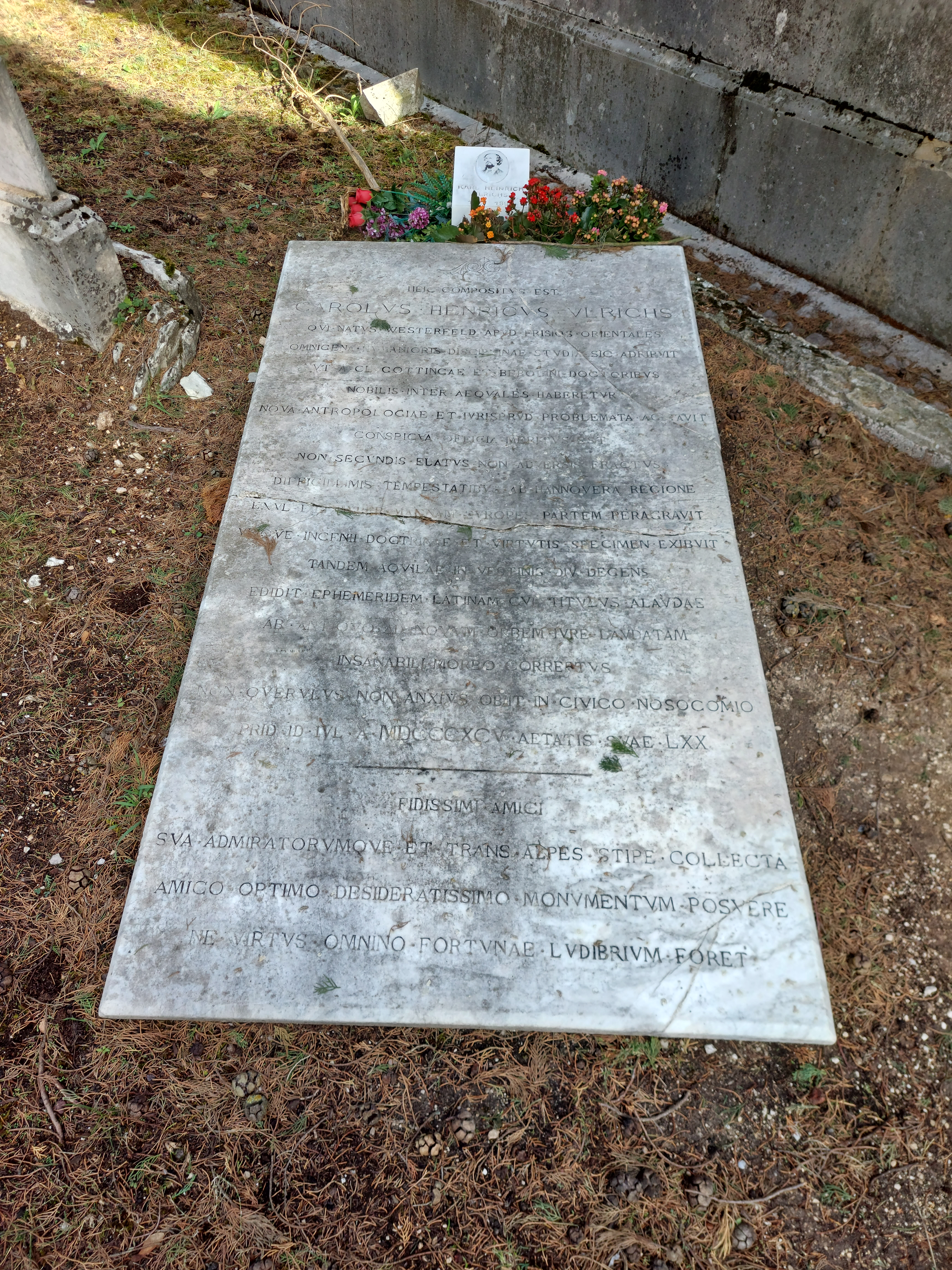
Grave of Ulrichs in Italy

He spent the last fifteen years of his life cultivating the revival of Latin as a universal language. He continued to write prolifically and publish his works (in German and Latin) at his own expense. He founded and published a Latin journal named Alaudae, which had a wide readership and which formed a community of like-minded enthusiasts for Living Latin.

In 1914, Magnus Hirschfeld claimed that Ulrichs received on his deathbed in 1895 a diploma from the University of Naples, delivered by his friend and benefactor Marquis Niccolò Persichetti (Italian article), in recognition of Ulrichs's Latin magazine Alaudae. However, Persichetti himself, writing just one year after the event in 1896, wrote that the document received by Ulrichs on his deathbed was a diploma from the Accademia Pontaniana, a learned royal society for scholars and humanists, attesting that Ulrichs had been formally enrolled into that society, on the nomination of Giovanni Antonelli (Italian article), a professor at the University of Naples.

Ulrichs died in L'Aquila on July 14, 1895. His gravestone in L'Aquila's cemetery is marked exul et pauper (in Latin), "exile and pauper." The contributors to the fundraising effort for this marble gravestone came from around the world, just like the subscribers to the Latin journal Alaudae, including New Zealand, the US, Finland, Romania and many other countries. Niccolò Persichetti gave the eulogy at his funeral. At the end of his eulogy, he said:

But with your loss, o Karl Heinrich Ulrichs, the fame of your works and your virtue will not likewise disappear... but rather, as long as intelligence, virtue, learning, insight, poetry and science are cultivated on this earth and survive the weakness of our bodies, as long as the noble prominence of genius and knowledge are rewarded, we and those who come after us will shed tears and scatter flowers on your venerated grave.

== Legacy ==
Ulrichs distributed his pamphlets widely in a pamphleteering strategy to lawyers and the medical authorities of his day. Karl Westphal, quoted Ulrichs's writings in the first psychiatric paper on 'contrary sexual feeling' and largely used Ulrichs's theoretical framework. Ulrichs also corresponded for many years with the psychiatrist, Richard von Krafft-Ebing, who later acknowledged in a letter to Ulrichs that:

From that day when you sent your writings – I believe it was in 1866 – I have turned my full attention to this phenomenon, which was just as puzzling as it was interesting to me; and it was only the knowledge of your books which motivated me to study this highly important area.

Krafft-Ebing went on to publish Psychopathia Sexualis, a foundational text in sexology. Ulrichs's influence on the emerging fields of the sexual sciences was not his only legacy though. When he started publishing his pamphlets, he received hundreds of letters from same sex attracted men, who began calling themselves 'urnings'.

Forgotten for many years, Ulrichs later became something of a cult figure in Europe in the late 1980s. There are streets named for him in Munich, Bremen, Hanover, and Berlin. His birthday is marked each year by a lively street party and poetry reading at Karl-Heinrich-Ulrichs-Platz in Munich. The city of L'Aquila has restored his grave and hosts the annual pilgrimage to the cemetery. Later gay rights advocates became aware of their debt to Ulrichs. Magnus Hirschfeld thoroughly referenced Ulrichs in his The Homosexuality of Men and Women (1914). Volkmar Sigusch called Ulrichs the "first gay man in world history."

In Ulrichs's memory, the International Lesbian and Gay Law Association presents a Karl Heinrich Ulrichs Award for distinguished contributions to the advancement of sexual equality.

In 2026, the exhibition Urning and Urningin. Language and Desire since 1864 was shown in The Hague to mark the Ulrichs' 200th 'birthday', featuring original objects by Ulrichs in dialogue with artistic works by Sharan Bala, CAConrad, Philipp Gufler, Eli Hill, KRIWET, Cosy Pièro, Rory Pilgrim, sophie serber and Louwrien Wijers.

In an interview, Robert Beachy said "I think it is reasonable to describe [Ulrichs] as the first gay person to publicly out himself."

== Latin writer ==
During his stay in Italy, he devoted himself, between 1889 and 1895, to promoting the international use of Latin by publishing the Latin journal Alaudae. The purpose of this journal was to revive Latin as a living, public language for scholarship, culture, and international communication in the contemporary world. Alaudae was widely disseminated. It popularized many European Latin poets of that time.

In publishing this journal and establishing contacts with readers and contributors, Ulrichs believed that the journal had established an international network, a global community. Ulrichs's initial intentions had been literary, but the journal had led him to discover the international dimension of Latin. Ulrichs believed in the vitality of Latin, and wanted to return the language to its rightful place as the international language of the res publica litterarum, the "republic of letters."

After Ulrichs's death, his journal Alaudae in turn influenced a similar, successor journal with a similar purpose, named Vox Urbis: de litteris et bonis artibus commentarius, published twice monthly by the architect and engineer Aristide Leonori between 1898 and 1913. A commentary in the first issue of Vox Urbis, written by Rev. Cæsar De Angelis, explicitly acknowledged the tireless and unpaid work of Karl Heinrich Ulrichs in advancing the Latin language. De Angelis identified Ulrichs's Alaudae as the first Latin journal and one of the main inspirations for Vox Urbis.

== See also ==
- List of civil rights leaders
- Paragraph 175

== Works ==
- Forschungen über das Rätsel der mannmännlichen Liebe (Max Spohr, 1898; repr. Rosa Winkel, 1994)
- The Riddle of Man-Manly Love. Trans. Michael Lombardi-Nash. 1864-1879; Prometheus Books, 1994.
- Pretsell, Douglas Ogilvy, ed. (2020). The Correspondence of Karl Heinrich Ulrichs, 1846-1894. Springer. ISBN 978-3-030-39763-0.
