= Weyer Castle =

Building in Bramberg am Wildkogel, Austria

Coordinates: 47.2608°N 12.3180°E

Burgruine Weyer
- Bramberg am Wildkogel, Salzburg, Austria
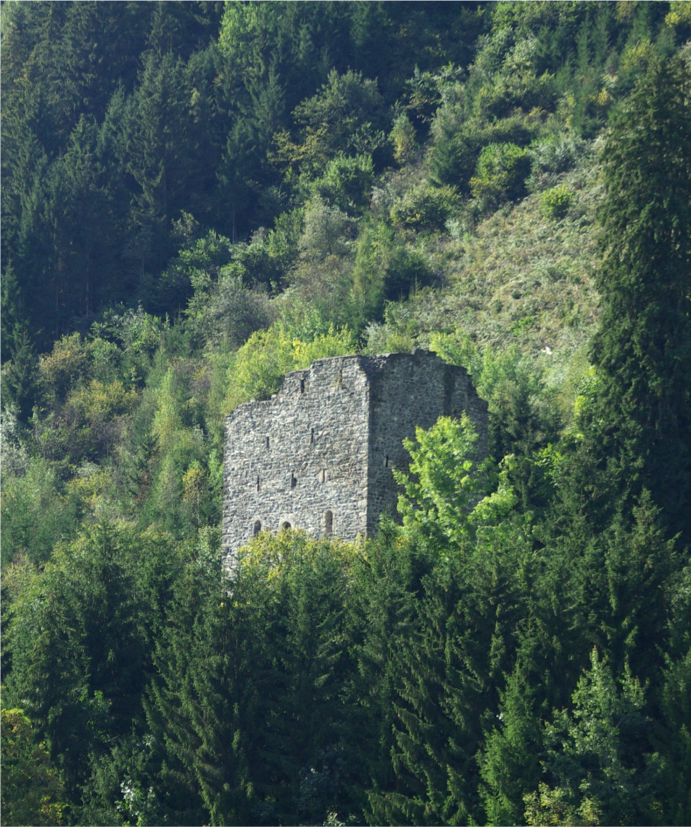

Site information
- Type: Hillside castle

Site history
- Built: 1130

The castle ruins of Weyer (German: Burgruine Weyer), also known as Weyerturm or Weyerhofburg, are the ruins of a hillside castle west of the village of Bramberg in Salzburg state, Austria. The tower is one of the last surviving examples of the small castles which were once prevalent in the Pinzgau region; the only other is the Felber Tower in Mittersill. The castle guarded the entrance to the Habachtal, where the only emerald occurrence in Europe was located. It is 816 m above sea level, approximately 25 meters above the Weyer estate).

== History ==
The first owners seem to have been the lords of Weyer; called Rapoto de Wiare (1130), Chunrad (1150), Haimo (1160) and Berthold (1169). Around 1270, the bishopric of Chiemsee seems to have come into the possession of the castle. Although aone of the Gerhoch is still called a gertop of Weyer, this last offspring from the Weyer family was already a fief of the Chiemsean bishops.

== See also ==
- List of castles in Austria
