= Marian Weygers =

American artist

Marian Weygers (November 7, 1909–September 26, 2008) was an American artist who specialized in printmaking. She was graduated from the University of California at Berkeley as an art major where she worked and studied under Chiura Obata, who taught her the ink wash painting style.

She developed an original print-making process that she named, imprints from nature, using natural materials such as flowers, leaves, and grass as well as rocks and insects. Her techniques have been adopted by many printmaking artists.

Weygers was born in San Francisco, California. She married the sculptor, Alexander Weygers, in the early 1940s. At first they lived in Berkeley, California, and later relocated to the Monterey Peninsula in the 1960s and settling into their previous retreat in Carmel Valley, which then served as their home and studios. Her husband died at the age of eighty-seven in 1989. Marian remained in Carmel Valley and was very active in environmental and civic issues until she died on September 26, 2008, at the age of ninety-eight.
