= Wyer =

Wyer is a surname. Notable persons with that name include:

- Doug Wyer (born 1947), English speedway rider
- John Wyer (1909–1989), automobile racing engineer and team manager
- Mary Wyer, Australian musician, member of indie band Even as We Speak
- Reginald Wyer (1898–1970), British cinematographer
- Russell Wyer, Australian rugby league player

== See also ==
- Wijer
- Wyers
