= Weyher =

Weyher is a surname. Notable persons with that name include:

- Harry F. Weyher Jr. (1921–2002), American lawyer
- Hein-Peter Weyher (born 1935), German Navy officer
- Kurt Weyher (1901–1991), German admiral
- Ruth Weyher (1901-1983), German actress

== See also ==
- Weyher family, a noble family
- Weyher in der Pfalz, Rheinland-Pfalz, Germany
