= Alexander Weygers =

Dutch-American artist (1901–1989)

- Alexander sits in his Carmel Valley Studio
- Born: Alexander George Weijgers; October 12, 1901; Mojokerto, Indonesia
- Died: July 23, 1989 (aged 87); Carmel Valley, California, USA
- Known for: painter, print maker, philosopher, and author
- Movement: Sustainable living

Alexander George Weygers (October 12, 1901 – July 23, 1989) was a polymath Dutch-American artist who is best known as a sculptor, painter, print maker, blacksmith, carpenter, philosopher, mechanical engineer, aerospace engineer and author.

== Biography ==
Weygers was born in Mojokerto, Dutch East Indies, where his Dutch parents, Albert Weijgers and Johanna van Leenhoff, owned and operated a sugar plantation and a hotel. His mother taught literature and several languages at a high school in Surabaya. Alex inherited his mother's linguistic talents and his father instilled a deep love of nature, design, and ecology into him as he accompanied his father on botanical explorations in Indonesia.

In 1916, his prosperous parents sent him to the Netherlands to study. First he attended a secondary school where, among other things, he studied the discipline of blacksmithing—which he often referred to as the "mother craft" of all civilization. He graduated from Groningen Politechnicum in mechanical engineering and from a Dordrecht vocational university in shipbuilding. He also briefly attended the Royal Academy of Art, The Hague. Weygers returned to Java in 1923, and his fiancée, Jacoba Hutter, joined him there from the Netherlands in 1924, where they married. Jacoba could not adjust to the tropical climate, and in November 1926 they immigrated to the United States to take residence in Seattle, where he was employed as a mechanical draughtsman. In September 1928, Jacoba died during the stillbirth of their only child due to hemorrhaging following a Caesarean section.

Devastated by the death of his wife, Weygers decided to abandon engineering for art. In July 1929, Alex took a summer class organized by the Art Institute of Seattle (the precursor of the Seattle Art Museum and unrelated to the identically named for-profit institution), studying sculpture under Avard Fairbanks. He created one of his most notable sculptures, Mourning, that caught the attention of world-renowned sculptor Lorado Taft in which he won a scholarship at Lorado Taft Midway Studios in Chicago. Following that he studied various aspects of art in the European centers that were renowned for the areas that interested him. Moving to California in the 1930s, he established a studio in Berkeley and began teaching. Alex was naturalized as a U.S. citizen in 1934.

In August 1942, he entered the U.S. Army and his command of Malay, Dutch, Italian, German, and English led to his assignment to the intelligence operations.

He received a patent from the U.S. Patent Office for his discopter in 1944 and his design has served as the prototype for other similar disk and hovering aircraft that have been developed up to the present day.

During his service in the army he was given a Carmel Valley property where, over several decades, he and his new wife, Marian, would build a retreat with a residence and studios, while he pursued his career teaching at Berkeley.

Marian Weygers, his second wife, had graduated from the University of California at Berkeley as an art major where she worked and studied under Chiura Obata, who taught her ink wash painting and design. She developed a printmaking process that she named "imprints from nature", using natural materials such as flowers, leaves, and grass as well as rocks and insects.

Alex and Marian Weygers relocated to the Monterey Peninsula in the 1960s and settled into their former retreat in Carmel Valley that then served as their home and studios. This was the location of his death at the age of eighty-seven. Marian remained very active in environmental and civic issues in Carmel Valley until her death in 2008.

== Artistic career ==
In 1937 Weygers was recognized with a solo exhibition at the Cliff Hotel in San Francisco and was featured at the Oakland Art Gallery. His work was accepted into the San Francisco Art Association (SFAA) exhibitions of 1937 and 1938.

The San Francisco Chronicle which began a discussion of Weygers by stating that they were "never given to idle flattery", stated that "Alexander Weygers as a modern Leonardo da Vinci..." and continued, "...He commands attention because he is a success by any standard of excellence in half a dozen professions... a sculptor of heroic dimensions, an inventor, a marine, mechanical, and aeronautic engineer, an artist with a camera, a designer and illustrator, and a virtuoso practitioner of endgrain half-tone wood engraving. He is also blacksmith, machinist, carpenter, electrician, plumber, toolmaker, and beekeeper. He is further a teacher and a reluctant prophet upon whom the admiring descend."

Before 1940 his work was included in the collection of the Smithsonian Institution in Washington, D.C. and was recognized as an artist of national significance.

== Discopter ==
The "Discopter" was a vertical liftoff aircraft that looked very much like what was to be later termed "flying saucer". He made numerous detailed drawings of the aircraft portrayed in various American cities - specifically, San Francisco and Chicago. He sent these detailed plans to all the branches of the U.S. Military and was eventually told that they were intrigued by the concept and the design of the craft but were not prepared at that time because the war effort superseded its development. However, he did indeed patent the design for the "Discopter" in January 1944 with the U.S. Patent Office, and it served as the prototype for other similar aircraft that have been developed up to the present day.

== Published works ==
Besides his works in sculpture, painting, photography, and wood engraving he is a published author in fields as diverse as philosophy, blacksmithing, and the creation of tools. Some of his most popular titles are The Modern Blacksmith, The Making of Tools, and The Recycling, Use, and Repair of Tools; the first is sometimes described as the bible of blacksmiths. All of these have been compiled into a publication released posthumously in 1997 with the title The Complete Modern Blacksmith.

== Philosophy ==
Weygers's philosophical view was agnostic and he asserted that "Truth" was the source of life—being defined as the forces and concise designs inherent in Nature and her works. One of his students, Peter B. Partch, states that Weygers equated Nature with the concepts of deity among human cultures, and defined Nature as "the all-encompassing truth motivating all universal unseen forces, being self-governing and creating rock, plant, and animal evolution bound". Further, he relates that Weygers advocated that one should "live life to the fullest", by which he meant doing what one desires in life "for the love of it" rather than for fame or financial gain. Through living simply, and in accordance with his philosophy, each would gain the ultimate freedom possible and produce actions and works of great merit—adhering to a discipline that included learning how to continuously reduce reliance upon material needs. Weygers advocated the reuse of waste materials cast off as useless trash by contemporary societies by adapting them to other needs or making artistic creations with them. Recycling and Sustainable living are the current terms for his concepts.

== Weygers Foundation ==
Randall Hunter founded the Weygers Foundation to create awareness and "to inspire innovation in the areas of the visual and graphic arts and self-sustainability". He died in 2017, and his efforts are documented in Ashlee Vance's 2018 article, "The Forgotten Legend of Silicon Valley’s Flying Saucer Man".
