= Louwrien Wijers =

Dutch artist and writer

Louwrien Wijers (born 1941 in Aalten, Netherlands) is a Dutch artist and writer working in Ferwert. She was involved with the Fluxus art movement and worked with Joseph Beuys from 1968 through 1986. Like Beuys, she considers writing and speaking as sculpture. She makes what she calls "mental sculpture" as well as material sculpture. From 1965 on she has written on art for the Museum Journaal, Algemeen Handelsblad, Hitweek, het Financieele Dagblad and in several international books, magazines and publications. In 1970 she began making art.

Her collection of interviews 1978–1987 with Joseph Beuys, Andy Warhol, the Dalai Lama, Robert Filliou, Sogyal Rinpoche, David Bohm, Rupert Sheldrake, Francisco Varela, Nam June Paik and Harish Johari came out in German as Schreiben als Plastik in 1992 and was published in English as Writing as Sculpture in 1996.

In 1990, Louwrien Wijers initiated her mental sculpture Art meets Science and Spirituality in a changing Economy, five days of panel meetings at the Stedelijk Museum Amsterdam. It brought together artists, scientists, spiritual leaders and economists; Robert Rauschenberg, David Bohm, the Dalai Lama and Stanislav Menshikov in Panel 1. John Cage, Ilya Prigogine, Huston Smith and Friedrich Wilhelm Christians in Panel 2. JCJ Vanderheyden, Francisco Varela, Mother Tessa Bielecki and J.M. Pinhero Neto in Panel 3. Lawrence Weiner, Rupert Sheldrake, Sogyal Rinpoche and Jean-Maxime Lêvêque in Panel 4. Marina Abramović, Fritjof Capra, Raimon Panikkar and Johan Witteveen in Panel 5. Her accurate transcripts of all five panel meetings are published in Art meets Science and Spirituality in a changing Economy / From Competition to Compassion, Academy Editions, 1996.

== Solo exhibitions ==
- 1972 Bathiliem Gallery, New York, U.S.A.
- 1973 Galerie im Goethe Institut, Amsterdam
- 1974 Galerie im Goethe Institut, Amsterdam
- 1982 Van Reekummuseum, Apeldoorn. Netherlands
- 2003 Mijn Heyboertijd met Hannes van Es, Kunstruimte Wagemans, Beetsterzwaag, Netherlands
- 2011 Words to be framed, Galerie van Gelder, Amsterdam

== Group exhibitions ==
- 1972 Galerie im Goethe Institut, Amsterdam
- 1982 ICA, Antwerpen
- 1992 Fodor Museum, Amsterdam
- 1998 Artists for Tibet, Amsterdam
- 2003 Kunstruimte Wagemans, Beesterzwaag, Netherlands
- 2003 Biennale van Venetië, Utopia Station
- 2007 Cumulus, Kunstruimte NP40, Amsterdam, curator Marieke Bolhuis
- 2008 Kasteel Nienoord, Leek, Netherlands
- 2011 Kunstruimte Wagemans, Nw Annerveen, Netherlands
- 2013 The Temptation of AA Bronson, Witte de With, Rotterdam, Netherlands
- 2013 Onmogelijke Kunst op Solder, Museum8 in Ons LieveHeer op Solder, Amsterdam
- 2014 UMCG / Universitair Medisch Centrum Groningen, Groningen, Netherlands, with Ids Willemsma
- 2015 Postcards are to be looked at, Galerie van Gelder, Amsterdam
- 2015 RongWrong/Amsterdam, solo booth at Brussels Art Fair, Brussels, Belgium
- 2015 Anarchic Situation, Kunstruimte Wagemans, Beetsterzwaag, Netherlands, curated by Marc Bijl
- 2016 Imagine Europe - In Search of New Narratives, BOZAR / Paleis voor Schone Kunsten, Brussels, Belgium
- 2017 Learn Tomorrow's Language, Amsterdamse Bos / Cure Park, Amsterdam
- 2017 Roll on, Roll on Phenomena, Van Eyck, Maastricht, curator Eloise Sweetman
- 2018 Psst... A Play On Gossip, Fondazione Giuliani, Rome, Italy
- 2019 Zeppelin Rooms, RongWrong, Amsterdam
- 2019 Moment VI: Kindness in a Time of Scarcity, Shimmer, Rotterdam

== Publications ==
- Art meets Science and Spirituality in a changing Economy, SDU Publishers, 1990 ISBN 90 12 06619 0
- Writing as Sculpture: 1978–1987. Academy Editions, 1996. ISBN 1854901842
- Ben d'Armagnac, In de serie Monografieën van Nederlandse Kunstenaars van het Prins Bernhard Fonds, Waanders Uitgevers, 1995. ISBN 90 6630 486 3
- Art Meets Science and Spirituality in a Changing Economy, From Competition to Compassion. Vch Pub, 1996. ISBN 1854904779
