= Kurnig =

Philosophical pessimist, (fl. 1894–1918)

Kurnig (fl. 1894–1918) is the pseudonym of a writer and activist who published several works in German and French on topics including anti-militarism, sexology, philosophy, and education in the late 19th and early 20th century.

== Philosophy ==
An outspoken atheist heavily influenced by the philosophical pessimism of Arthur Schopenhauer, Kurnig advocated for a complete abstention from procreation and for voluntary human extinction. After writing a number of pamphlets both in German and in French soliciting support for his campaign, Kurnig published three short books on the topic in the publishing house of Max Spohr in Leipzig, which were republished in a slightly enlarged and revised version in his 1901 main work Der Neo-Nihilismus. At the time, Kurnig's works were actively discussed in a number of scientific journals and newspapers (Note: Kurnig replied to many of his critics (in In Sachen Kurnig's Neo-Nihilismus 1900 and 1902), including reviews by the Allgemeine Zeitschrift für Psychiatrie, Medizinisch-chirurgisches Zentralblatt and Dresdner Journal (27 December 1901, p. 2536).) as well as in the early LGBT scene (including by Magnus Hirschfeld and in the Jahrbuch für sexuelle Zwischenstufen), but were mostly received negatively and were even banned in some parts of the world. (Note: Kurnig's books banned in Russia: "Börsenblatt für den Deutschen Buchhandel und die verwandten Geschäftszweige" (in German). Vol. 21. 723–725. 26 January 1900. "Börsenblatt für den Deutschen Buchhandel und die verwandten Geschäftszweige" (in German). Vol. 22. 757. 27 January 1900.) However, Francis Ronsin argues that Kurnig had an influence on the French neo-Malthusian movement, especially on Marie Huot.

Kurnig is now considered to be one of the first modern antinatalists.

== Educational project ==
Through a series of "Correspondences", which were sent out first from Karlsruhe, Germany, later from Zürich, Switzerland, and distributed around the world, Kurnig also campaigned for pacifism and for the creation of an "international Educational Consulting Centre":

The international Educational Consulting Centre will consist of delegates – two or three teachers (or persons interested in education) from each State, chosen by the Government and the teaching profession; they will devote themselves to the most careful examination of all matters connected with education and will issue printed reports of their discussions, – always however in the spirit of an attempt at international agreement and concord.

Along with people like Herman Molkenboer, who proposed a similar idea, and Ferenc Kemény (sports manager), with whom Kurnig personally corresponded, Kurnig is recognized as one of the forerunners of the UNESCO International Bureau of Education.

== Works ==
- (as Quartus:) Völkerbund, nicht: Völkerkrieg. Ein Blick in die pädagogische Anarchie der Gegenwart zugleich als Beitrag zur nihilistischen Weltanschauung (im Sinne Schopenhauers). Basel: Schweizerische Verlags-Druckerei 1894. 40 pp. (Scan available at MDZ)
- Entvölkerung der Erde. Das Nichtsein nach dem Tode. Ein neu-nihilistisches Glaubensbekenntnis und Programm. 1896. 4 pp.
- Nouvelle Appréciation de l'Instinct Sexuel (Pessimisme – Jurisprudence – Psychiatrie). 1896. 12 pp. (Scan available at HU Berlin) — includes:
  - Philosophie Pratique : Principes de nihilisme humanitaire. Néo-Nihilisme. 1896. 4 pp.
- Das Sexualleben und der Pessimismus. Leipzig: Max Spohr 1897. II + 46 pp. (Scan available at SLUB Dresden)
- Das Sexualleben und der Pessimismus. II. Neue Beiträge zu Kurnig's Neo-Nihilismus. Dialoge und Fragmente. Leipzig: Max Spohr 1898. II + 45 pp. (Scan available at SLUB Dresden)
- Der Pessimismus der Anderen. Pessimistische „Geflügelte Worte“ und Citate. Leipzig: Max Spohr 1899. VIII + 28 pp. (Scan available at SLUB Dresden)
- In Sachen: Kurnig's Neo-Nihilismus 1900. 19 pp. (Scan available at SLUB Dresden)
- Der Neo-Nihilismus. Anti-Militarismus – Sexualleben (Ende der Menschheit.). 2. vermehrte Auflage. Leipzig: Max Spohr 1901. VIII + 192 pp. (in Fraktur) — contains:
  - Völkerbund, nicht: Völkerkrieg (1894) (= Anti-Militarismus)
  - Das Sexualleben und der Pessimismus I (1897)
  - Das Sexualleben und der Pessimismus II (1898)
  - In Sachen: Kurnig's Neo-Nihilismus 1900
  - Der Pessimismus der Anderen (1899)
- Der Neo-Nihilismus. Anti-Militarismus – Sexualleben (Ende der Menschheit.). 2. vermehrte Auflage. Leipzig: Max Sängewald / Heilbronn: Schell'sche Buchdruckerei, Viktor Kraemer 1903. VIII + 192 + 32 pp. — contains:
  - Der Neo-Nihilismus (1901)
  - In Sachen Kurnig's Neo-Nihilismus. Kritik und Replik 1902
- Internationale Ratgebende Pädagogische Centralstelle (Entwurf Kurnig, 1904) / Centre Consultant Pédagogique international (Projet Kurnig, 1904). Heilbronn: Schell'sche Buchdruckerei, Viktor Kraemer. 18 pp.
- Correspondenzen / Correspondances. Karlsruhe: Doering'sche Buchdruckerei / Zürich: Jean Frey, ca. 1907–1918.

== See also ==
- Antinatalism
- Marie Huot
- Philosophical pessimism
