= Ernst Burchard =

German sexologist (1876–1920)

Ernst Otto Burchard (9 September 1876 – 5 February 1920) was a German physician, sexologist, and gay rights advocate and author. Burchard, who was gay, testified as an expert witness in several court cases involving prosecutions on grounds of Paragraph 175, which criminalized homosexual practices.

== Early life ==
Burchard was born in Heilsberg (modern Lidzbark Warmiński, Warmian-Masurian Voivodeship). He studied medicine in Tübingen, Würzburg and Kiel, taking his doctoral degree in 1900 with a dissertation on Einige Fälle von vorübergehender Glycosurie. After his studies, he worked as a physician in Berlin and opened his own practice. Here he met Dr. Magnus Hirschfeld and joined him to found the Scientific-Humanitarian Committee along with the pastor Georg Plock and Baron Hermann von Teschenberg.

== Gay rights activism ==
Burchard had a successful career in medicine. After several years as a general practitioner in Berlin, he assisted Hirschfeld in starting the Scientific Humanitarian Committee with publisher Max Spohr, lawyer Eduard Oberg and writer Max von Bülow. The group aimed to undertake research to defend the rights of homosexuals and to repeal Paragraph 175, the section of the German penal code that had criminalized homosexual acts between men since 1871. They argued that the law encouraged blackmail, and the motto of the Committee, "Justice through science", reflected Hirschfeld's belief that a better scientific understanding of homosexuality would eliminate hostility toward homosexuals. Hirschfeld was a tireless campaigner and became a well-known public figure.

Benedict Friedländer and some others left the Scientific Humanitarian Committee and formed another group, the "Bund für männliche Kultur" or "Union for Male Culture", which however did not exist long. It argued that male-male love is a simple aspect of virile manliness rather than a special condition.

The Scientific-Humanitarian Committee, under Hirschfeld's leadership, managed to gather over 5000 signatures from prominent Germans for a petition to overturn Paragraph 175. Signatories included Albert Einstein, Hermann Hesse, Käthe Kollwitz, Thomas Mann, Heinrich Mann, Rainer Maria Rilke, August Bebel, Max Brod, Karl Kautsky, Stefan Zweig, Gerhart Hauptmann, Martin Buber, Richard von Krafft-Ebing and Eduard Bernstein.

The bill was brought before the Reichstag in 1898, but was only supported by a minority from the Social Democratic Party of Germany, prompting a frustrated Hirschfeld to consider the controversial strategy of "outing" — that is, forcing some of the prominent lawmakers who had remained silent out of the closet. The bill continued to come before parliament, and eventually began to make progress in the 1920s before the takeover of the Nazi party obliterated any hopes for reform.

He and Hirschfeld co-authored several articles on sexology. In 1913, Burchard published his books Zur Psychologie der Selbstbezichtigung and Der sexuelle Infantilismus, and in 1914 he published his Lexikon des gesamten Sexuallebens. Burchard also wrote lyric poems for the gay periodicals Der Eigene and Jahrbuch für sexuelle Zwischenstufen, including the poem "Vivat Fridericus". Burchard died on 5 February 1920, in Berlin and was buried at the Luisenfriedhof cemetery.

== Works ==
- Der sexuelle Infantilismus (with editor Magnus Hirschfeld), Halle a. S. : Marhold, 1913.
- Zur Psychologie der Selbstbezichtigung, Adler-Verlag, Berlin, 1913.
- Lexikon des gesamten Sexuallebens, Adler-Verlag, Berlin, 1914.

== Tribute ==
The German director Rosa von Praunheim made the film Der Einstein des Sex in 1999, based on the life of Magnus Hirschfeld.

== See also ==
- Harden–Eulenburg Affair, a major affair in Germany in 1907–1909 regarding accusations of homosexuality in high circles
- Magnus Hirschfeld Medal, awarded to outstanding sexologists by the German sexology society
- Arnold Aletrino- researcher and cofounder of the Dutch chapter of The Scientific Humanitarian Committee
- Hirschfeld Eddy Foundation, a Human Rights Foundation for Lesbians and Gays
