= Georg Plock =

German pastor

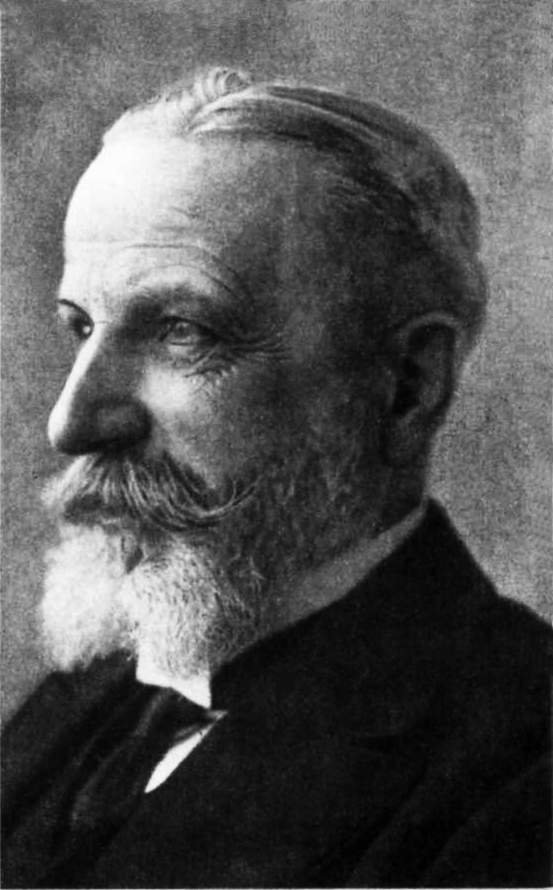

Georg Plock (1865–1930) was a former pastor and a gay rights advocate from Germany.

== Life ==
Plock studied Protestant theology, becoming a parish pastor. He was later discovered having a homosexual affair and arrested and sentenced to prison. After his imprisonment, liberal politician and pastor Friedrich Naumann asked Magnus Hirschfeld to "look after him".

From 1919 to 1923, he was the chief secretary for the Scientific-Humanitarian Committee and had worked along with the physician Ernst Burchard and Baron Hermann von Teschenberg. In 1923, he took over as editor of the homosexual journal Die Freundschaft (Friendship).
