= Bruno Vogel =

German pacifist and writer (1898–1987)

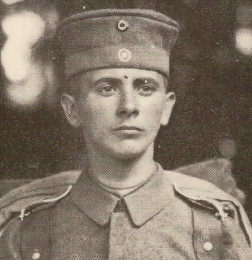
Bruno Vogel, 1917

Bruno Vogel (29 September 1898 – 5 April 1987) was a German pacifist and writer.

== Biography ==
Bruno Vogel was born on 29 September 1898 in Leipzig. He spent his childhood in Bohemia. In 1916, he fought in the First World War, first on the border of the Austro-Hungarian empire, then in the Baltic, and in Flanders by 1917.

In 1922, he founded the gay group Gemeinschaft Wir ("We the Community") under the aegis of Magnus Hirschfeld. It was the local chapter in Leipzig of the Scientific-Humanitarian Committee, one of the largest gay groups in Germany from 1896 to 1933. In the mid-20s, after his parents put him out on the streets for being gay, he moved to Berlin, and he founded the Revolutionary Pacifists Group with Kurt Hiller. In 1928, he became a member of the Social Democratic Party, but soon left.

In 1938, he moved to Cape Town, South Africa with Otto Bohlmann. From 1942 to 1944, he worked in the South African Army. Later, he wrote for Forward, Common Sense and Jewish Affairs. In 1953, he moved to London, from where he was involved in the anti-apartheid movement.

He died on 5 April 1987 in London. His novel Alf from 1929 was first translated into English in 1992.

In August 2012, someone put Bruno Vogel's unpublished works, such as the novel Mashango and the short stories he had collected under the title Slegs vir Blankes ("Only for Whites"), on the Internet anonymously.

== Bibliography ==
- Es lebe der Krieg! ("Long Live War!") [1924]
- Ein Gulasch und andere Skizzen ("A Goulash and other Sketches") (1928)
- Alf (1929) [English translation by Samuel B. Johnson, GMP Publishers Ltd., 1992]
- Mashango
- Slegs vir Blankes ("Only for Whites")

== See also ==
- List of peace activists
