= Eugène Wilhelm =

French lawyer and sexologist (1866–1951)

Eugene Wilhelm
- Born: 19 March 1866; Strasbourg, France
- Died: 23 October 1951 (aged 85); Strasbourg, France

Eugène Wilhelm in French, or in German Eugen Wilhelm (Strasbourg, 1866–1951) was a French-German lawyer and sexologist.

== Early life ==
Wilhelm was born in Strasbourg in a Protestant family. Between 1885 and 1890 he studied law in Strasbourg. In 1890 he took his doctoral degree (Dr.iur). After his studies, he worked as a judge in Strasbourg. He resigned 1908 to avoid a homosexuality scandal. After World War I he worked as a lawyer in Strasbourg until 1948.

== Sexuality rights activism ==
Wilhelm published more than 100 articles in various French and German journals under his own name, but mainly under his pseudonym ('Numa Praetorius') and for example in German magazine Jahrbuch für sexuelle Zwischenstufen of the Scientific-Humanitarian Committee in Berlin.

== Main publications ==
=== As Eugène Wilhelm or Eugen Wilhelm ===
In German

Books

- Eugen Wilhelm: Das Moment der Rechtswidrigkeit bei der Beleidigung. Strasbourg, Heitz & Mündel, 1890, 83 p.
- Eugen Wilhelm: Die rechtliche Stellung der (körperlichen) Zwitter: de lege lata und de lege ferenda, Halle, Karl Marhold, 1909.
- Eugen Wilhelm: Die französische Gerichtsorganisation mit besonderer Berücksichtigung des Schwurgerichts. Geschichtliche Entwicklung und jetziger Zustand, Stuttgart, Ferdinand Enke, 1911.

Articles

- Eugen Wilhelm: « G. Tarde, „La philosophie pénale.“ ». Zeitschrift für die gesamte Strafrechtswissenschaft, vol. 15, 1895, p. 357-371.
- Eugen Wilhelm: « Die Revision des Dreyfussprozesses ». Deutsche Juristen-Zeitung, vol. 3, 1898, p. 307.
- Eugen Wilhelm: « Ein Fall von Homosexualität (Androgynie) », Archiv für kriminal-anthropologie und Kriminalistik, vol. 14, 1904, p. 57-74.
- Eugen Wilhelm: « Homosexuelle Pissoirinschriften aus Paris », Anthropophyteia, vol. 8, 1911, p. 410-22.
- Eugen Wilhelm: « Die Behandlung der minderjährigen Prostituierten in Frankreich, insbesondere nach dem Gesetz vom 11. April 1908 » Zeitschrift für gesamte Strafrechtswissenschaft, vol. 33, 1911, p. 406-41.

In French

Articles

- Eugène Wilhelm: 'L’hermaphrodite et le droit (De lege lata et de lege ferenda)', Revue d’anthropologie criminelle, 1911, p. 267-94.
- Eugène Wilhelm: 'Publications allemandes sur les questions sexuelles', Archives d’anthropologie criminelle, 1912, p. 301-309.
- Eugène Wilhelm: 'L'application en Alsace et Lorraine des lois françaises non introduites'. Revue juridique d'Alsace et de Lorraine, vol 1, n°1, 1920, pp. 3–40.
- Eugène Wilhelm: 'Les Alsaciens-Lorrains et la question de la nationalité', Revue juridique d’Alsace et de Lorraine, vol. 1, n°. 11, 1920, p. 448-57.
- Eugène Wilhelm: 'Les lois françaises promulguées depuis l’Armistice sont-elles, sans autre condition, applicables en Alsace et en Lorraine ?', Revue juridique d’Alsace et de Lorraine, vol. 2, 1921, p. 438-61.
- Eugène Wilhelm: 'Les conflits de compétence entre les tribunaux d’Alsace-Lorraine et les autres tribunaux français', Revue juridique d’Alsace et de Lorraine, vol. 3, 1922, p. 133-36.
- Eugène Wilhelm: 'A propos d’un arrêt du Tribunal d’Empire de Leipzig: Les personnes qui avaient acquis l’ancien indigénat d’Alsace-Lorraine et ne sont pas devenus françaises, sont elles restées allemandes ?', Revue juridique d’Alsace et de Lorraine, vol. 8, 1928, p. 616-19.
- Eugène Wilhelm: 'Quelques questions relatives au fonds de commerce', Revue juridique d’Alsace et de Lorraine, vol. 11, 1930, p. 609-35.

=== As Numa Praetorius ===
In German

Book

- Numa Praetorius: Das Liebesleben Ludwigs XIII. von Frankreich, Bonn, A.Marcus & E.Weber, 1920.

Articles

- Numa Praetorius: 'Der Prozess gegen Georges Eekhoud wegen seines Romanes Escal-Vigor', Jahrbuch für sexuelle Zwischenstufen, vol. 3, 1901, p. 520-25.

In French

Articles

- Numa Praetorius, 'A propos de l’article du Dr Laupts sur l’Homosexualité dans les Archives du 15 avril 1908', Archives d’anthropologie criminelle, vol. 23, 1909, p. 198-208.
- Numa Praetorius: 'A propos de l’homosexualité en Allemagne', Archives d’anthropologie criminelle, 1912, p. 114-16.
