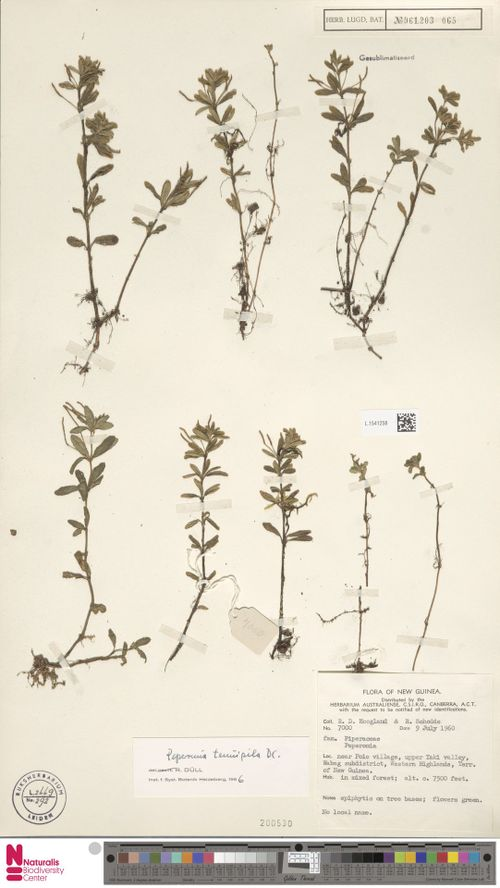

Scientific classification
- Kingdom: Plantae
- Clade: Tracheophytes
- Clade: Angiosperms
- Clade: Magnoliids
- Order: Piperales
- Family: Piperaceae
- Genus: Peperomia
- Species: P. tenuipila

Binomial name
- Peperomia tenuipila C.DC.

= Peperomia tenuipila =

Species of plant

Peperomia tenuipila is a species of plant in the genus Peperomia found in New Guinea. It primarily grows on wet tropical biomes. Its conservation status is Not Threatened.

== Taxonomy and naming ==
It was described in 1914 by Casimir de Candolle in Nova Guinea, from specimens collected by Lucien von Römer in 1909. It gets its name from Tenui + pila, which means Thin hairs.

== Distribution and habitat ==
It is endemic to Indonesia. It grows on wet tropical biomes.

== Conservation ==
This species is listed as Not Threatened but with a low confidence under the Angiosperm Extinction Risk Predictions v1.
