= Richard Linsert =

German sexologist, psychologist and activist (1899 - 1933)

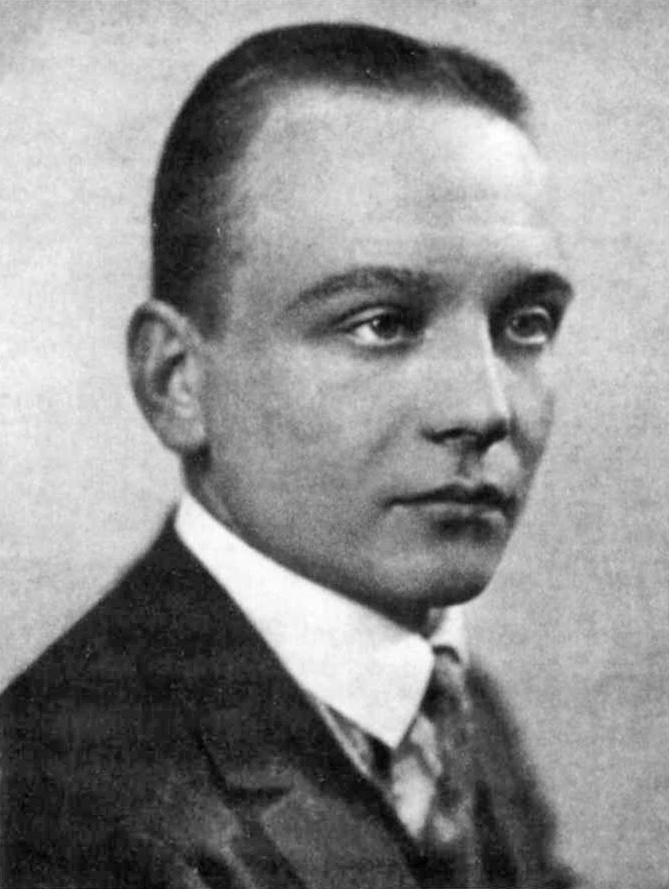
Richard Linsert

Richard Christian Carl Linsert (17 November 1899 – 3 February 1933) was a German sexologist, psychologist and activist.

== Career ==
Richard Linsert was born in to the family of a middle-class businessman. After graduating from commercial school he became a member of the Communist Party of Germany. He was an active member of the KPD's intelligence service, the AM-Apparat.

At the age of 22, he became involved in establishing a homosexual association in Munich, a local branch of the “German Friendship Association - Association for Human Rights”. However, it failed due to the repressive attitude of the Bavarian authorities towards the association. In Munich he met and befriended Kurt Hiller, who gave him a job as an assistant secretary in Magnus Hirschfeld's Scientific-Humanitarian Committee (WhK). From 1926 he was secretary of the Scientific and Humanitarian Committee. He became an expert in sexual science topics and wrote the counter-draft to the draft sexual criminal law of 1927. It was thanks to Linsert's commitment to sexual politics that the KPD is the only political party in the Weimar Republic to share the WhK's demand for the abolition of Paragraph 175.

In December 1929, Linsert left the Scientific-Humanitarian Committee and founded the Archive for Sexual Science with the doctors Max Hodann, Bernd Götz and the lawyer Fritz Flato, but it hardly achieved any great importance. Nevertheless, in 1929 and 1930 he wrote books about contraception and aphrodisiacs together with Magnus Hirschfeld. He also published an anthology on male prostitution in 1929. In 1931, Linsert published a Monograph Kabale und Liebe. Peter Limann, the second secretary of the Scientific and Humanitarian Committee, was considered his life partner.

Linsert died in February 1933 of delayed pneumonia in the Stubenrauch Hospital in Berlin-Lichterfelde
