= Eva Siewert =

German journalist, writer, radio announcer and opera singer (1907–1994)

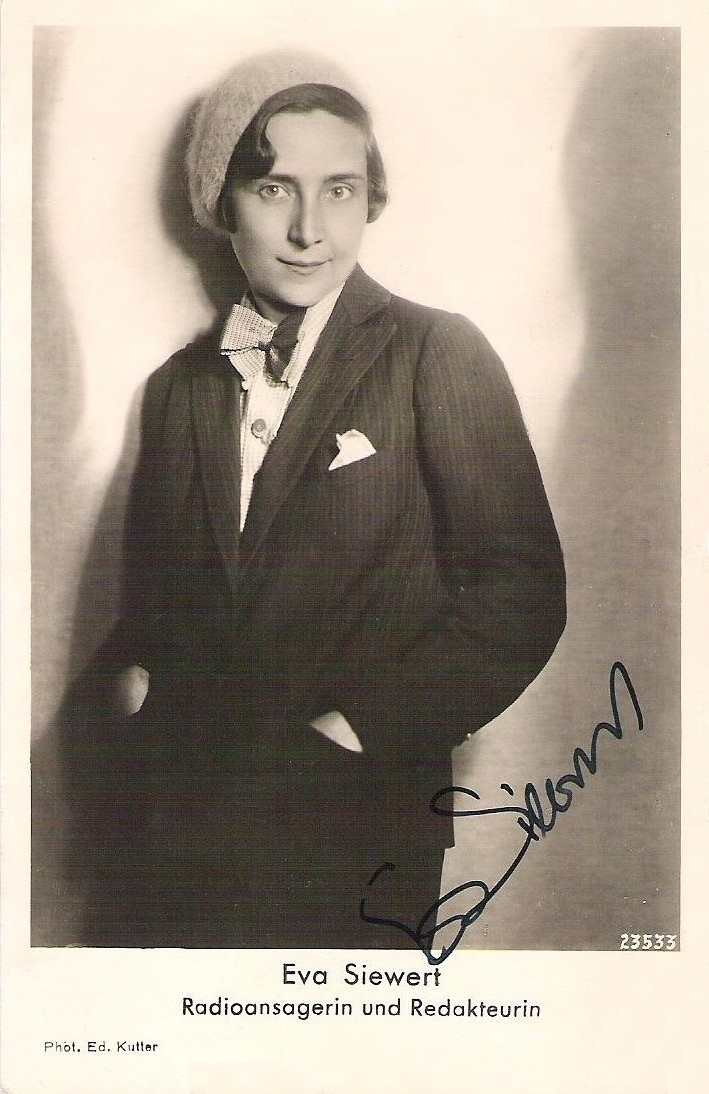
Eva Siewert, Signed Photograph

Eva Siewert (11 February 1907 – 3 December 1994) was a German journalist, writer, radio announcer and opera singer, who lived and worked mainly in Berlin.

== Childhood ==
Eva Siewert was born in Breslau (today Wrocław, Poland), the daughter of two musicians. Her father Hans Siewert (1872–1941), son of a chemistry professor at the University of Córdoba (Argentina), was a Kammersänger. He became a member of the Nazi Party in 1932. Her mother Frida Siewert (born Michels, 1880–1953) was an opera and concert singer and a Jew, which is why her daughter later acquired the status of a "first-degree hybrid". Hans Siewert and Frida Siewert divorced in Hamburg in 1911.

Siewert lived mostly with her mother in Berlin, but was raised by governesses. She attended the Hohenzollern lyceum in Berlin-Wilmersdorf, graduating in 1923 with a high school diploma (Obersekundarreife). Her schooling was interrupted only once, in 1915, for about a year and half. At the age of eight, Siewert later explained, she fled her mother and went to live with her father, who at the time was employed as a Kammersänger for the Grand Duchy of Baden in the city of Karlsruhe. It was only through a court order that she was forced to return to Berlin. Her relationship with her mother seems to have been poor in her early years. In 1948, Siewert wrote about her mother: "We have little in common apart from music."

== Early career ==
After graduating from high school, Siewert studied music, first with her mother, and then at the Berlin School of Music (see Berlin University of the Arts). Here, she attended opera classes with Franz Ludwig Hörth (1883–1934), then director of the Berlin State Opera on Unter den Linden. She studied music theory with the composer Heinz Tiessen (1887–1971). From 1928, Siewert spent a season performing as a coloratura soprano at the Landestheater Oldenburg, but had to give it up due to illness. Asthmatic complaints made a public career as a singer impossible.

As a result, Siewert shifted her main occupation to journalism from 1929. In 1928, she became a member of the Social Democratic Party of Germany (in the local branch of Berlin-Halensee), but was at best only involved in party politics until 1930. Apparently she was at risk of acute unemployment during this period and suffered under an insecure job situation. Nothing is known today about Siewert's personal situation or milieu in Berlin in the 1920s. Only once, in a letter to the publicist Kurt Hiller (1885–1972) in 1957, did she mention that she had been friends with George Grosz' family since childhood.

Siewert moved to Tehran in 1930, where she worked for a German export and import company. Her time abroad equipped her with good foreign language skills, and when Siewert returned to Germany a year later, she gave the first radio lectures about her travel experiences. Her voice impressed listeners, so in 1932, she was nominated by the International Radio Service Berlin for the post of a German-speaking announcer at Radio Luxemburg. From 1 July 1932 to 31 March 1938, she held a well-remunerated position as editor-in-chief and trilingual (German, English, French) head spokeswoman for the station.

Siewert later wrote about her work for Radio Luxemburg: "During my time there I influenced almost every department of the broadcaster and was involved with program compilations, musical rehearsals, building up the record archive, library, and card indexes, as well as with the news services, translations, writing lectures on all kinds of topics, and the continuous announcement service in three languages. The station had a strong anti-fascist tendency." According to Siewert, she was perceived by the public as the "voice of Radio Luxembourg", while in Germany she was suspected of being an "enemy" because of her work abroad and alleged "propaganda" against Nazism.

== Persecution during the Nazi period ==
In 1938, fearing the threat of war, Siewert decided to return to Tehran. She had to go back to Berlin first, however, in order to get a visa. This was denied to her due to her journalistic work, so she was "trapped" in Germany from that time on. Since Siewert was considered a "half-Jew" in the Nazi terminology, she was banned from working on broadcast radio or in the press and subsequently had to be content with less well-endowed positions as a typist and translator. It was probably in one of these jobs that she met her future girlfriend Alice Carlé (1902–1943).

In May 1941, Siewert was arrested for the first time and taken into protective custody. The reason for the arrest was a series of incriminating letters discovered during a search at the home of her friend Kläre Beier in Bielefeld. In her letters, Siewert had repeated anti-fascist jokes she had heard among friends. A few months later, she was fined for violating the Treachery Act of 1934. Later that same year, after taking up a new position at the German legal publisher, an incident occurred that not only resulted in her immediate dismissal, but also a prison sentence: Siewert was denounced by two work colleagues for the seditious offence of "undermining the military force" (Wehrkraftzersetzung). Again, it related to jokes Siewert had told. In early September 1942, she was again sentenced under the Treachery Act – this time to nine months in prison.

In the judgement of 4 September 1942, it contemptuously stated: "The outward appearance of the accused is predominantly Jewish." It was also stated that Siewert's relationship with one of the two work colleagues who denounced her had "an erotic element", but that since summer 1941, a certain estrangement had occurred. Apparently, these hints of a possible same-sex relationship between the two women were not a disadvantage for Siewert; their effect was rather that the witness was classified as not very credible. In general, the court seemed convinced that the woman had repeatedly made incorrect or invalid statements. However, these qualifications were not enough to exonerate Siewert. Siewert served her prison sentence from 1 March to 1 December 1943 in the Berlin Barnimstrasse women's prison, not far from Alexanderplatz. After an official medical examination, she was exempted from deployment to work crews outside Berlin because of her already compromised health, but was nevertheless assigned to "easier" jobs such as cable testing for AEG and the so-called "Aschinger taskforce". This was a work crew in the Aschinger bread factory on the corner of Prenzlauer Allee and Saarbrücker Straße, in which the prisoners were used to clean vegetables, produce canned goods and similar activities. When Siewert was finally released from prison, her health was in shambles. For the remainder of the Second World War, she was primarily engaged in illegal work, she later reported, because due to her record as a political criminal, no company would keep her on for more than three months at a time.

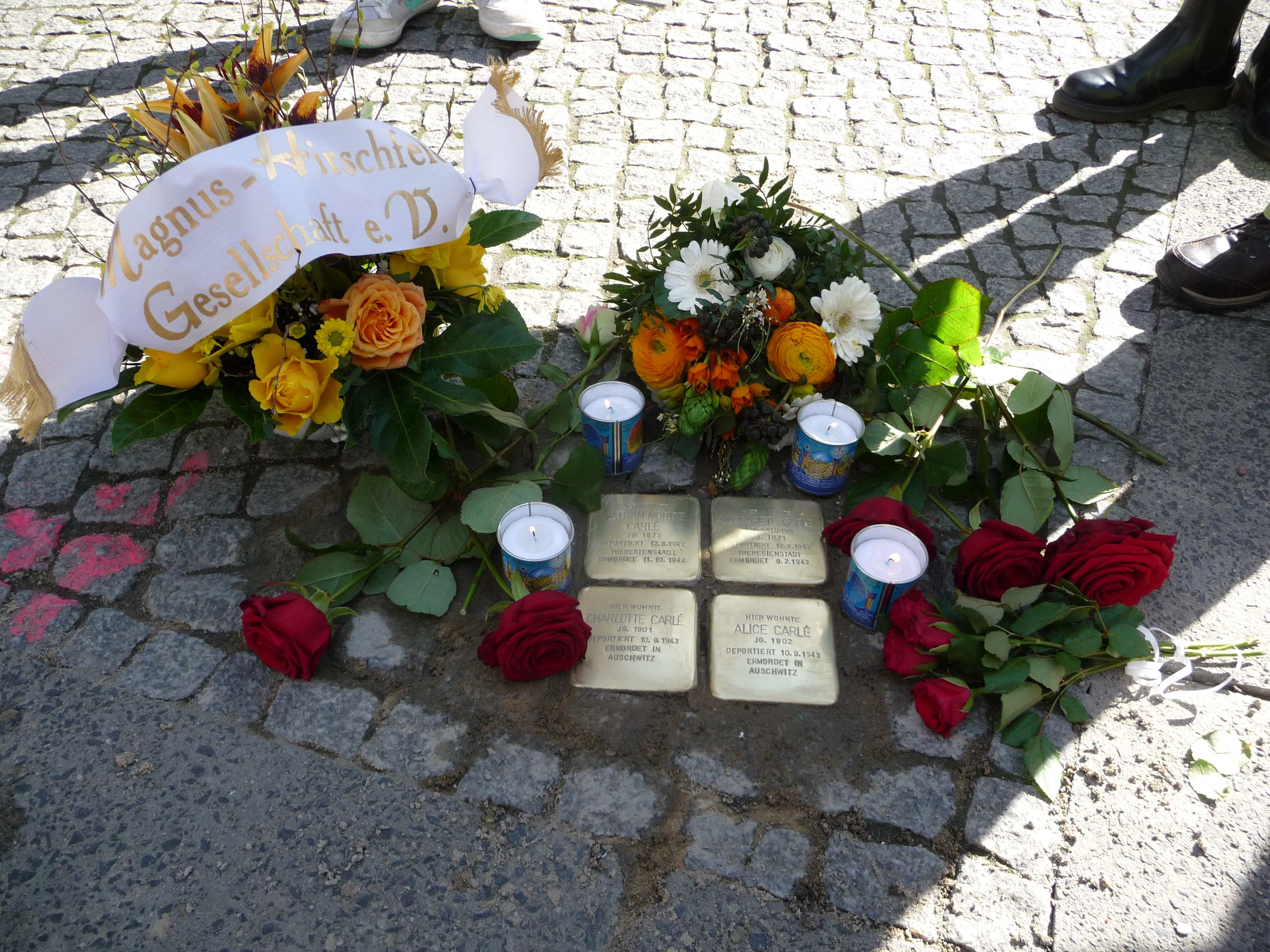
Stolpersteine for the Carlé family, Berlin, 2017

Siewert's imprisonment had fatal consequences not only for herself, but even more so for her girlfriend Alice Carlé. Carlé had stayed in Siewert's apartment several times before 1943 because she felt safe there, but during Siewert's imprisonment she was deprived of this crucial sanctuary from National Socialist surveillance. On 27 August 1943, Alice Carlé and her sister Charlotte Carlé (1901–1943) were arrested by the Gestapo and soon thereafter deported to Auschwitz, where they were both murdered that same year.

== Postwar period ==
From her arrest in 1943 (at the latest) onwards, Siewert suffered from severe cardiovascular disease, which escalated to a heart attack in 1949 and necessitated constant medical care. Especially during the nine months she spent in Barnimstrasse Women's Prison, her health deteriorated significantly. In one accident she suffered a concussion, which remained untreated, and from then on endured recurrent dizziness with nausea. She also suffered temporary hearing loss as a result of cysts on her eardrum. Siewert described her health complaints as "clear proof of her unbearable life among Germans".

Overall, Germany was a "country of torment" for her, and she even viewed the so-called economic miracle with scepticism, especially after an anonymous note saying "Long live Germany!" was once stuck to her door by neighbours. Siewert regarded many of her fellow Germans as "unreformable", and in her correspondence with Kurt Hiller she fatalistically complained: "It makes no sense as a reasonable person to try to steer this insane ship with a hostile crew, surrounded by the shadows of the costly dead" and "One should let those who neither deserve nor desire anything better simply go under." She cynically asked why this "Volk" (people) developed a reputation as being composed of poets and thinkers. Siewert humorously described herself as an "all-rounder".

After 1945, Siewert was never able to continue her professional successes from before 1938. She was recognized as a political victim by the main Committee for the Victims of Fascism (Ausschuss für die Opfer des Faschismus) and due to her health problems received a so-called "severely injured" ID card given to people disabled during the war. She supplemented her meagre monthly pension through freelance journalism, writing for Die Weltbühne, Der Sozialdemokrat, Der Spiegel, the Telegraf and Die Andere Zeitung, to name a few. To date, however, only a few dozen publications by Siewert have been identified. Evidently, Siewert's essays, features, reviews and polemics were largely lost in day-to-day business. The author left only scattered traces in the history of German-language journalism. A comprehensive bibliography on her work remains to be compiled.

== Work as a writer ==
Siewert discussed her relationship with Alice Carlé as well as Carlé’s deportation and her own denunciation and subsequent detention in the autobiographical story "The Oracle" (Das Orakel). Although she does not explicitly speak of love here, it becomes clear that the "friendship" between the first-person narrator and "Alice" (a surname is not mentioned) is very close. The two women desperately plan to emigrate from Germany together for years until one day the narrator is arrested. Siewert's moving story "The Boat Pan" (Das Boot Pan), on the other hand, deals with the feelings of estrangement and loneliness that haunt the (this time) male first-person narrator when he faces the past and the painful loss of two friends, "about whose death nobody knew anything concrete" – the girls "had no grave", the story explains. Even though National Socialism, Auschwitz and the Shoah are not mentioned, it can be interpreted that the two friends were based closely on the Carlé sisters.

With her longer manuscripts, Siewert was largely unsuccessful. The book she wrote about her prison stay at 10 Barnimstrasse has never been published. Her extended manuscript for a book on lesbian love has likewise never been published. In the letters exchanged between Siewert and Kurt Hiller in the year 1950, no working title was mentioned, but the book was repeatedly described as being about "gynephilia in women".

More encouraging was the reception of the comedy play How Does Potiphar Behave? (Wie verhält sich Potiphar), which premiered in Baden-Baden in the presence of the author in December 1949. Siewert found the performance by the artistic director Hannes Tannert (1900–1976) "outstanding in every respect" and "first class". She was also pleased with the "fairly good" response the comedy received despite its philosophical tendency. The play did not pay off financially for Siewert, however, and there were no further performances in other theatres after the premiere. Siewert's second comedy, On Wednesday at Five (Am Mittwoch um fünf, 1955), was immediately accepted by the theatre section of the publishing house S. Fischer Verlag, but was apparently never performed.

After 1945, Siewert again wrote contributions for the radio, as surviving documentation shows. For example, on 19 March 1957, to mark the "Day of Brotherhood", the Berlin broadcaster RIAS replayed a radio version of the story "Watchman" (Wächter) written by Siewert. On 12 July 1970, the Bavarian radio station Bayerische Rundfunk broadcast a documentary feature by Siewert under the title Japan, Tatamis and White Waterfalls (Japan, Tatamis und weiße Wasserfälle).

== Correspondence with Kurt Hiller ==
The correspondence between Siewert and the publicist and homosexual activist Kurt Hiller was abundant, especially up to the beginning of 1950. Only then did a period of silence of several years ensue, precipitated by Hiller's rejection of Siewert's manuscript on female homosexuality. Siewert had asked Hiller to write a foreword to her planned book. Later, in the spring of 1958, the correspondence between Siewert and Hiller once again broke off suddenly. Apparently the two had become increasingly estranged from one another over the years, despite statements to the contrary.

Siewert's political attitudes may have played a role here. In the summer of 1947 she enthusiastically joined Hiller's German Socialist Freedom League (Freiheitsbund Deutscher Sozialisten or FDS) and willingly provided a room in her spacious apartment for the Berlin group's meetings. Siewert threw herself into shaping the association into "a potent party opposition to the SPD", but soon split with individual, communist-oriented members of the FDS who failed to distance themselves sufficiently from the East German Communist Party (Sozialistische Einheitspartei Deutschlands, or SED).

When Hiller attempted to win Siewert as a member of his New Socialist League (Neusozialistischer Bund) around 1956, Siewert reacted sympathetically, but was sceptical about her capacity for active participation due to her own health problems. Furthermore, her criticism of the SPD notwithstanding, she also wanted to avoid any weakening of its left wing. In her eyes, it was important not to play into the hands of the Adenauer government. Hiller, who always had a tendency to gather "followers" and not equal partners, reacted with reservation, against which Siewert protested.

In a letter to Hiller, she denied "anyone who was not permanently resident in Berlin in the 12 years after the end of the Second World War and was not active there in public (to a greater or lesser extent)" the right to criticize her "reluctance to attend any political party, group or manifestation". She cynically asked if Hiller really thought it would make sense "in the face of avalanches to stake the little banner of the upright seven (it will hardly be much more) into the ground". Hiller was not accustomed to such dissent from Siewert.

== Last years of life ==
Little is known about Siewert's living conditions from around the mid-1950s onwards. In the decades that followed, Siewert presumably lived in seclusion and in modest circumstances. She dreamed of living abroad several times and intended to emigrate to Portugal in 1958, apparently unsuccessfully. She regarded France as her spiritual home, but could not afford to move there. On 3 December 1994, Siewert was found dead in her apartment at Südwestkorso 33 in the Berlin suburb of Wilmersdorf, where she had lived since 1977. She was buried in the cemetery on Bergstrasse in the nearby suburb of Steglitz. However, after the legal rest period in 2016, the grave was reallocated.

== Rediscovery ==
The rediscovery of Siewert came about in the course of research conducted by the historian Raimund Wolfert. Around 2015, Wolfert increasingly turned his attention to unearthing the biographies of people from the second German homosexual rights movement (1950s) and came across the name Eva Siewert. In 2018, research into the life and work of Siewert was conducted by a four-person project team based at the Magnus Hirschfeld Society in Berlin. In cooperation with Wolfert, Sigrid Grajek, Martina Minette Dreier and Christine Olderdissen set up a "digital memorial room", which was completed in January 2019. The website is a so-called "scrollytelling" project, a multimedia site that contains texts as well as numerous photos and audio contributions. The project was funded by the Berlin State Office for Equal Treatment Against Discrimination (Berliner Landesstelle für Gleichbehandlung gegen Diskriminierung or LADS).

== Works ==
=== Stage plays ===
- 1949 Wie verhält sich Potiphar?, comedy in three acts
- 1955 Am Mittwoch um fünf, comedy in four episodes and a prelude and postlude

=== Essays and stories (selected) ===
- 1946 "Das Orakel", in: Der Weg. Zeitschrift für Fragen des Judentums (vol. 1), Nr. 37 (September 8, 1946), p. 5.
- 1946 "Aus dem Buch 'Barnimstraße 10'. Zwei Novembernächte, die Berlin in Trümmer legten", in: Die Weltbühne (vol. 1), Nr. 10 (November 15, 1946), p. 315–316.
- 1947 "Die beiden Gesichter. Zur Erinnerung an den 10. November 1938", in: Frankfurter Rundschau (vol. 3), Nr. 132 (November 11, 1947), p. 2.
- 1948 "Das Boot Pan. Ein Blatt", in: Die Erzählung. Zeitschrift für Freunde guter Literatur (vol. 2), Nr. 6 (June), p. 21–22.
- 1957 "Plädoyer für die Story", in: Die Andere Zeitung (vol. 3), Nr. 7 (Februar 14, 1957), p. 11.

== Sources ==
- Wolfert, Raimund (2017). "Verdammt männlich – Kurt Hiller und Eva Siewert". In Lütgemeier-Davin, Reinhold (ed.). Kurt Hiller und die Frauen. Beiträge einer Tagung in der Villa Ichon, Bremen 2016. Neumünster: von Bockel Verlag. pp. 109–121. ISBN 978-3-956-75017-5.
