= Franz Joseph von Bülow =

German author, soldier and activist

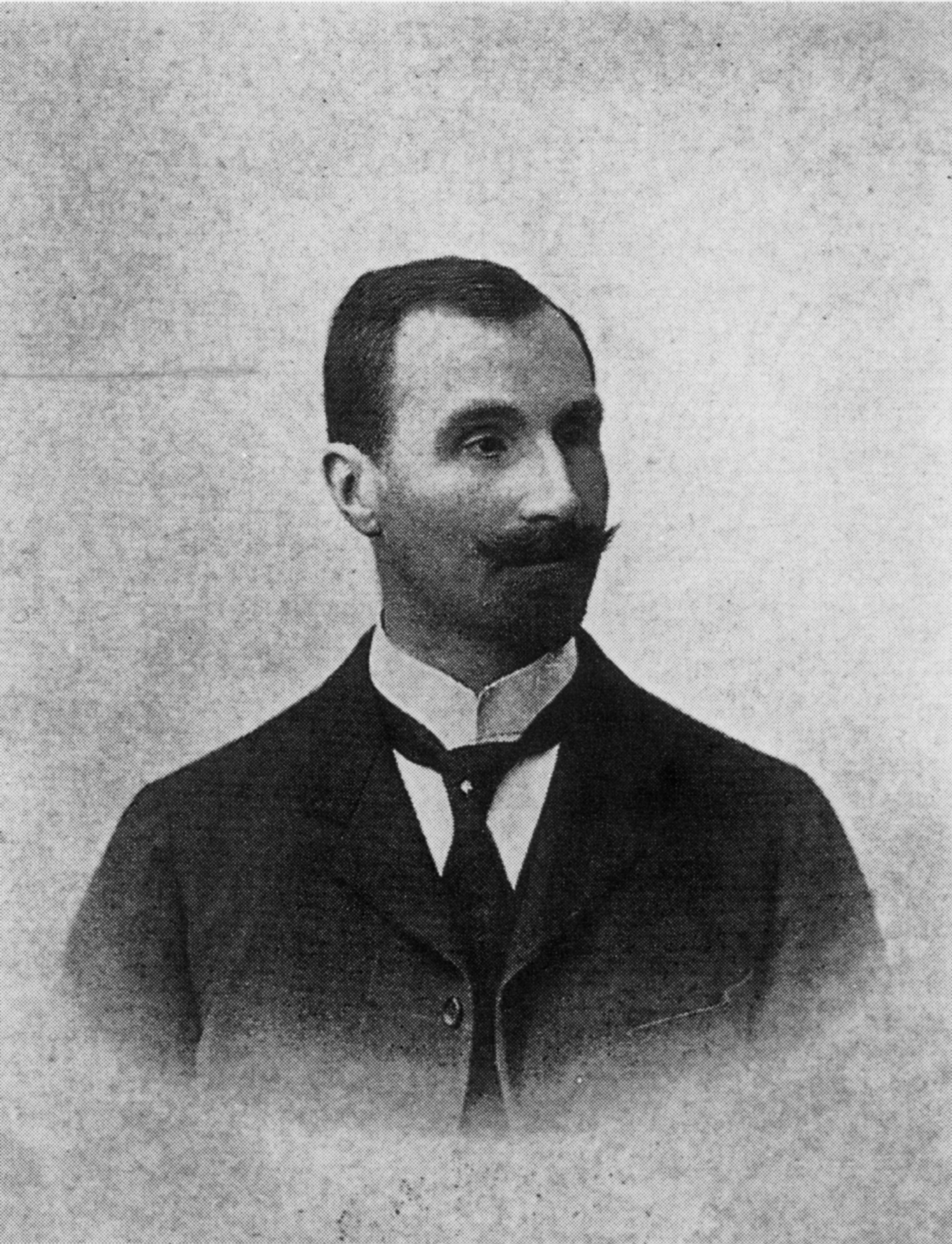
- Bülow in 1895
- Born: 11 September 1861; Free City of Frankfurt
- Died: 18 October 1915 (aged 54); Dresden, Germany
- Occupations: author, soldier
- Years active: before 1890–1900s
- Organization: Scientific-Humanitarian Committee
- Known for: homosexual activism
- Spouse: Konstanze Beust (m. 1898–1899)
- Parents: Bernhard Vollrath von Bülow (father); Paula von Bülow (mother)

Franz Vollrath Carl Wilhelm Joseph von Bülow (11 September 1861 – 18 October 1915) was a German author, soldier and homosexual activist.

== Life ==
Franz Vollrath Carl Wilhelm Joseph von Bülow was born on 11 September 1861 in the Free City of Frankfurt. Bülow's father was Bernhard Vollrath von Bülow, chamberlain of Mecklenburg-Schwerin and envoy to the German Confederation's Bundesversammlung in Frankfurt am Main, while his mother was Paula, née von Linden. Bülow attended high schools in Schwerin and Waren for his studies. Following that, he completed cadet schools at Plön and Gross-Lichterfelde. Bülow had advanced to the rank of lieutenant by 1890. In the same year, he left the service and joined the South West Africa Company in the German colonial South West Africa. In the years that followed, he authored a book on his experiences in German South West Africa and Cecil Rhodes' politics, as well as the Herero and Namaqua genocide. Bülow was blinded by a gunshot wound and therefore returned to Germany. He married divorced Countess Konstanze Beust, née von Goldacker, in 1898, but they divorced a year later.

According to Magnus Hirschfeld, Bülow was one of the co-founders of the Scientific-Humanitarian Committee in Berlin, together with Magnus Hirschfeld, Eduard Oberg, and Max Spohr. Bülow moved to Venice in 1900, where homosexuality was legal, unlike in Germany. He lived near San Polo on the Grand Canal at the Palazzo Tiepolo. Bülow left Venice with the outbreak of World War I and returned to Germany, where he died on 18 October 1915, in Dresden.

== Reception ==
Sociologist George Steinmetz describes Bülow's ethnographic writings as genocidal. He counts his books, together with the writings of Kurd Schwabe, among the most important eyewitness accounts of the relations between German colonial power and the Herero in the 1890s. Historians have used von Bülow's detailed recounting of the brutal approach of the Schutztruppe in South West Africa as sources for reconstructing the prehistory of the Herero and Nama genocide.
