= Die Freundschaft =

German gay magazine

Die Freundschaft (Friendship) was a German Weimar-era gay magazine that was published from 1919 to 1933.

== History ==
Die Freundschaft was founded by Karl Schultz on 13 August 1919, and was alternatively subtitled "Mitteilungsblatt des Klubs der Freunde und Freundinnen" ("News bulletin of the Club of [male] friends and [female] friends") or "Monatsschrift für den Befreiungskampf andersveranlagter Männer und Frauen" ("Monthly magazine for the liberation of men and women of different disposition"). It became the first gay publication to be sold openly at newsstands. It was edited by Max Danielsen until 1922, when he was replaced by Georg Plock. Rudolph Ihne was also involved in overseeing the magazine's publication. In 1922, two competing gay publications were merged into Die Freundschaft: Adolf Brand's Freundschaft und Freiheit (Friendship and Freedom) and René Stelter's Uranos.

Die Freundschaft's offices were located in Berlin's Baruther Straße. It was originally published weekly for the organisation Deutscher Freundschaftsverband (DFV), which became in 1923 Bund für Menschenrecht, but was later slowed to a monthly and then a semi-annual publication. Although each issue cost 50 pfennigs, which was relatively expensive, the magazine regularly sold out on its first day of publication in major German cities.

Most of Die Freundschaft's authors wrote under pseudonyms initially, but after a debate which concluded that the use of pseudonyms was counterproductive to the gay rights movement, most writers used their true names. Contributors wrote about the history of homosexuality and argued for its decriminalisation. They mostly approached the topics of homosexuality and gender variance from a spiritual rather than a science-based perspective, and considered how these topics could fit into existing religions. The magazine strongly promoted the ideas of reincarnation and karma. It also contained personal advertisements, photographs, and illustrations.

In 1928 the magazine was forced to dramatically change its format to avoid censorship, and in 1933 it was forced to cease publication by Nazi authorities.
