= Jahrbuch für sexuelle Zwischenstufen =

1899–1933 annual LGBTQ publication

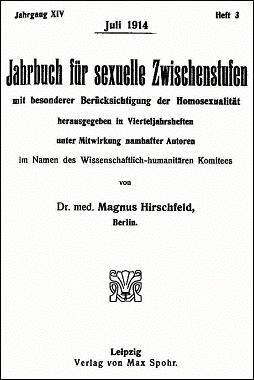
- July 1914 edition
- Discipline: Sexual and gender minorities
- Language: German
- Edited by: Magnus Hirschfeld

Publication details
- History: 1897–1933
- Publisher: Scientific-Humanitarian Committee (Germany)
- Frequency: Annually

Standard abbreviations
- ISO 4: Jahrb. Sex. Zwischenstufen

The Jahrbuch für sexuelle Zwischenstufen (English: Annual of Sexual Intermediaries) was a periodical of the Scientific-Humanitarian Committee (German: Wissenschaftlich-humanitäres Komitee, WhK), the world's first LGBT rights organization founded by German sexologist Magnus Hirschfeld in 1897. The annual publication featured articles on scientific, literary, and political topics related to sexual and gender minorities. It was published regularly from 1899 to 1923 (sometimes quarterly) in 23 volumes. The complete work comprised a total of more than 11,000 pages.

Since 2023, Michael Lombardi-Nash, who lives in Jacksonville, Florida, has been translating the “Annuals of Sexual Intermediaries” from German into English and publishing them under the title “Urania Manuscripts.”

In 2026, Lombardi-Nash completed Volume XXIII, the final volume of the series. All 23 volumes are now available in English translation.

== Notable contributors ==
- Psychiatry and sexology: Iwan Bloch, Alfred Fuchs, Richard von Krafft-Ebing, Albert Moll
- History and philology: Hans Licht (pseudonym of Paul Brandt), Numa Praetorius (pseudonym of Eugen Wilhelm), Lucien von Römer
- Art and literature: Elisabeth Dauthendey, Kurt Hiller, Elisar von Kupffer
- Theoretics of third gender: Hans Blüher, Benedict Friedlaender
- Feminism, lesbian rights: Arduin (pseudonym of Karl Friedrich Jordan), Anna Rüling (pseudonym of Theodora Sprüngli)

== Translations ==
- Annual of Sexual Intermediaries. Volume I. Translated by Michael Lombardi-Nash. Jacksonville, FL: Urania Manuscripts, 2023. (Original work published 1899) ISBN 979-8-3952-6858-7
- Annual of Sexual Intermediaries. Volume II. Translated by Michael Lombardi-Nash. Jacksonville, FL: Urania Manuscripts, 2023. (Original work published 1900)
- Annual of Sexual Intermediaries. Volume III. Translated by Michael Lombardi-Nash. Jacksonville, FL: Urania Manuscripts, 2024, Part 1 and 2. (Original work published 1901)
- Annual of Sexual Intermediaries. Volume IV. Translated by Michael Lombardi-Nash. Jacksonville, FL: Urania Manuscripts, 2024, Part 1, 2 and 3. (Original work published 1902)
- Annual of Sexual Intermediaries. Volume V. Translated by Michael Lombardi-Nash. Jacksonville, FL: Urania Manuscripts, 2023. Part 1 and 2. (Original work published 1903) ISBN 979-8-3976-3279-9
- Annual of Sexual Intermediaries. Volume VI. Translated by Michael Lombardi-Nash. Jacksonville, FL: Urania Manuscripts, 2024, Part 1 and 2. (Original work published 1904)
- Annual of Sexual Intermediaries. Volume VII. Translated by Michael Lombardi-Nash. Jacksonville, FL: Urania Manuscripts, 2025, Part 1, 2 and 3. (Original work published 1905) ISBN 979-8-3075-4020-6
- Annual of Sexual Intermediares. Vol. VIII. Translated by Michael Lombardi-Nash. Jacksonville: Urania Manuscripts, 2025.
- Annual of Sexual Intermediaries. Volume IX. Translated by Michael Lombardi-Nash. Jacksonville: Urania Manuscripts 2025. Part 1 and 2. (Original work published 1908)
- Annual of Sexual Intermediaries. Volume X. Translated by Michael Lombardi-Nash. Jacksonville: Urania Manuscripts, 2025. (Original work published 1910/11)
- Annual of Sexual Intermediaries. Volume XI. Translated by Michael Lombardi-Nash. Jacksonville: Urania Manuscripts, 2025. (Original published 1910/11)
- Annual of Sexual Intermediaries. Vol. XII. Translated by Michael Lombardi-Nash. Jacksonville: Urania Manuscripts, 2025. (Original work published 1911/12)
- Annual of Sexual Intermediaries. Vol. XIII. Translated by Michael Lombardi-Nash. Jacksonville: Urania Manuscripts, 2025. (Original work published 1912/13)
