= Alfred Fuchs =

Austrian neurologist

Alfred Fuchs (2 August 1870, Karolinenthal bei Prague – 5 October 1927, Döbling, Wien) was an Austrian neurologist and psychiatrist.

He studied medicine at the universities of Prague and Vienna, receiving his medical doctorate in 1894. He worked at the sanatorium in Purkersdorf, and later served as an assistant to Richard von Krafft-Ebing (from 1900) and Julius Wagner-Jauregg (from 1902) in Vienna. In 1905 he obtained his habilitation and in 1912 became an honorary associate professor. Up until the time of his death, he was associated with work done at Obersteiner's institution in Döbling.

He made contributions in his research of cerebrospinal fluid and his studies involving the measurement of pupil size. His name is associated with the Fuchs-Rosenthalsche Zählkammer ("Fuchs-Rosenthal counting chamber"), a means for counting cells in cerebrospinal fluid.

== Selected works ==
- Therapie der anomalen Vita sexualis bei Männern; mit specieller Berücksichtigung der Suggestivbehandlung, 1899 – Treatment of abnormal sexuality in men, etc.
- Die messung der pupillengrösse : und Zeitbestimmung der Lichtreaktion der Pupillen : bei einzelnen Psychosen und Nervenkrankheiten, 1904 – The measurement of pupil size and the timing of pupillar light reaction with individual psychoses and neuroses.
- Symptomatische Therapie und Pflege bei Tabes dorsalis, 1908 – Symptomatic therapy and care for tabes dorsalis.
- Einführung in das Studium der Nervenkrankheiten für Studierende und Ärzte, 1911 – Introduction to the study of nervous diseases.
- Elektrodiagnostik und Elektrotherapie für praktische Ärzte, 1914 – Electrodiagnostics and electrotherapy.
- Die konträre Sexualempfindung und andere Anomalien des Sexuallebens; Behandlung und Ergebnisse derselben, 1926 – The contrary sexual sensation and other anomalies of sexuality.

He also published several editions of Krafft-Ebing's Psychopathia sexualis.
