= Marie Huot =

French writer and activist (1846–1930)

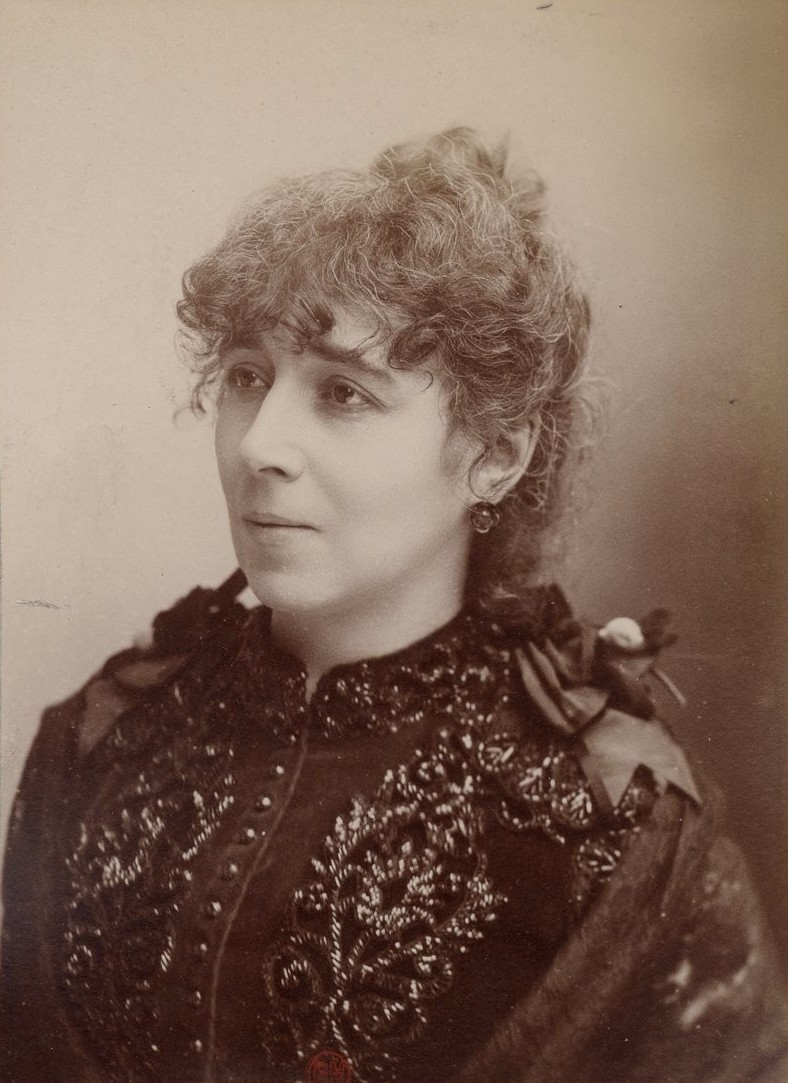
- Born: Mathilde Marie Constance Ménétrier; 28 June 1846; Yonne, France
- Died: 13 April 1930 (aged 83); Paris, France
- Occupations: Activist, writer
- Spouse: Anatole-Théodore-Marie Huot (m. 1869)

Marie Huot (born Mathilde Marie Constance Ménétrier; 28 June 1846 – 13 April 1930) was a French poet, writer, feminist, and animal rights and vegetarianism activist.

== Biography ==
Mathilde Marie Constance Ménétrier was born in 1846. In 1869, she married Anatole-Théodore-Marie Huot, the editor of the leftist Parisian review, L'Encyclopédie Contemporaine Illustrée. She was a close friend of the Swedish anarchist and impressionist painter Ivan Aguéli, whom she indirectly introduced to Sufism and to whom she dedicated her collection of Symbolist poems Le Missel de Notre-Dame des Solitudes ("The Missal of Our Lady of Solitudes").

Huot was an advocate for animal rights and member of the Parisian animal protection society, founder of the Popular League against Vivisection and France's first hospice for animals. She was famous for a number of spectacular activist actions. In 1886, she interrupted a lecture by Louis Pasteur at the Sorbonne University, for using dogs in animal testing. Once, at Collège de France, she hit the Mauritian scientist Charles-Édouard Brown-Séquard over the head with a parasol for having performed a vivisection on a monkey. In 1900, she helped Ivan Aguéli in his attack on two matadors at a French bullfight.

Active in the French Neo-Malthusianism movement, Huot was the originator of the expression "la grève des ventres" ("strike of the bellies" or "birth strike"). In 1892, Huot delivered a public conference, in which she demanded free access to abortion and contraception. At this conference, Huot also advocated for the voluntary extinction of the human race by refusal to procreate, both out of compassion for human suffering and the suffering that humans inflict on animals. This was later published, in 1909, as Le Mal de Vivre ("The Pain of Living").

== Selected publications ==
=== Articles ===
- "Le Droit des Animaux" ("Animal Law"), La Revue socialiste, Iss. 6, 1887, pp. 47–56

=== Books ===
- Le Missel de Notre-Dame des Solitudes ("The Missal of Our Lady of Solitudes") (Paris: E. Sansot, 1908) (preface by Rachilde)
- Le Mal de Vivre ("The Pain of Living") (Paris: Génération Consciente, 1909)
