= Lucien von Römer =

Dutch physician, botanist and writer (1873–1965)

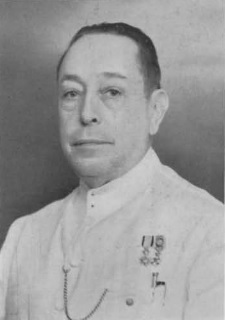
Lucien von Römer

Lucien Sophie Albert Marie von Römer (23 August 1873 – 23 December 1965) was a Dutch physician, botanist and writer. He often wrote about homosexuality, and argued that it was an innate characteristic. He practiced medicine in the Dutch East Indies (later Indonesia) in his later life. His views parallel those of psychiatrist Sigmund Freud on this topic.

== Netherlands ==
Lucien von Römer was born in 1873 in Kampen, Overijssel, Netherlands in to a prominent military family of German heritage. He studied medicine at Leiden University and the University of Amsterdam, and received his medical license in 1903. He went on to practice as a neurologist.

Von Römer was particularly interested in homosexuality, and worked in Berlin with the prominent sexologists Magnus Hirschfeld and Albert Moll. He was a regular contributor to Hirschfeld's journal, Jahrbuch für sexuelle Zwischenstufen (Journal for Sexual Transitions); his first article, a profile of King Henry III of France, was published in 1902. In addition to homosexuality, Von Römer also wrote for the Jahrbuch about androgyny, hermaphroditism and the reception of Arnold Aletrino's works. In 1908, he published an anthology of Friedrich Nietzsche's writings on homosexuality in Hirschfeld's Zeitschrift für Sexualwissenschaft. In the same year, he submitted a postdoctoral dissertation that argued that homosexuality was innate, but it was rejected by the University of Amsterdam on the grounds that it was "in conflict with morality and offensive to others".

== Dutch East Indies ==
Von Römer left the Netherlands and joined an expedition to New Guinea as a botanist in 1910. He discovered numerous plants on the expedition, some of which were named after him. He settled in the Dutch East Indies in 1913, where he worked as a public health specialist and a regional government physician. In 1921, he married Eugenie Gallois, a pianist, and had a son. After retiring, he continued to practice psychiatry in Malang, where he died in 1965 at the age of 92.
