= Max Spohr =

German bookseller and publisher

Johannes Hermann August Wilhelm Max Spohr (November 17, 1850 in Braunschweig – November 15, 1905 in Leipzig) was a German bookseller and publisher. He was one of the first publishers worldwide who published LGBT publications. Later Adolf Brand in Berlin published the first LGBT periodical magazine Der Eigene.

Spohr was born in 1850 as the son of businessman Karl Wilhelm Friedrich Spohr and Ferdinande Lisette. He worked in Pécs, Hannover and Leipzig. With Rudolf Wengler he founded the publishing company Wengler & Spohr in Braunschweig. On December 20, 1880, he married Elisabeth Hannöver-Jansen, and fathered three sons with her. In 1897, Magnus Hirschfeld founded the Scientific Humanitarian Committee with Spohr, the lawyer Eduard Oberg, and the writer Franz Joseph von Bülow.

In 2001, 96 years after his death, a street in Leipzig was named by his family name.

In honor of Max Spohr, the German LGBT organisation Völklinger Kreis established the Max-Spohr-Management-Preis for companies in Germany that have a good record of diversity management.
