= Hermann von Teschenberg =

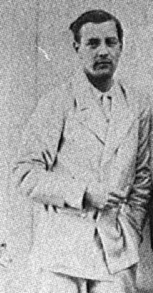

Hermann Freiherr von Teschenberg (6 July 1866 – 6 November 1911) was an Austrian barrister, translator, and an LGBT rights activist.

== Life ==
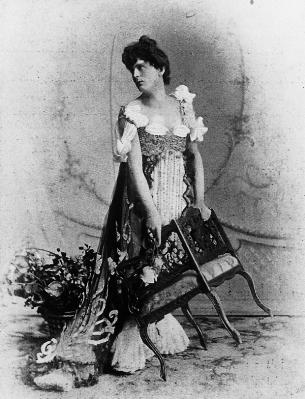
Hermann von Teschenberg (1866–1911)

Born in Austria, von Teschenberg was the son of a diplomat, Ernst Freiherr von Teschenberg (1836–1886) and Rosa Peetz. His father was also editor of the Wiener Zeitung on behalf of the government. So he spent his childhood among elites in Austria, getting to know the future King Alfonso XII of Spain and Empress Elisabeth of Austria.

He studied law in college and married, although the name of his wife is not known. He was discovered kissing a soldier in Prater park in Vienna, after which he fled to Italy in 1893-94, and later to England. By his own account, he met Oscar Wilde and tried to mediate between the writer and the father of Lord Alfred Douglas, the Marquess of Queensberry. He translated some of Oscar Wilde's works into the German language.

In early 1898, he settled in Berlin, joining Magnus Hirschfeld, who had founded the Scientific-Humanitarian Committee. Teschenberg was even named later among the founders of the Committee, working without pay from 1898 to 1905. He was also a transvestite and photographed several times wearing women's clothing for the Committee magazine.

After 1905, he moved to Italy, where homosexuality was not illegal. He died in Naples in 1911.
