= Scientific-Humanitarian Committee =

German LGBT rights organization founded in 1897

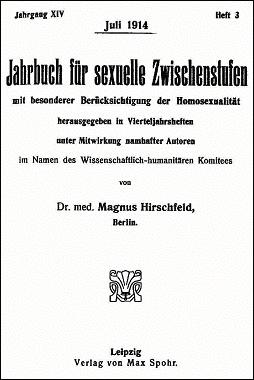
The July 1914 edition of the Yearbook for Intermediate Sexual Types

The Scientific-Humanitarian Committee (German: Wissenschaftlich-humanitäres Komitee, WhK) was a transnational advocacy group and civil rights organization founded by Magnus Hirschfeld in Berlin in May 1897, to campaign for the legal rights and social recognition of lesbian, gay, bisexual, and transgender (LGBT) people, and against their institutionalized discrimination and persecution in Western societies. It was the first LGBT rights organization in history. The motto of the organization was Per scientiam ad justitiam ("Through science to justice"), and the committee included representatives from various professions. The committee's membership peaked at about 700 people. In 1929, Kurt Hiller took over as chairman of the group from Hirschfeld. At its peak, the WhK had branches in approximately 25 cities in Weimar Germany, the Republic of Austria, and the Netherlands.

== History ==
The WhK was founded in Berlin-Charlottenburg, a locality of Berlin, on 14 or 15 May 1897 (about four days before Oscar Wilde's release from prison) by Magnus Hirschfeld, a German physician, sexologist, and outspoken advocate for gender and sexual minorities. Original members of the WhK included Hirschfeld, publisher Max Spohr, lawyer Eduard Oberg, and writer Franz Joseph von Bülow. Adolf Brand, Benedict Friedländer, Hermann von Teschenberg and Kurt Hiller also joined the organization. A split in the organization occurred in December 1906, led by Friedländer.

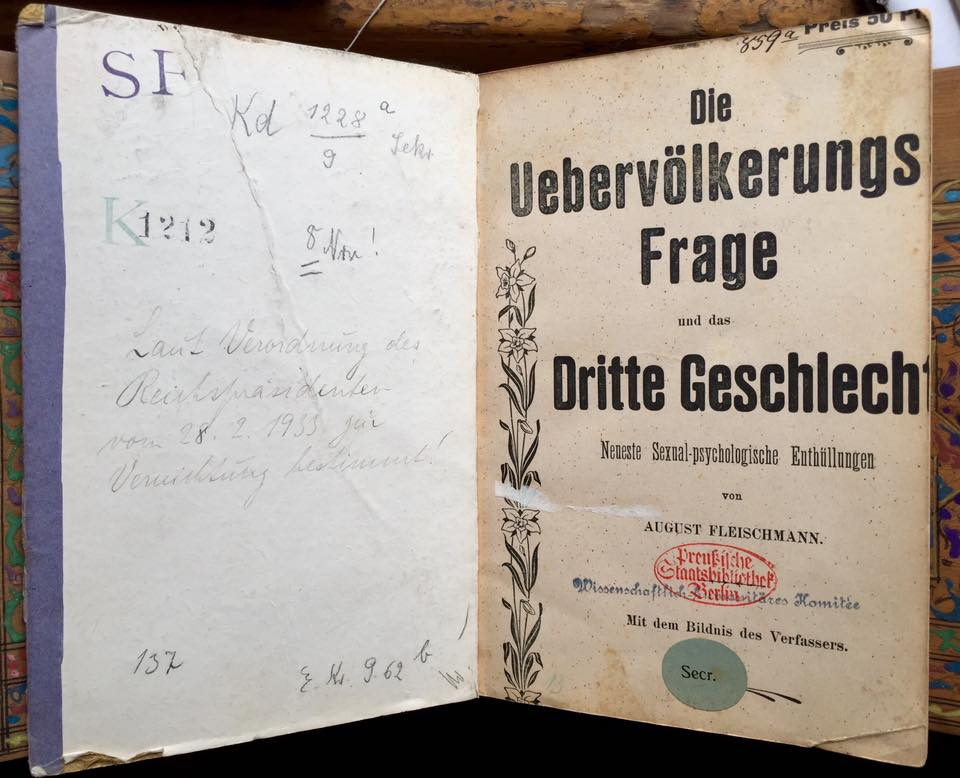
Vita homosexualis, a 1902 collection of August Fleischmann's popular pamphlets on third gender and against §175 – a Wissenschaftlich-humanitäres Komitee library copy, confiscated on 6 May 1933, annotated on the endpaper: By Reichspräsident's decree of 28.02.1933 destined for destruction! and hidden from the publique (label "Secr.") as Nazi plunder by the Prussian State Library. This book, and other that may have survived the destruction of the Wissenschaftlich-humanitäres Komitee and the Institut für Sexualwissenschaft, are sought after by the Magnus-Hirschfeld-Gesellschaft in Berlin.

The committee was based in the Institute for Sexual Sciences in Berlin until the institute's destruction at the hands of Nazis in 1933. The WhK was affiliated with the World League for Sexual Reform, another group founded by Hirschfeld which had similar aims to the committee. The committee had ties to gay organizations across the world, and from 1906 onward the body which crafted the committee's policy was made up of members from several European countries. A branch in Vienna, Austria, was opened in 1906, led by Joseph Nicoladoni and Wilhelm Stekel. In 1911, the Dutch branch of the Scientific-Humanitarian Committee was formed by Jacob Schorer.

The WhK took a great deal of scientific theories on human sexuality from the institute such as the idea of a third sex between a man and a woman. The initial focus of the committee was to repeal Paragraph 175, an anti-gay piece of legislation of the Imperial Penal Code, which criminalized "coitus-like" acts between males. It also sought to demonstrate the innateness of homosexuality and thus make the criminal law against sodomy in Germany at the time inapplicable.

In campaigning against Paragraph 175, the committee argued that homosexuality was not a disease or moral failing, and said they reached this conclusion from scientific evidence. The group made other arguments against this law, saying for example that its repeal would reduce blackmailing behavior among male prostitutes. Beginning in 1919 and 1920, the WhK allied with other homosexual rights groups including the Gemeinschaft der Eigenen (Community of the Special) and Deutscher Freundschaftsverband (German Friendship Association) to oppose the law. Another alliance held by the committee in its activism against Paragraph 175 was with the Deutscher Bund für Mutterschutz (German League for the Protection of Motherhood), especially after proponents of Paragraph 175 proposed extending it to women.

The committee created sex-education pamphlets on the topic of homosexuality and distributed them to the public. It had begun distributing this type of material to university students and factory laborers as early as 1903. They also assisted defendants in criminal trials, and gathered more than 6,000 signatures on a petition for the repeal of Paragraph 175. The committee's opposition was not indiscriminate, as its petition did support preservation of criminal status for some homosexual acts, including cases between an adult and a minor under age 16. At the time of the original proposal, the age of consent was in fact two years lower than that for heterosexual people, at age 14; effectively they called for the age of consent to be raised as part of their campaign.

Work on promoting their petition began in 1897, and the committee particularly wanted signatures from those with prominent status in such fields as politics, medicine, art, and science. They sent thousands of letters to key figures such as Catholic priests, judges, lawmakers, journalists, and mayors. August Bebel was among the first four people who signed the petition and took copies to the Reichstag to urge colleagues to add their names. Other signatories included Albert Einstein, Hermann Hesse, Thomas Mann, Rainer Maria Rilke, and Leo Tolstoy.

During World War I, supporters and members went to fight in the war. Some of its publications were affected by censorship during this time period. The petition campaign largely fell by the wayside until the war was over. Hirschfeld focused on showcasing the experiences of homosexual soldiers; he collected thousands of letters, interviews, and surveys with such soldiers. Petitions were submitted in 1898, 1922, and 1925, but failed to gain the support of the parliament. The law continued to criminalize homosexuality until 1969 and was not entirely removed in West Germany until four years after East and West Germany became one country in 1994.

Officially, the committee was non-partisan politically, and made efforts to appeal to parliamentarians from many parties. This sometimes even included conservative parties such as the Bavarian People's Party (BVP). However, Hirschfeld was a member of the Social Democratic Party (SPD). Some other leaders in the group had revolutionary or pacifist sympathies. While the committee was somewhat informally associated with the SPD, they were also alienated by the SPD's rhetorical exploitation of Ernst Röhm's homosexuality as a means to harm the Nazi Party politically. After seeing these attacks against Röhm in a newspaper aligned with the SPD, the committee responded, "The statements in the Münchner Post, hearkening back to the Apostle Paul and employing the entire vocabulary of our conservative-clerical persecutors, could have been printed without changing a word by the most strictly Catholic press." This conflict of interests caused the committee to privately question the executive of the SPD as to whether they were still in favor of repealing Paragraph 175; the SPD affirmed that was still their position.

The biological deterministic tendency that Hirschfeld gave to the committee met with opposition within the WhK from the start. But it was not until November 24, 1929 that his internal competitors, above all the Communist Party (KPD) functionary Richard Linsert, succeeded in forcing Hirschfeld to resign. He was succeeded by the Medical Councilor Otto Juliusburger, Kurt Hiller was elected Deputy Chairman and the writer Bruno Vogel became the third member of the new board. Juliusburger led the committee in the short time that elapsed until the committee was dissolved after the Nazi Party came to power in 1933. The committee's final meeting took place in Peter Limann's apartment on June 8, 1933, with the singular purpose of dissolving the organization. A reorientation of the WhK that freed it from its scientific isolation was the focus placed on psychological and sociological research instead of biological research.

The committee was based in Berlin and had branches in about 25 German, Austrian and Dutch cities. It had roughly 700 members at its peak and is considered an important milestone in the homosexual emancipation movement. It existed for thirty-six years.

== Publications ==
The WhK produced the Jahrbuch für sexuelle Zwischenstufen (Yearbook for Intermediate Sexual Types), a publication which reported the committee's activities and contained content ranging from articles about homosexuality among "primitive" people to literary analyses and case studies. It was published regularly from 1899 to 1923 (sometimes quarterly) and more sporadically until 1933. Yearbook was the world's first scientific journal dealing with sexual variants.

Another of the WhK's widespread publications was a brochure entitled Was soll das Volk vom dritten Geschlecht wissen? (What Must Our Nation Know about the Third Sex?) that was produced alongside the committee's sexual education lectures. It offered information on homosexuality, pulling largely from the studies of the Institute for Sexual Sciences. The brochure offered a rare case of nonjudgmental insight into the existence of homosexuality and, as such, was frequently distributed by homosexuals to family members or to total strangers on public transport.

== Reformation attempts ==
In October 1949, Hans Giese joined with Hermann Weber (1882–1955), head of the Frankfurt local group from 1921 to 1933, to re-establish the group in Kronberg. Kurt Hiller worked with them briefly, but stopped due to personal differences after a few months. The group was dissolved in late 1949 or early 1950 and instead formed the Committee for Reform of the Sexual Criminal Laws (Gesellschaft für Reform des Sexualstrafrechts e. V.), which existed until 1960.

In 1962 in Hamburg, Kurt Hiller, who had survived Nazi concentration camps and continued to fight against anti-gay repression, tried unsuccessfully to re-establish the WhK.

== New WhK ==
In 1998, a new group was formed with the same name. Growing out of a group against politician Volker Beck in that year's election, it is similar in name and general subject matter only, and takes more radical positions than the conservative LSVD. In 2001, its magazine 'Gigi was given a special award by the German Association of Lesbian and Gay Journalists.

== See also ==
- Ernst Burchard
- Gay liberation
- LGBTQ in Germany
- LGBTQ social movement
- Timeline of LGBTQ history
  - Persecution of homosexuals in Nazi Germany
  - Persecution of lesbians in Nazi Germany
  - Persecution of trans people in Nazi Germany
- Uranian
