= Kurt Hiller =

German essayist and activist (1885–1972)

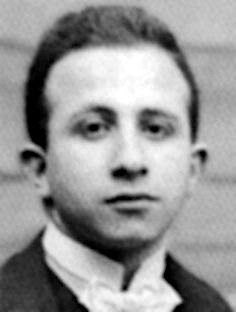
- Kurt Hiller, 1903
- Born: August 17, 1885; Berlin, German Empire
- Died: October 1, 1972 (aged 87); Hamburg, West Germany
- Occupations: Writer, essayist, philosopher, political activist
- Known for: Advocacy for human rights and legal reform; leadership in the Scientific-Humanitarian Committee

Kurt Hiller (17 August 1885, Berlin – 1 October 1972, Hamburg) was a German essayist, lawyer, and expressionist poet. He was also a political (namely pacifist) journalist.

== Biography ==
Hiller came from a middle-class Jewish background. A communist, he was deeply influenced by Immanuel Kant and Arthur Schopenhauer, despising the philosophy of G. W. F. Hegel, which made him quite unpopular with Marxists.

Hiller was educated at the University of Berlin around 1900 where he met other left-wing and homosexual activists, like sexologist Magnus Hirschfeld, left-wing activist Georg Simmel (who was his doctoral advisor), and his life-long friend, gay author Hugo Marcus.

At the start of the 20th century, Berlin had a prominent homosexual scene, home to many gay bars and clubs, and was generally less sexually conservative than other places. Because of this, gay rights activists, including Hiller came to Berlin to practice their activism and form groups like Hirschfeld's Scientific-Humanitarian Committee, of which Hiller was a member. Despite being more safe than elsewhere, homosexual activists in Berlin usually did not out themselves as homosexual and fronted their championing of gay rights as a general humanitarian effort rather than a personal one. At the start of his career as an activist, however, Hiller described himself as "gay" and In a 1905 Scientific-Humanitarian Committee meeting, he proposed a mass self-outing of a thousand homosexuals, as he thought it would help their cause. The proposal was denied.

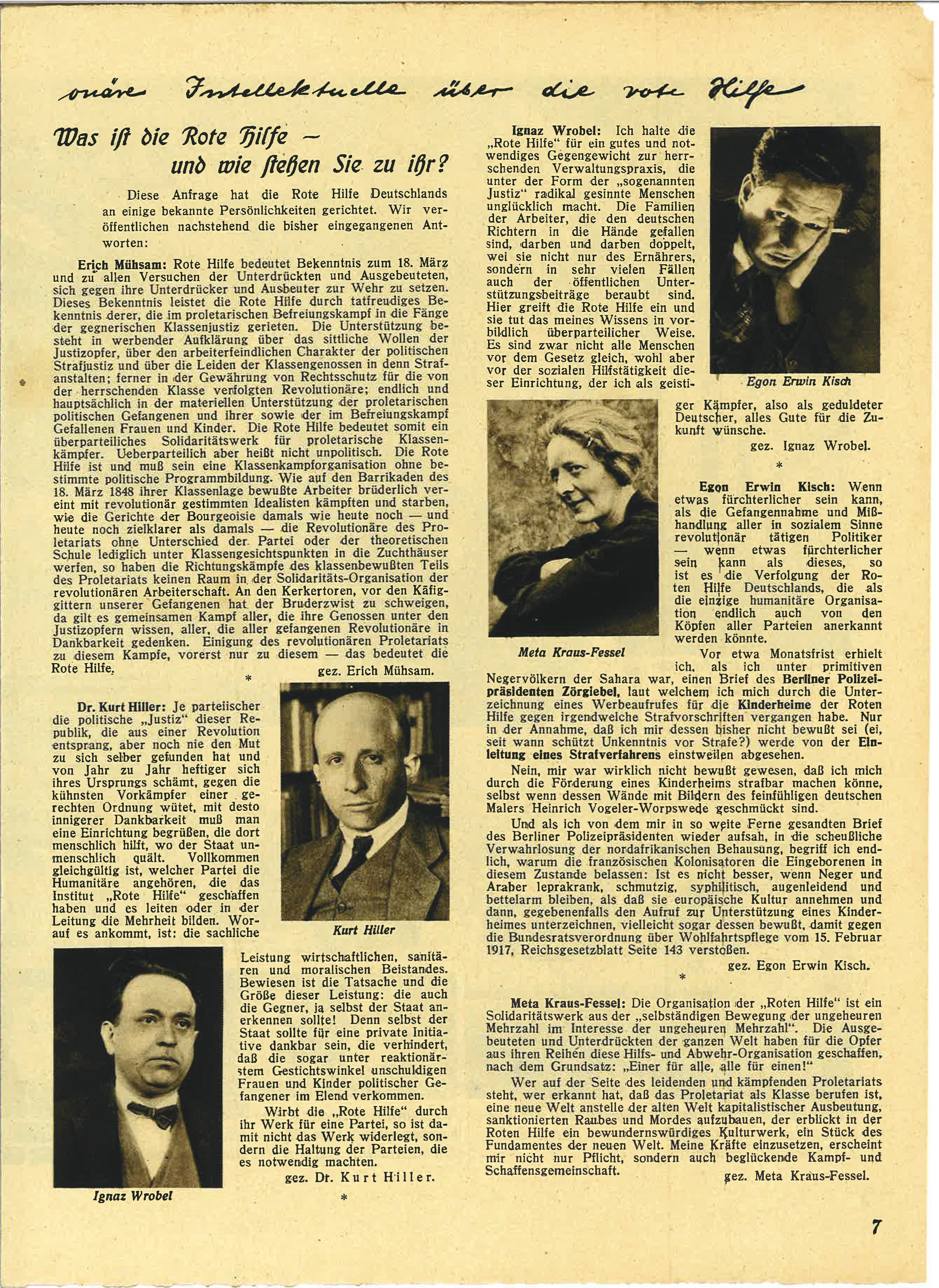
Hiller (second from left) in Der Roter Helfer, April 1927

Hiller became an influential writer in the early German gay rights movement in the first two decades of the 20th century. Hiller was elected as vice-chairman of the Scientific Humanitarian Committee in 1929. In 1929 he took over as chairman from fellow gay activist Magnus Hirschfeld. Like Hirschfeld, he had affairs with men but did not publicly identify himself as homosexual.

He is remembered, too, for his book §175: Schmach des Jahrhunderts (Paragraph 175: Outrage of the Century) published in 1922. Hiller maintained that if homosexuals wanted change, they would have to effect it themselves. Hiller was arrested by the Gestapo in March 1933 following the Nazi seizure of power and was severely beaten before his release in August 1933. He spent nine months in prisons and in the earliest concentration camps, being transferred to Columbia-Haus, Brandenburg and Oranienburg concentration camp. He was released in April 1934.

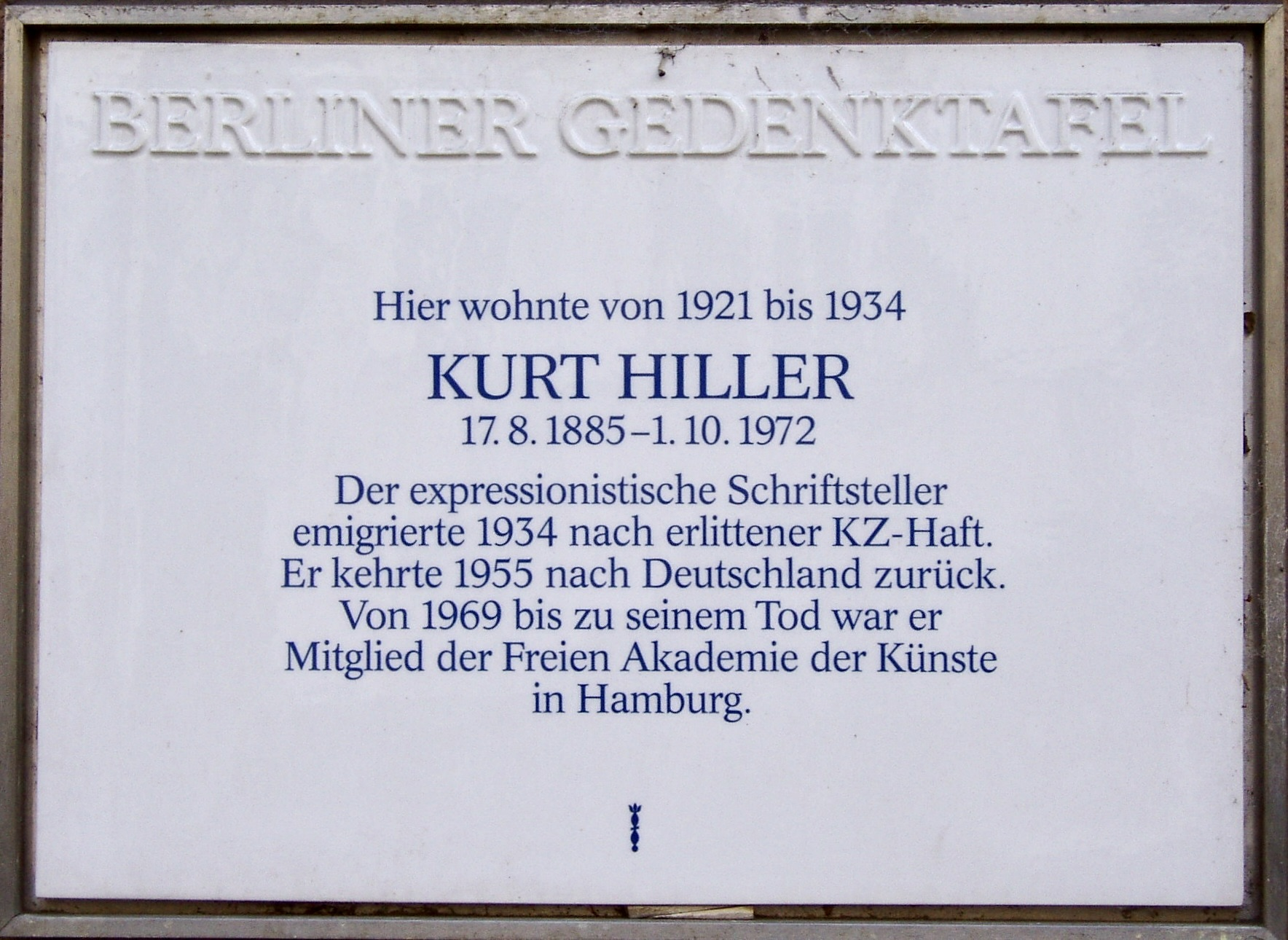
Memorial to Kurt Hiller in Berlin

He fled to Prague immediately after his release, and met his partner Walter D. Schultz (a member of the Social Democratic Party of Germany) there while in exile. He later left Prague for London in 1938. In 1955, he returned to West Germany, shortly after which he tried and failed to reestablish the Scientific Humanitarian Committee. In the 1960s, he began formulating another attempt to petition against Paragraph 175, but did not complete it. He lived and wrote in Hamburg until his death in 1972.

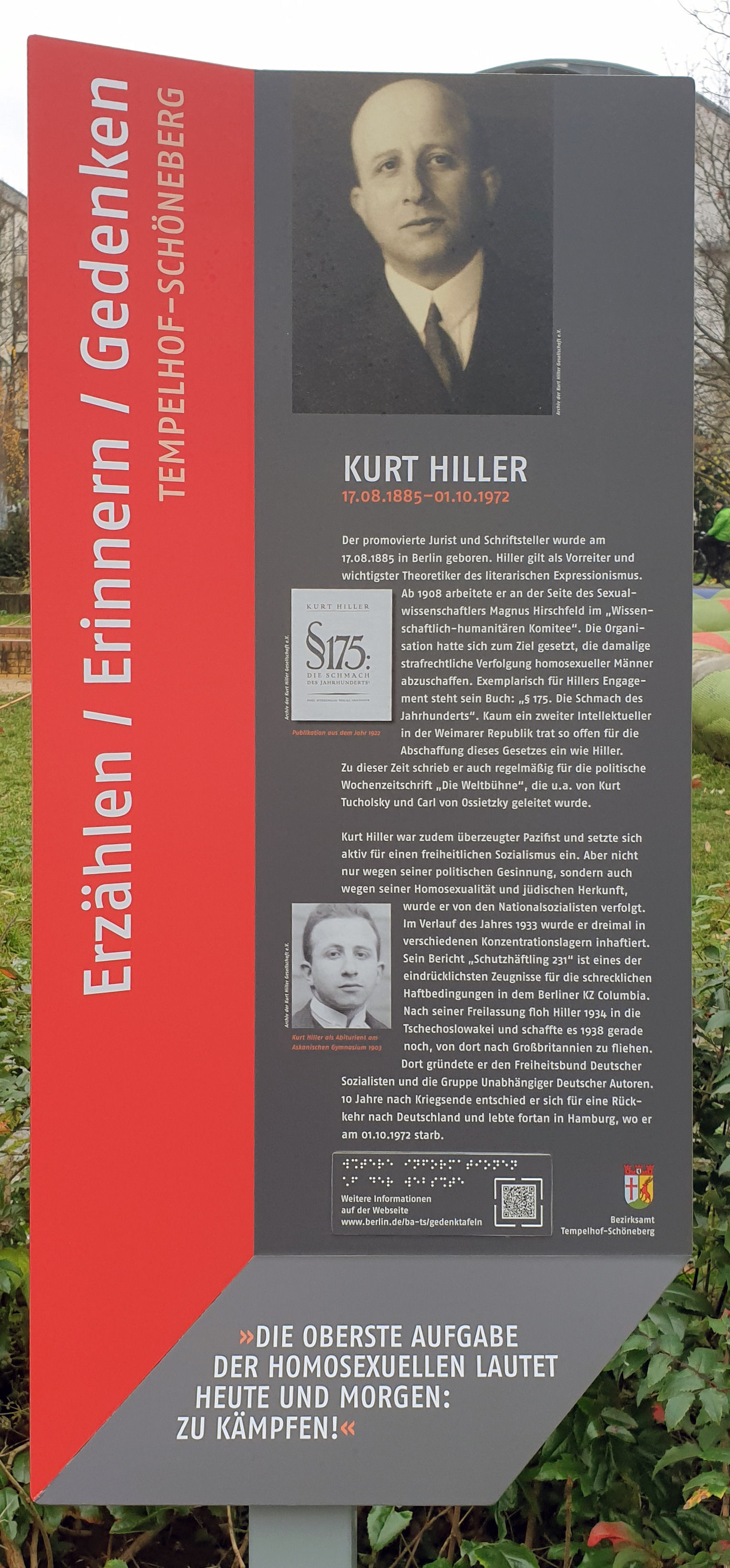
Memorial plaque at Kurt Hiller Park, in Berlin-Schöneberg

As a renowned and prominent gay activist from the beginning of the century to his death, he was connected with many other activists of the first homosexual movement such as Magnus Hirschfeld, Eva Siewert and many more.

== Works ==
The following have been translated into English:

- § 175. Outrage of the Century. Translated by M. Lombardi-Nash (1922; Jacksonville, FL: Urania Manuscripts, 2026).
