= History of abortion =

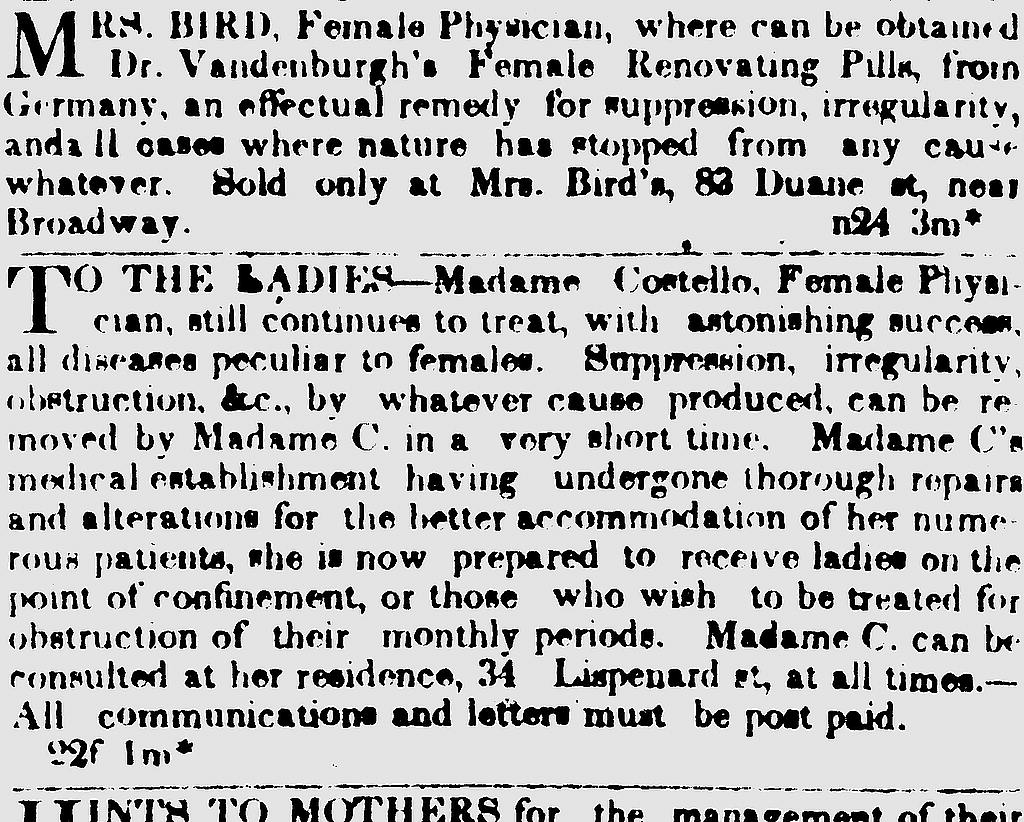
Indirect advertisements for abortion services, like these in The Sun in 1842, were common during the Victorian era. At the time, abortion was illegal in New York.

The practice of induced abortion—the deliberate termination of a pregnancy—has been known since ancient times. Various methods have been used to perform or attempt abortion, including the administration of abortifacient herbs, the use of sharpened implements, the application of abdominal pressure, and other techniques. The term abortion, or more precisely spontaneous abortion, is sometimes used to refer to a naturally occurring condition that ends a pregnancy, that is, to what is popularly called a miscarriage. But in what follows the term abortion will always refer to an induced abortion.

Abortion laws and their enforcement have fluctuated through various eras. In much of the Western world during the 20th century, abortion-rights movements were successful in having abortion bans repealed. While abortion remains legal in most of the West, this legality is regularly challenged by anti-abortion groups. The Soviet Union under Vladimir Lenin is recognized as the first modern country to legalize induced elective abortion care. In the twentieth century China used induced abortion as part of a "one-child policy" birth control campaign in an effort to slow population growth.

== Premodern era ==
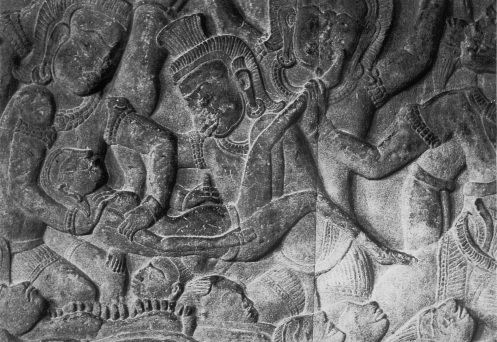
Bas relief at Angkor Wat, c. 1150, depicting a demon performing an abortion upon a woman who has been sent to the underworld

The Vedic and smrti laws of India reflected a concern with preserving the male seed of the three upper castes; and the religious courts imposed various penances for the woman or excommunication for a priest who provided an abortion. Part of the epic Ramayana describes abortion performed by barber surgeons. The only evidence of the death penalty being mandated for abortion in the ancient laws is found in Assyrian Law, in the Code of Assura, c. 1075 BCE; and this is imposed only on a woman who procures an abortion against her husband's wishes. The first recorded evidence of induced abortion is from the Egyptian Ebers Papyrus in 1550 BCE.

Many of the methods employed in early cultures were non-surgical. Physical activities such as strenuous labor, climbing, paddling, weightlifting, or diving were a common technique. Others included the use of irritant leaves, fasting, bloodletting, pouring hot water onto the abdomen, and lying on a heated coconut shell. In virtually all cultures, abortion techniques developed through observation, adaptation of obstetrical methods, and transculturation. Physical means of inducing abortion, including battery, exercise, and tightening the girdle were still often used as late as the Early Modern Period among English women.

Archaeological discoveries indicate early surgical attempts at the extraction of a fetus; however, such methods are not believed to have been common, given the infrequency with which they are mentioned in ancient medical texts.

An 8th-century Sanskrit text instructs women wishing to induce an abortion to sit over a pot of steam or stewed onions. The technique of massage abortion, involving the application of pressure to the pregnant abdomen, has been practiced in Southeast Asia for centuries. One of the bas reliefs decorating the temple of Angkor Wat in Cambodia, dated c. 1150, depicts a demon performing such an abortion upon a woman who has been sent to the underworld.

Japanese documents show records of induced abortion from as early as the 12th century. It became much more prevalent during the Edo period, especially among the peasant class, who were hit hardest by the recurrent famines and high taxation of the age. Statues of the Boddhisattva Jizo, erected in memory of an abortion, miscarriage, stillbirth, or young childhood death, began appearing at least as early as 1710 at a temple in Yokohama (see religion and abortion).

The Māori people of New Zealand prior to colonisation terminated pregnancies via miscarriage-inducing drugs, ceremonial methods, and girding of the abdomen with a restrictive belt. Another source claims that the Māori people did not practice abortion, for fear of Mākutu, but did attempt abortion through the artificial induction of premature labor.

=== Greco-Roman world ===
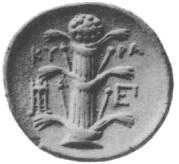
Cyrenian coin with an image of silphium, a contraceptive plant, but could also have been an abortifacient

Much of what is known about the methods and practice of abortion in Greek and Roman history comes from early classical texts. Abortion, as a gynecological procedure, was primarily the province of women who were either midwives or well-informed laypeople. In his Theaetetus, Plato mentions a midwife's ability to induce abortion in the early stages of pregnancy. It is thought unlikely that abortion was punished in Ancient Greece. A fragment attributed to the poet Lysias "suggests that abortion was a crime in Athens against the husband, if his wife was pregnant when he died, since his unborn child could have claimed the estate."

The ancient Greeks relied upon the herb silphium as an abortifacient and contraceptive. The plant, as the chief export of Cyrene, was driven to extinction; it is suggested that it might have possessed the same abortive properties, as some of its closest extant relatives in the family Apiaceae. Silphium was so central to the Cyrenian economy that most of its coins were embossed with an image of the plant. Pliny the Elder (23–79 CE) cited the refined oil of common rue as a potent abortifacient. Serenus Sammonicus wrote of a concoction which consisted of rue, egg, and dill. Soranus, Dioscorides, Oribasius also detailed this application of the plant. Modern scientific studies have confirmed that rue indeed contains three abortive compounds. Birthwort, a herb used to ease childbirth, was also used to induce abortion. Galen included it in a potion formula in de Antidotis, while Dioscorides said it could be administered by mouth, or in the form of a vaginal pessary also containing pepper and myrrh.

The Greek playwright Aristophanes noted the abortifacient property of pennyroyal in 421 BCE, through a humorous reference in his comedy, Peace. Hippocrates (c. 460 – c. 370 BCE), the Greek physician, would advise a prostitute who became pregnant to jump up and down, touching her buttocks with her heels at each leap, so as to induce miscarriage. Other writings attributed to him describe instruments fashioned to dilate the cervix and curette inside of the uterus.

Soranus, a 2nd-century Greek physician, prescribed diuretics, emmenagogues, enemas, fasting, and bloodletting as safe abortion methods, although he advised against the use of sharp instruments to induce miscarriage, due to the risk of organ perforation. He also advised women wishing to abort their pregnancies to engage in energetic walking, carrying heavy objects, riding animals, and jumping so that the woman's heels were to touch her buttocks with each jump, which he described as the "Lacedaemonian Leap". He also offered a number of recipes for herbal baths, rubs, and pessaries. In De Materia Medica Libri Quinque, the Greek pharmacologist Dioscorides listed the ingredients of a draught called "abortion wine"– hellebore, squirting cucumber, and scammony– but failed to provide the precise manner in which it was to be prepared. Hellebore, in particular, is known to be abortifacient.

Tertullian, a 2nd- and 3rd-century Christian theologian, described surgical implements which were used in a procedure similar to the modern dilation and evacuation. One tool had a "nicely adjusted flexible frame" used for dilation, an "annular blade" used to curette, and a "blunted or covered hook" used for extraction. The other was a "copper needle or spike". He attributed ownership of such items to Hippocrates, Asclepiades, Erasistratus, Herophilus, and Soranus.

Aulus Cornelius Celsus, a 1st-century Roman encyclopedist, offered an extremely detailed account of a procedure to extract an already-dead fetus in his only surviving work, De Medicina. In Book 9 of Refutation of all Heresies, Hippolytus of Rome, another Christian theologian of the 3rd century, wrote of women tightly binding themselves around the middle so as to "expel what was being conceived".

=== Natural abortifacients ===
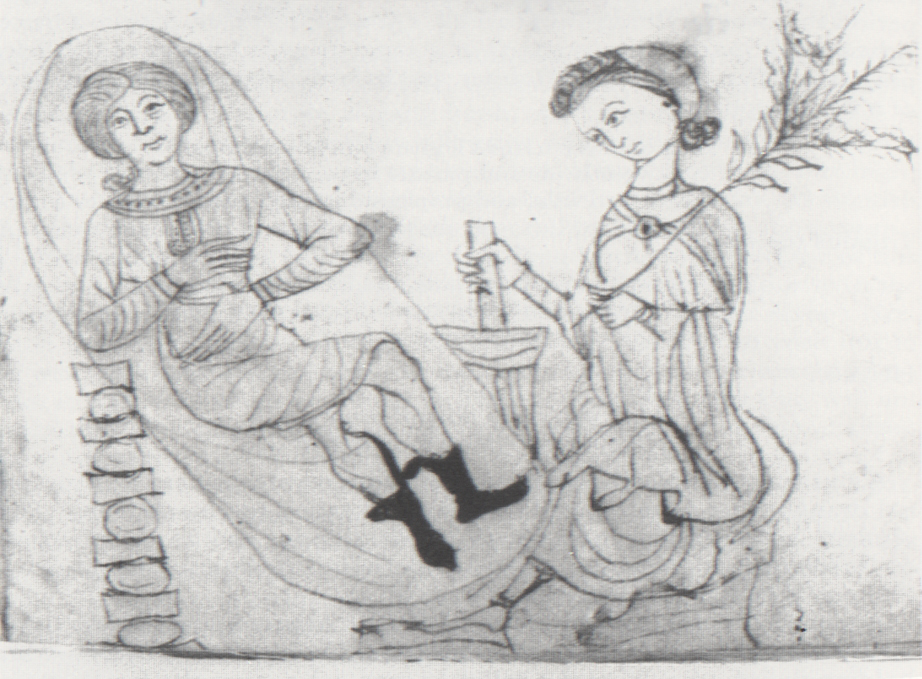
Art from a 13th-century illuminated manuscript features a herbalist preparing a concoction containing pennyroyal for a woman.

Botanical preparations reputed to be abortifacient were common in classical literature and folk medicine. Such folk remedies, however, varied in effectiveness and were not without the risk of adverse effects. Some of the herbs used at times to terminate pregnancy are poisonous.

A list of plants which cause abortion was provided in De viribus herbarum, an 11th-century herbal written in the form of a poem, the authorship of which is incorrectly attributed to Aemilius Macer. Among them were rue, Italian catnip, savory, sage, soapwort, cyperus, white and black hellebore, and pennyroyal. Physicians in the Islamic world during the medieval period documented the use of abortifacients, commenting on their effectiveness and prevalence.

Colonial Americans were advised to use careful measurements in a recipe by Benjamin Franklin for an abortifacient. He used the recipe as an example in a book he published to teach mathematics and many useful skills, and calls the recipe a solution to "the misfortune" of an unwanted pregnancy for "unmarry'd women". Franklin was following a tradition that had existed in England and Europe.

King's American Dispensatory of 1898 recommended a mixture of brewer's yeast and pennyroyal tea as "a safe and certain abortive". Pennyroyal has been known to cause complications when used as an abortifacient. In 1978 a pregnant woman from Colorado died after consuming 2 tablespoonfuls of pennyroyal essential oil which is known to be toxic. In 1994 a pregnant woman, unaware of an ectopic pregnancy that needed immediate medical care, drank a tea containing pennyroyal extract to induce abortion without medical help. She later died as a result of the untreated ectopic pregnancy, mistaking the symptoms for the abortifacient working.

For thousands of years, tansy has been taken in early pregnancy to restore menstruation. It was first documented as an emmenagogue in St. Hildegard of Bingen's De simplicis medicinae.

A variety of juniper, known as savin, was mentioned frequently in European writings. In one case in England, a rector from Essex was said to have procured it for a woman he had impregnated in 1574; in another, a man advised his pregnant girlfriend to use black hellebore and savin be boiled together and drunk in milk, or else chopped madder boiled in beer. Other substances reputed to have been used by the English include Spanish fly, opium, watercress seed, iron sulphate, and iron chloride. Another mixture, not abortifacient, but rather intended to relieve missed abortion, contained dittany, hyssop, and hot water.

The root of worm fern, called "prostitute root" in French, was used in France and Germany; it was also recommended by a Greek physician in the 1st century. In German folk medicine, there was also an abortifacient tea, which included marjoram, thyme, parsley, and lavender. Other preparations of unspecified origin included crushed ants, the saliva of camels, and the tail hairs of black-tailed deer dissolved in the fat of bears.

=== Attitudes towards abortion ===
The Stoics believed the fetus to be plantlike in nature, and not an animal until the moment of birth, when it finally breathed air. They therefore found abortion morally acceptable.

Aristotle wrote that, "[T]he line between lawful and unlawful abortion will be marked by the fact of having sensation and being alive." Before that point was reached, Aristotle did not regard abortion as the killing of something human. Aristotle considered the embryo to gain a human soul at 40 days if male and 90 days if female; before that, it had vegetable and animal souls.

The Oath, ascribed to Hippocrates, forbade the use of pessaries to induce abortion. Modern scholarship suggests that pessaries were banned because they were reported to cause vaginal ulcers. This specific prohibition has been interpreted by some medical scholars as prohibiting abortion in a broader sense than by pessary.

One such interpretation was by Scribonius Largus, a Roman medical writer: "Hippocrates, who founded our profession, laid the foundation for our discipline by an oath in which it was proscribed not to give a pregnant woman a kind of medicine that expels the embryo or fetus." Other medical scholars disagree, believing that Hippocrates sought to discourage physicians from trying dangerous methods to abort a fetus. This may be born out by the fact that the oath originally also prohibited surgery (at the time, it was far more dangerous, and surgeons were a separate profession from physicians).

Soranus acknowledges two parties among physicians: those who would not perform abortions, citing the Hippocratic Oath, and the other party, his own. Soranus recommended abortion in cases involving health complications as well as emotional immaturity, and provided detailed suggestions in his work Gynecology.

In the Roman Republic and Principate, abortion was punished only when it violated the father's right to make decisions about rearing his offspring. The Stoics did not view the fetus as a person, and the Romans did not punish abortion as homicide. Following a divorce, a pregnant woman could choose to have an abortion based on the view that "the embryo formed part of the mother's own organs." Although abortion was commonly accepted in the Roman Empire, around 211 AD the emperors Septimius Severus and Caracalla banned abortion as infringing on parental rights; temporary exile was the punishment.

The 3rd-century legal compilation Pauli sententiae (attributed to Julius Paulus) wrote: "Those who give an abortifacient or a love potion, and do not do this deceitfully, nevertheless, [because] this sets a bad example, the humiliores will be banned to a mine, and the honestiores will be banned to an island after having forfeited (part of) their property, and if on account of that a woman or man perishes, then they [Pharr: the giver] will receive the death penalty." Paulus distinguishes between punishments for the upper and lower classes (honestiores and humiliores) but seems to refer more to the killing of the woman who takes the abortifacient rather than to the killing of the fetus itself.

The Roman jurist Ulpian wrote in the Digest: "An unborn child is considered being born, as far as it concerns his profits," meaning that in Roman inheritance law a posthumous child was entitled to the same share of its predeceased father's estate as children born before his death. Abortion continued to be practiced "with little or no sense of shame".

==== Christianity ====
The early Christian work called the Didache (before 100 AD) says: "do not murder a child by abortion or kill a new-born infant." Tertullian, a 2nd- and 3rd-century Christian theologian, argued that abortion should be performed only in cases in which abnormal positioning of the fetus in the womb would endanger the life of the pregnant woman. Saint Augustine, in Enchiridion, makes passing mention of surgical procedures being performed to remove fetuses which have died in utero.

Saint Augustine believed that abortion of a fetus animatus, a fetus with human limbs and shape, was murder. However, his beliefs on earlier-stage abortion were similar to Aristotle's, though he could neither deny nor affirm whether such partially formed fetuses would be resurrected as full people at the time of the Second Coming.

- "Now who is there that is not rather disposed to think that unformed abortions perish, like seeds that have never fructified?"
- "And therefore the following question may be very carefully inquired into and discussed by learned men, though I do not know whether it is in man's power to resolve it: At what time the infant begins to live in the womb: whether life exists in a latent form before it manifests itself in the motions of the living being. To deny that the young who are cut out limb by limb from the womb, lest if they were left there dead the mother should die too, have never been alive, seems too audacious."

The Leges Henrici Primi, written c. 1115, prescribes compensation for a woman or her relatives if another person causes her to miscarry, and prescribes penance (3 years if the abortion occurs before quickening, 7 years after quickening) if the pregnant woman aborts her pregnancy; the latter punishment applied only to women whose abortion resulted from a desire to conceal illicit sex. "Quickening", a term often used interchangeably with "ensoulment" or "animation", was associated with the first movement of the fetus in utero. This movement is generally felt by women sometime in the third to fifth month of pregnancy. Midwives who performed abortions were accused of committing witchcraft in Malleus Maleficarum (The Hammer of Witches), published in 1487 as a witch-hunting manual in Germany.

In 1591, Pope Gregory XIV published new regulations in the apostolic constitution Sedes Apostolica (Note: The relevant part of this constitution is reproduced in Gasparri, Pietro, ed. (1926). "173. Gregorius XIV, const. Sedes Apostolica, 31 maii 1591.". Codicis Iuris Canonici Fontes. Vol. I:1–364. (ref. given for the constitution: Bull. Rom., tom. 5, I, p. 275, 276). Rome: Typis Polyglottis Vaticanis. pp. 330–331.) (published on 31 May 1591), limiting the punishments to abortion of a "formed" fetus: "When abortion was neither 'an issue of homicide or of an animate fetus,' Gregory thought it 'more useful' to return to the less-harsh penalties [for early abortion] of the holy canons and profane laws: those who abort an inanimatus [soulless] will not be guilty of true homicide because they have not killed a human being in actuality; clerics involved in abortions will have committed mortal sin but will not incur irregularity". After 1591, Gregory's Sedes apostolica "remained in effect for almost three centuries, being revised only in 1869 by Pius IX".

With his 1869 bull Apostolicae Sedis moderationi, Pope Pius IX rescinded Gregory XIV's not-yet-animated fetus exception with regard to the spiritual penalty of excommunication. From then on this penalty was incurred automatically through abortion at any stage of pregnancy.

There has been considerable debate among modern Biblical experts on the status of fetuses in the Hebrew Bible. Exodus 21:22 describes a situation in which two men fight and injure a pregnant woman, causing her unborn child to leave her womb. The Masoretic Text uses the Hebrew term "veyats'u yeladeha" (וְיָצְאוּ יְלָדֶיהָ) to refer to the child coming out; different English versions translate this term either as a "premature birth" or as a "miscarriage". The Spanish translation published by the Sociedad Biblica Catolica Internacional (SOBICAIN) uses the term "aborto", clearly indicating the demise of the fetus. If no additional harm follows, then the perpetrator must pay a fine. Only if there is additional harm must the perpetrator be punished with equal harm (i.e. eye for an eye). Commentators such as Bruce Waltke have presented this verse as evidence that God does not value a fetus as a human being, and/or evidence that a fetus has no soul. C. Everett Koop disagreed with this interpretation.

Another Old Testament passage that has been subject to debate on abortion is Numbers 5:11-31, which describes the test of an unfaithful wife. If a man is suspicious of his wife's fidelity, he would take her to the high priest. The priest would make a substance for the woman to drink made from water and "dust from the floor of the tabernacle". If she had been unfaithful, "her belly will swell and her thigh will rot, and she will become a curse," but if she was innocent, the drink would have no effect. Some modern English translations such as the 2011 revision of the New International Version and the New Revised Standard Version render "her thigh will rot" as "to miscarry", while other translations such as the English Standard Version and the New King James Version reject this view. Some have challenged the translation "to miscarry" on the grounds that the Biblical passage does not state that the unfaithful wife is pregnant.

Currently, the Roman Catholic, Eastern Orthodox, and Oriental Orthodox churches oppose abortion from conception.

== Modern era ==
=== Criminalization ===
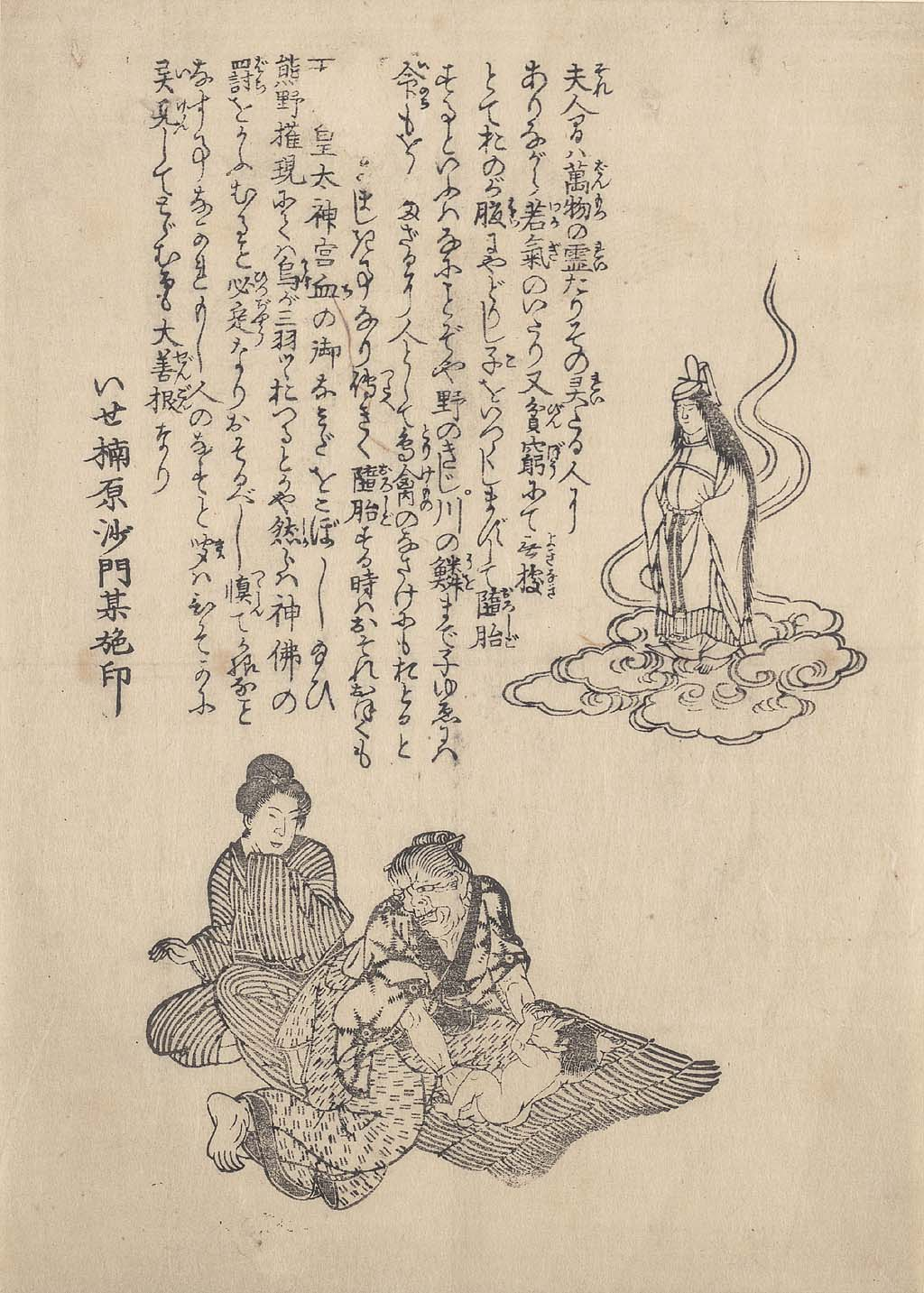
"Admonition against abortion". Late 19th-century Japanese Ukiyo-e woodblock print.

19th-century medicine saw tremendous advances in the fields of surgery, anaesthesia, and sanitation. Social attitudes towards abortion shifted in the context of a backlash against midwifery.

Abortion had previously been widely practiced and legal under common law in early pregnancy (until quickening, which is typically at 16-20 weeks into the pregnancy). In the 18th century, William Blackstone wrote, in his Commentaries on the Laws of England, quote: "if a woman is quick with child, and by a potion, or otherwise, killeth it in her womb; or if any one beat her, whereby the child dieth in her body, and she is delivered of a dead child; this, though not murder, was by the antient law homicide or manslaughter. But at present it is not looked upon in quite so atrocious a light, though it remains a very heinous misdemeanor” It was not until the 19th century that the English-speaking world passed laws against abortion at all stages of pregnancy, as opposed to merely prohibiting it from "quickening" onward.

There were a number of factors that contributed to this shift in opinion about abortion in the early 19th century. In the United States, where physicians were the leading advocates of abortion criminalization laws, some of them argued that advances in medical knowledge showed that quickening was neither more nor less crucial in the process of gestation than any other step, and thus if one opposes abortion after quickening, one should oppose it before quickening as well.

Practical reasons also influenced the medical field to impose anti-abortion laws. For one, abortion providers tended to be untrained and not members of medical societies. In an age where the leading doctors in the nation were attempting to standardize the medical profession, these "irregulars" were considered a nuisance to public health. The "irregulars" were also disliked by the more formalized medical profession because they were competition, and often cheap competition. Though the physicians' campaign against abortion began in the early 1800s, little change was made in the United States until after the Civil War.

The English law on abortion was first codified in legislation under sections 1 and 2 of Malicious Shooting or Stabbing Act 1803. The Bill was proposed by the Lord Chief Justice of England and Wales, Edward Law, 1st Baron Ellenborough to clarify the law relating to abortion and was the first law to explicitly outlaw it. The Act provided that it was an offence for any person to perform or cause an abortion. The punishment for performing or attempting to perform a post quickening abortion was the death penalty (section 1) and otherwise was transportation for fourteen years (section 2). In the 19th-century United States, there was little regulation of abortion, in the tradition of English common law, pre quickening abortions were considered at most a misdemeanor. These cases proved difficult to prosecute as the testimony of the mother was usually the only means to determine when quickening had occurred.

The law was amended in 1828 and 1837 – the latter removed the distinction between women who were quick with child (late pregnancy) and those who were not. It also eliminated the death penalty as a possible punishment. The latter half of the 19th century saw abortion become increasingly punished. One writer justified this by claiming that the number of abortions among married women had increased markedly since 1840. The Offences against the Person Act 1861 created a new preparatory offence of procuring poison or instruments with intent to procure abortion. During the 1860s however abortion services were available in New York, New Orleans, Cincinnati, Louisville, Cleveland, Chicago and Indianapolis; with estimates of one abortion for every 4 live births.

Anti-abortion statutes began to appear in the United States from the 1820s. A Connecticut law in 1821 targeted apothecaries who sold poisons to women for purposes of abortion, and New York made post-quickening abortions a felony and pre-quickening abortions a misdemeanor in 1829. Criminalization accelerated from the late 1860s, through the efforts of concerned legislators, doctors, and the American Medical Association. In 1873, the Comstock Law prohibited any methods of production or publication of information pertaining to the procurement of abortion, the prevention of conception, and the prevention of venereal disease, even to students of medicine. By 1909, the penalty for violating these laws became a $5000 fine and up to five years imprisonment. By 1910, nearly every state had anti-abortion laws; these were unevenly enforced at best.

=== 19th and 20th century abortion methods ===
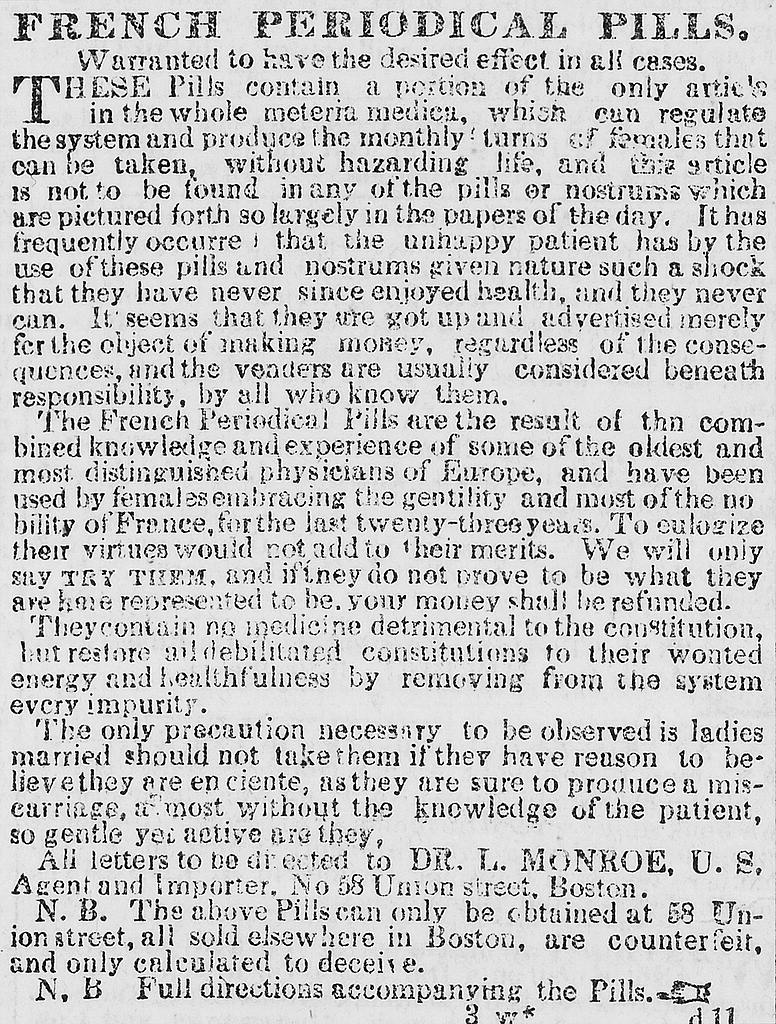
An 1845 ad for "French Periodical Pills" warns against use by women who might be "en ciente [sic]" ("enceinte" is French for "pregnant").

In New York, surgical abortion in 1800s carried a death rate of 30% regardless of hospital setting, and the American Medical Association launched an anti-abortion campaign that resulted in abortion becoming the exclusive domain of doctors. A paper published in 1870 on the abortion services to be found in Syracuse, New York, concluded that the method most often practiced there during this time was to flush inside of the uterus with injected water. The article's author, Ely Van de Warkle, claimed this procedure was affordable even to a maid, as a man in town offered it for $10 on an installment plan. Other prices which 19th-century abortion providers are reported to have charged were much more steep. In Britain, it could cost from 10 to 50 guineas, or 5% of the yearly income of a lower middle class household.

From 1870 there was a steady decline in fertility in England, linked by some commentators not to a rise in the use of artificial contraception but to more traditional methods such as withdrawal and abstinence. This was linked to changes in the perception of the relative costs of childrearing. Of course, women did find themselves with unwanted pregnancies. Abortifacients were discreetly advertised and there was a considerable body of folklore about methods of inducing miscarriages. Amongst working-class women violent purgatives were popular, pennyroyal, aloes and turpentine were all used. Other methods to induce miscarriage were very hot baths and gin, extreme exertion, a controlled fall down a flight of stairs, or veterinary medicines. So-called 'backstreet' abortionists were fairly common, although their bloody efforts could be fatal. Estimates of the number of illegal abortions performed in England varied widely: by one estimate, 100,000 women made efforts to procure a miscarriage in 1914, usually by drugs.

A rash of unexplained miscarriages in Sheffield, England were attributed to lead poisoning caused by the metal pipes which fed the city's water supply. Soon, women began using diachylon, a substance with a high concentration of lead, as an abortifacient. In 1898, a woman confessed to having used diachylon to induce a miscarriage. The use of diachylon became prevalent in the English Midlands up until World War I. Criminal investigation of an abortionist in Calgary, Alberta in 1894 revealed through chemical analysis that the concoction he had supplied to a man seeking an abortifacient contained Spanish fly.

Dr. Evelyn Fisher wrote of how women living in a mining town in Wales during the 1920s used candles intended for Roman Catholic ceremonies to dilate the cervix in an effort to self-induce abortion. Similarly, the use of candles and other objects, such as glass rods, penholders, curling irons, spoons, sticks, knives, and catheters was reported during the 19th century in the United States. Women of Jewish descent in Lower East Side, Manhattan are said to have carried the ancient Indian practice of sitting over a pot of steam into the early 20th century. Some commentators maintained that abortion remained a dangerous procedure into the early 20th century, more dangerous than childbirth until about 1930. But others have said that in the 19th century early abortions under the hygienic conditions in which midwives usually worked were relatively safe. In addition, some authors have written that, despite improved medical procedures, the period from the 1930s until legalization also saw more zealous enforcement of anti-abortion laws, and concomitantly an increasing control of abortion providers by organized crime.

=== Advertising for abortifacients and abortion services ===
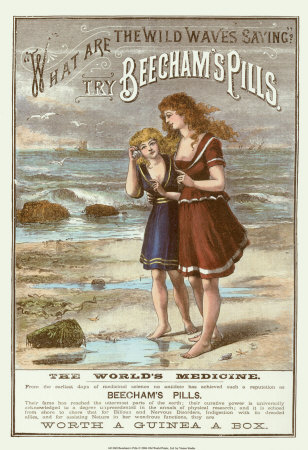
Suggestive advertisement for the use of Beecham's Pills as an abortifacient. The text at the bottom notes that the pills "assist nature in her wondrous functions".

Despite bans enacted on both sides of the Atlantic Ocean, access to abortion continued, as the disguised advertisement of abortion services, abortion-inducing devices, and abortifacient medicines in the Victorian era would seem to suggest. Apparent print ads of this nature were found in the United States, the United Kingdom, and Canada. A British Medical Journal writer who replied to newspaper ads peddling relief to women who were "temporarily indisposed" in 1868 found that over half of them were in fact promoting abortion.

A few examples of surreptitiously marketed abortifacients include "Farrer's Catholic Pills", "Hardy's Woman's Friend", "Dr. Peter's French Renovating Pills", "Lydia Pinkham's Vegetable Compound", and "Madame Drunette's Lunar Pills". Patent medicines which claimed to treat "female complaints" often contained such ingredients as pennyroyal, tansy, and savin. Abortifacient products were sold under the promise of "restor[ing] female regularity" and "removing from the system every impurity". In the vernacular of such advertising, "irregularity", "obstruction", "menstrual suppression", and "delayed period" were understood to be euphemistic references to the state of pregnancy. As such, some abortifacients were marketed as menstrual regulatives.

Beecham's Pills were marketed primarily as a laxative from 1842. They were invented by Thomas Beecham from St Helens, Lancashire, England. The pills were a combination of aloe, ginger, and soap, with some other more minor ingredients. The popularity of the pills produced a wide range of testimonials that were used in advertising. The poet William Topaz McGonagall wrote a poem advertising the pills, giving his recommendation in verse. Beecham's expenditure on advertising went from £22,000 to £95,000 in the 1880s. An 1897 advertisement in the Christian Herald edition for Queen Victoria's Diamond Jubilee said: "Worth a guinea a box. Beecham's Pills for all bilious and nervous disorders such as Sick Headache, Constipation, Weak Stomach, Impaired Digestion, Disordered Liver and Female Ailments. The sale is now 6 million boxes per annum." The text was printed alongside a picture of a young woman at a beach and was captioned "What are the wild waves saying? Try Beecham's Pills."

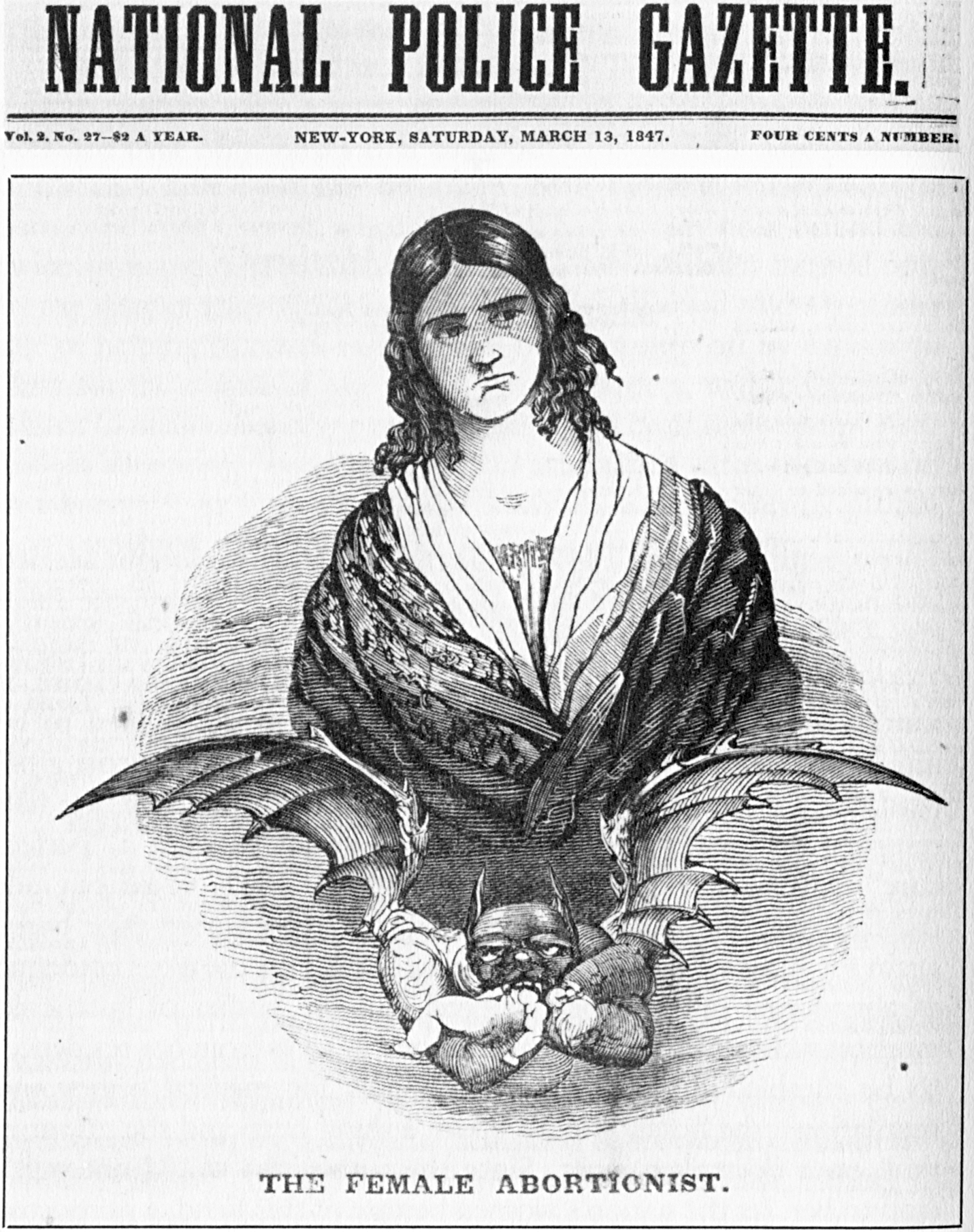
"The Female Abortionist". Madame Restell is portrayed as a villainess in an 1847 copy of the National Police Gazette.

"Old Dr. Gordon's Pearls of Health", produced by a drug company in Montreal, "cure[d] all suppressions and irregularities" if "used monthly". However, a few ads explicitly warned against the use of their product by women who were expecting, or listed miscarriage as its inevitable side effect. The copy for "Dr. Peter's French Renovating Pills" advised, "... pregnant females should not use them, as they invariably produce a miscarriage ...", and both "Dr. Monroe's French Periodical Pills" and "Dr. Melveau's Portuguese Female Pills" were "sure to produce a miscarriage". F.E. Karn, a man from Toronto, in 1901 cautioned women who thought themselves pregnant not to use the pills he advertised as "Friar's French Female Regulator" because they would "speedily restore menstrual secretions." Historian Ann Hibner Koblitz comments that "Nineteenth-century customers would have understood this 'warning' exactly as the sellers intended: as an advertisement for an abortifacient preparation."

In the mid 1930s abortifacients drugs were marketed in the United States to women by various companies under various names such as Molex Pills and Cote Pills. Since birth control devices and abortifacients were illegal to market and sell at the time, they were offered to women who were "delayed". The recommended dosage constituted seven grains of ergotin a day. These pills generally contained ingredients such as ergotin, aloes, Black Hellebore. The efficacy and safety of these pills are unknown. In 1940 the FTC deemed them unsafe and ineffective and demanded that these companies cease and desist selling these products.

A well-known example of a Victorian-era abortionist was Madame Restell, or Ann Lohman, who over a forty-year period illicitly provided both surgical abortion and abortifacient pills in the northern United States. She began her business in New York during the 1830s, and, by the 1840s, had expanded to include franchises in Boston and Philadelphia. It is estimated that by 1870 her annual expenditure on advertising alone was $60,000. Because of her reputation, Restellism became a synonym for abortion.

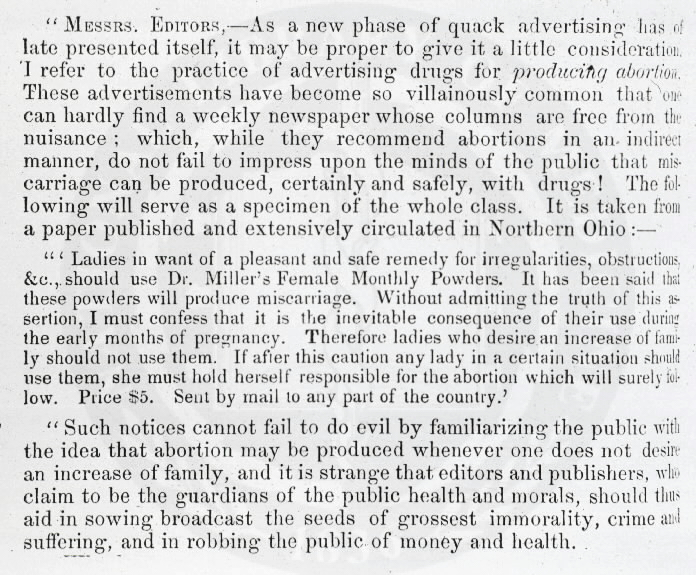
"Dr. Miller's Female Monthly Powders" ad copy reprinted in an 1858 article condemning such advertising

One ad for Restell's medical services, printed in the New York Sun, promised that she could offer the "strictest confidence on complaints incidental to the female frame" and that her "experience and knowledge in the treatment of cases of female irregularity, [was] such as to require but a few days to effect a perfect cure". Another, addressed to married women, asked the question, "Is it desirable, then, for parents to increase their families, regardless of consequences to themselves, or the well-being of their offspring, when a simple, easy, healthy, and certain remedy is within our control?" Advertisements for the "Female Monthly Regulating Pills" she also sold vowed to resolve "all cases of suppression, irregularity, or stoppage of the menses, however obdurate". Madame Restell was an object of criticism in both the respectable and penny presses. She was first arrested in 1841, but, it was her final arrest by Anthony Comstock which led to her suicide on the day of her trial April 1, 1878.

Such advertising aroused criticisms of quackery and immorality. The safety of many nostrums was suspect and the efficacy of others non-existent. Horace Greeley, in a New York Herald editorial written in 1871, denounced abortion and its promotion as the "infamous and unfortunately common crime– so common that it affords a lucrative support to a regular guild of professional murderers, so safe that its perpetrators advertise their calling in the newspapers". Although the paper in which Greeley wrote accepted such advertisements, others, such as the New York Tribune, refused to print them. Elizabeth Blackwell, the first woman to obtain a Doctor of Medicine in the United States, also lamented how such ads led to the contemporary synonymity of "female physician" with "abortionist".

=== Turning point in abortion legislation ===
The feminist Stella Browne was a major figure in the campaign for the liberalization of abortion law.

Abortifacient advertising was highly effective in the United States, though apparently less so across the Atlantic. Contemporary estimates of mid-19th century abortion rates in the United States suggest between 20% and 25% of all pregnancies in the United States during that era ended in abortion. This era also saw a marked shift in those who were obtaining abortions. Before the start of the 19th century, most abortions were sought by unmarried women who had become pregnant out of wedlock. But, out of 54 abortion cases published in American medical journals between 1839 and 1880, over half were sought by married women, and of the married women well over 60 percent already had at least one child.

Many feminists of the era were opposed to abortion. In The Revolution, operated by Elizabeth Cady Stanton and Susan B. Anthony, an anonymous contributor signing "A" wrote in 1869 about the subject, arguing that instead of merely attempting to pass a law against abortion, the root cause must also be addressed. Simply passing an anti-abortion law would, the writer stated, "be only mowing off the top of the noxious weed, while the root remains. [...] No matter what the motive, love of ease, or a desire to save from suffering the unborn innocent, the woman is awfully guilty who commits the deed. It will burden her conscience in life, it will burden her soul in death; But oh! thrice guilty is he who drove her to the desperation which impelled her to the crime." To many feminists of this era, abortion was regarded as an undesirable necessity forced upon women by thoughtless men. Even the "free love" wing of the feminist movement refused to advocate abortion and treated the practice as an example of the hideous extremes to which modern marriage was driving women. Marital rape and the seduction of unmarried women were societal ills which feminists believed caused the need to abort, as men did not respect women's right to abstinence.

Socialist feminists tended to be more sympathetic to the need for abortion options for the poor, and indeed socialist feminist doctors, such as Marie Equi, Madeleine Pelletier, and William J. Robinson, themselves performed low-cost or free abortions for poor women.

=== Abortion law reform campaign ===
The movement to liberalize abortion laws emerged in the 1920s and '30s as part of rising feminist activism that had already resulted in victories in the area of birth control. Campaigners including Marie Stopes in England and Margaret Sanger in the US had succeeded in bringing the issue into the open, and birth control clinics were established which offered family planning advice and contraceptive methods to women in need.

In 1929, the Infant Life Preservation Act was passed in Britain, which amended the law (Offences against the Person Act 1861) so that an abortion carried out in good faith, for the sole purpose of preserving the life of the mother, would not be an offence.

Stella Browne was a leading birth control campaigner, who increasingly began to venture into the more contentious issue of abortion in the 1930s. Browne's beliefs were heavily influenced by the work of Havelock Ellis, Edward Carpenter and other sexologists. She came to strongly believe that working women should have the choice to become pregnant and to terminate their pregnancy while they worked in the horrible circumstances surrounding a pregnant woman who was still required to do hard labour during her pregnancy. In this case she argued that doctors should give free information about birth control to women who wanted to know about it. This would give women agency over their own circumstances and allow them to decide whether they wanted to be mothers or not.

In the late 1920s Browne began a speaking tour around England, providing information about her beliefs on the need for accessibility of information about birth control for women, women's health problems, problems related to puberty and sex education and high maternal morbidity rates among other topics. These talks urged women to take matters of their sexuality and their health into their own hands. She became increasingly interested in her view of the woman's right to terminate their pregnancies, and in 1929 she brought forward her lecture "The Right to Abortion" in front of the World Sexual Reform Congress in London. In 1931 Browne began to develop her argument for women's right to decide to have an abortion. She again began touring, giving lectures on abortion and the negative consequences that followed if women were unable to terminate pregnancies of their own choosing such as: suicide, injury, permanent invalidism, madness and blood-poisoning.

Aleck Bourne was acquitted for performing an abortion on a rape victim in 1938, a landmark case in the movement for abortion rights.

Another prominent feminist to influence abortion law was Emily Stowe. In the 19th century she was one of the first doctors to be tried for attempting an abortion procedure in Canada.

Other prominent feminists, including Frida Laski, Dora Russell, Joan Malleson and Janet Chance began to champion this cause – the cause broke dramatically into the mainstream in July 1932 when the British Medical Association council formed a committee to discuss making changes to the laws on abortion. On 17 February 1936, Janet Chance, Alice Jenkins and Joan Malleson established the Abortion Law Reform Association as the first advocacy organisation for abortion liberalization. The association promoted access to abortion in the United Kingdom and campaigned for the elimination of legal obstacles. In its first year ALRA recruited 35 members, and by 1939 had almost 400 members.

The ALRA was very active between 1936 and 1939 sending speakers around the country to talk about Labour and Equal Citizenship and attempted, though most often unsuccessfully, to have letters and articles published in newspapers. They became the most popular when a member of the ALRA's Medico-Legal Committee received the case of a fourteen-year-old girl who had been raped, and received a termination of this pregnancy from Dr. Joan Malleson, a progenitor of the ALRA. This case gained a lot of publicity. However, once the war began, the case was tucked away and the cause again lost its importance to the public.

In 1938, Joan Malleson precipitated one of the most influential cases in British abortion law when she referred a pregnant fourteen-year-old rape victim to gynaecologist Aleck Bourne. He performed an abortion, then illegal, and was put on trial on charges of procuring abortion. Bourne was eventually acquitted in Rex v Bourne as his actions were "an example of disinterested conduct in consonance with the highest traditions of the profession". This court case set a precedent that doctors could not be prosecuted for performing an abortion in cases where pregnancy would probably cause "mental and physical wreck".

Finally, the Birkett Committee, established in 1937 by the British government "to inquire into the prevalence of abortion, and the law relating thereto", recommended a change to abortion laws two years later. The intervention of World War II meant that all plans were shelved.

Another prominent figure in the reform of abortion laws was Dr. Morgentaler. Although born in Poland he made a name for himself in Canada, opening multiple illegal abortion clinics in Toronto, Ontario.

=== Liberalization of abortion law ===
==== Canada ====
Prior to 1969, abortion was considered a crime for which the maximum punishment was life imprisonment for the doctor performing the abortion and two years imprisonment for the woman receiving the abortion. Abortion remained illegal until 1988, when the Supreme Court of Canada overruled the criminal punishments for abortion. Abortion remains a hotly debated topic. As of 2008 in Canada only 1–2% of abortions were pharmaceutically induced. After much controversy, starting in 2017 abortion pills could be used legally in Canada.

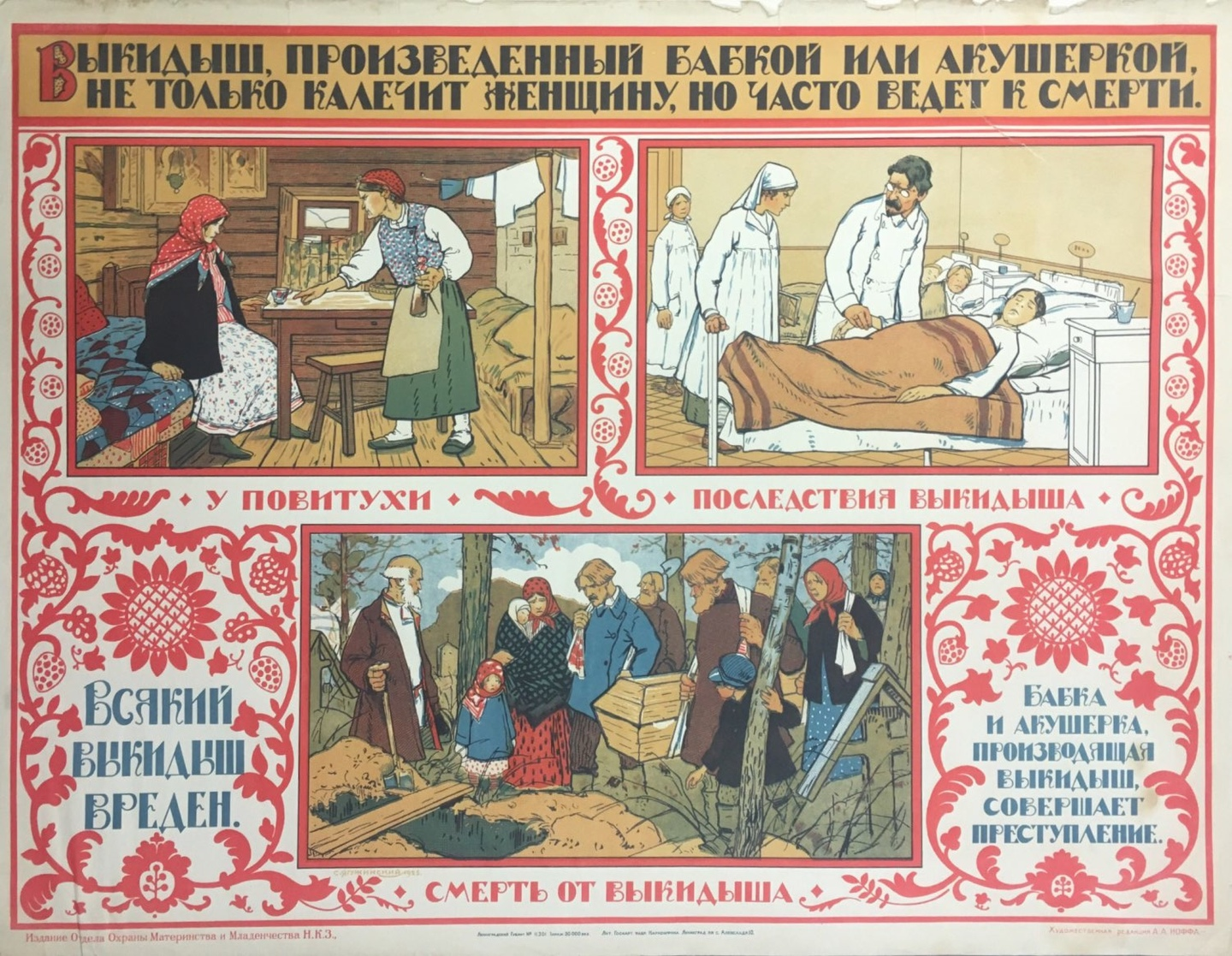
The Soviet Union first legalized abortion in 1920. The poster c. 1925 warns against unsafe abortion. Title translation: "Abortions performed by either self-taught midwives or obstetricians not only maim the woman, they also often lead to death."

==== Russia ====
The Russian Soviet Federative Socialist Republic was the first government to legalize abortion and make it available on request, often for no cost. The Soviet government hoped to provide access to abortion in a safe environment performed by a trained doctor instead of babki. While this campaign was extremely effective in the urban areas (as much as 75% of abortions in Moscow were performed in hospitals by 1925), it had much less effect on rural regions where there was neither access to doctors, transportation, or both and where women relied on traditional medicine. In the countryside in particular, women continued to see babki, midwives, hairdressers, nurses, and others for the procedure after abortion was legalized in the Soviet Union.

From 1936 until 1955 the Soviet Union made abortion illegal (except for medically recommended cases) again, stemming largely from Joseph Stalin's worries about population growth. Stalin wanted to encourage population growth, as well as place a stronger emphasis on the importance of the family unit to communism.

==== Spain ====
During the Spanish Civil War, on 25 December 1936, in Catalonia, free abortion was legalized during the first 12 weeks of pregnancy with a decree signed by Josep Tarradellas, First Minister of the Government of Catalonia, and published on 9 January 1937 (Diari Oficial de la Generalitat de Catalunya, núm.9).

==== Great Britain ====
In Britain, the Abortion Law Reform Association continued its campaigning after the War, and this, combined with broad social changes brought the issue of abortion back into the political arena in the 1960s. President of the Royal College of Obstetricians and Gynaecologists John Peel chaired the committee advising the British Government on what became the 1967 Abortion Act. On the grounds of reducing the amount of disease and death associated with illegal abortion, the Abortion Act allowed for legal abortion on a number of grounds, including to prevent grave permanent injury to the woman's physical or mental health, to avoid injury to the physical or mental health of the woman or her existing child(ren) if the pregnancy was still under 28 weeks, or if the child was likely to be severely physically or mentally handicapped. The free provision of abortions was provided through the National Health Service.

==== United States ====
In America an abortion reform movement emerged in the 1960s. In 1963, the Society for Humane Abortion was formed, providing women with information on how to obtain and perform abortions. In 1964 Gerri Santoro of Connecticut died trying to obtain an illegal abortion and her photo became the symbol of the abortion rights movement. Some women's rights activist groups developed their own skills to provide abortions to women who could not obtain them elsewhere. As an example, in Chicago, a group known as "Jane" operated a floating abortion clinic throughout much of the 1960s. Women seeking the procedure would call a designated number and be given instructions on how to find "Jane".

In the late 1960s, a number of organizations were formed to mobilize opinion both against and for the legalization of abortion. The forerunner of the NARAL Pro-Choice America was formed in 1969 to oppose restrictions on abortion and expand access to abortion. In late 1973 NARAL became the National Abortion Rights Action League. The American Medical Association, the American Bar Association, the American Academy of Pediatrics, the California Medical Association, the California Bar Association, and numerous other groups announced support behind new laws that would protect doctors from criminal prosecution if they performed abortions under rigid hospital controls. In 1967, Colorado became the first state to decriminalize a doctor performing an abortion in cases of rape, incest, or in which pregnancy would lead to permanent physical disability of the woman.

A bipartisan majority in the California legislature supported a new law introduced by Democratic state senator Anthony Beilenson, the "Therapeutic Abortion Act". Catholic clergy were strongly opposed but Catholic lay people were divided and non-Catholics strongly supported the proposal. Governor Ronald Reagan consulted with his father-in-law, a prominent surgeon who supported the law. He also consulted with James Cardinal McIntyre, the Catholic archbishop of Los Angeles. The archbishop strongly opposed any legalization of abortion and he convinced Reagan to announce he would veto the proposed law since the draft allowed abortions in the case of birth defects. The legislature dropped that provision and Reagan signed the law, which decriminalized abortions when done to protect the health of the mother. The expectation was that abortions would not become more numerous but would become much safer under hospital conditions. In 1968 the first full year under the new law there were 5,018 abortions in California. The numbers grew exponentially and stabilized at about 100,000 annually by the 1970s. 99.2% of California women who applied for an abortion were granted one. One out of every three pregnancies was ended by illegal abortion. The key factor was the sudden emergence of a woman's movement that introduced a very new idea—women had a basic right to control their bodies and could choose to have an abortion or not. Reagan by 1980 found his support among anti-abortion religious groups and said he was too new as governor to make a wise decision.

In 1970, Hawaii became the first state to legalize abortions on the request of the woman, and New York repealed its 1830 law and allowed abortions up to the 24th week of pregnancy. Similar laws were soon passed in Alaska and Washington. A law in Washington, D.C., which allowed abortion to protect the life or health of the woman, was challenged in the Supreme Court in 1971 in United States v. Vuitch. The court upheld the law, deeming that "health" meant "psychological and physical well-being", essentially allowing abortion in Washington, DC. By the end of 1972, 13 states had a law similar to that of Colorado, while Mississippi allowed abortion in cases of rape or incest only and Alabama and Massachusetts allowed abortions only in cases where the woman's physical health was endangered.

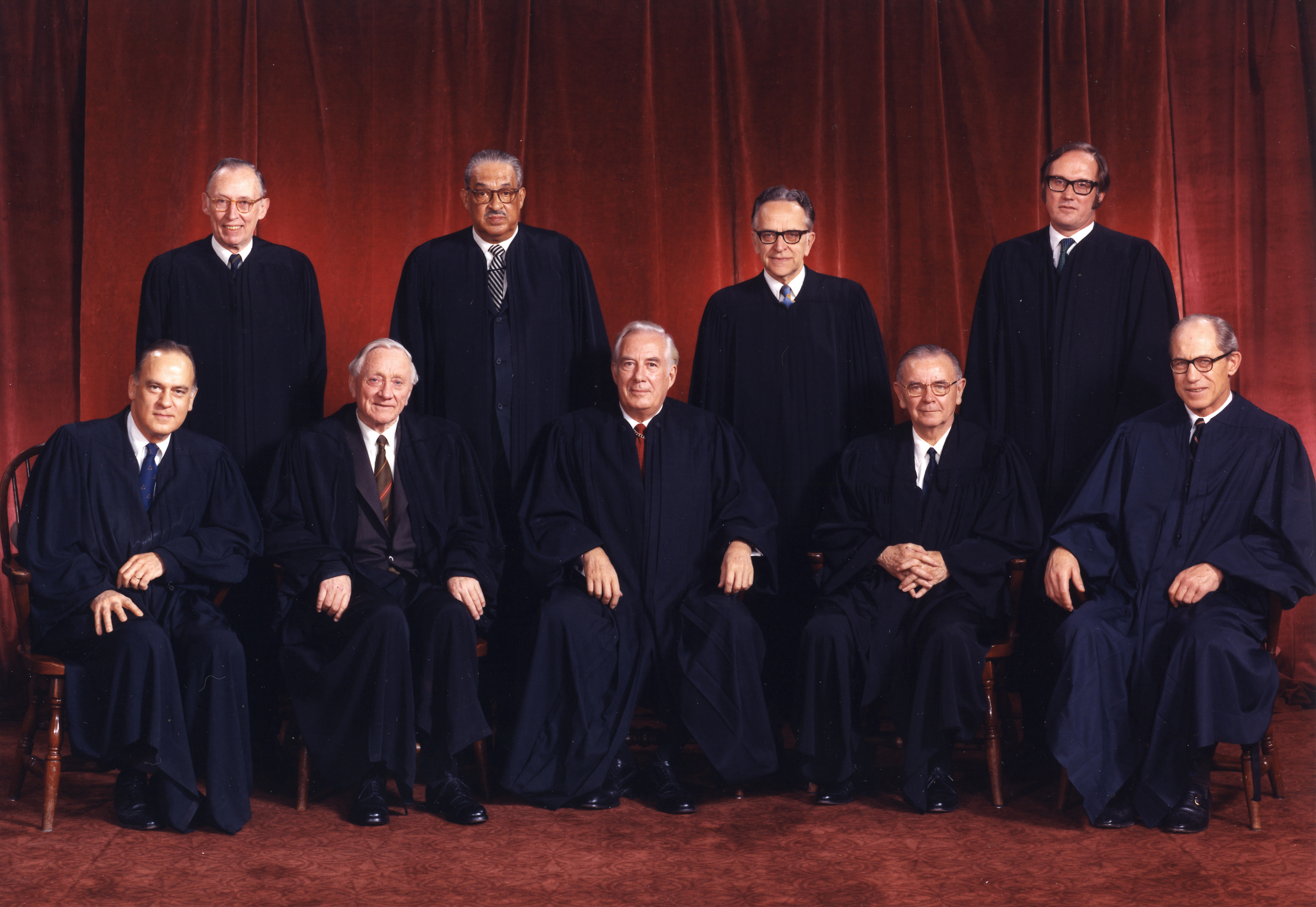
The United States Supreme Court membership in 1973 at the time of Roe v. Wade

The landmark judicial ruling of the Supreme Court in Roe v. Wade ruled that a Texas statute forbidding abortion except when necessary to save the life of the mother was unconstitutional. The immediate result was that all state laws to the contrary were null. The Court arrived at its decision by concluding that the issue of abortion and abortion rights falls under the right to privacy. The Court held that a right to privacy existed and included the right to have an abortion. The court found that a mother had a right to abortion until viability, a point to be determined by the abortion doctor. After viability a woman can obtain an abortion for health reasons, which the Court defined broadly to include psychological well-being.

From the 1970s, and the spread of second-wave feminism, abortion and reproductive rights became unifying issues among various women's rights groups in Canada, the United States, the Netherlands, Britain, Norway, France, Germany, and Italy.

On June 24, 2022, Roe v. Wade was overturned by the Supreme Court in a 6–3 decision. The ruling was part of Dobbs v. Jackson Women's Health Organization, a decision of the Supreme Court that also overturned Planned Parenthood v. Casey, another case of the Supreme Court regarding abortion.

In the United States today, after Dobbs v. Jackson Women's Health Organization, many states have banned abortion and target providers of abortions. In these states where abortion is banned, OBGYNs have been barred from offering abortions or just do not offer the services, except in very limited and certain circumstances, and do not even provide their patients with referrals to other clinicians or online resources involving abortion. The reasoning for not offering the services stems from many of the institutions that employ these OBGYNs having policies against performing abortions or terminating a pregnancy, which imposes too many legal regulations involving abortion care. OBGYNs have stated that their practices have been impacted and that their relationships with their patients have become worse since the decision on Dobbs was made.

Abortion restrictions are not new, but have increased and spread to places where they were not before. Today, there has been an increase in the amount of laws that restrict abortion care in a greater amount of ways that previously seen, and there has been a trend toward abortion restrictive laws and legislature. Negative framing around abortion has contributed to today's trend toward anti-abortion legislature. The abortion battle in the United States can be seen as largely a battle of competing ideologies. Anti-abortion advocates believe life begins at conception, so legalized abortion is a threat to social, moral, and religious values. However, pro-abortion advocates view legalized abortion as a woman's control over her body and the access to safe reproductive care.

==== France ====
In France social perceptions of abortion started to change. In the first half of the 19th century, abortion was viewed as the last resort for pregnant but unwed women. As writers began to write about abortion in terms of family planning for married women, the practice of abortion was reconceptualized as a logical solution to unwanted pregnancies resulting from ineffectual contraceptives. The formulation of abortion as a form of family planning for married women was made "thinkable" because both medical and non-medical practitioners agreed on the relative safety of the procedure.

=== Development of contemporary abortion methods ===
Although prototypes of the modern curette are referred to in ancient texts, the instrument which is used today was initially designed in France in 1723, but was not applied specifically to a gynecological purpose until 1842. Dilation and curettage has been practiced since the late 19th century.

The 20th century saw improvements in abortion technology, increasing its safety, and reducing its side-effects. Vacuum devices, first described by the Scottish obstetrician James Young Simpson in the 19th century, allowed for the development of suction-aspiration abortion. The process was improved by the Russian doctor S. G. Bykov in 1927, where the method was used during its period of liberal abortion laws from 1920 to 1936. The technology was also used in China and Japan before being introduced to Britain and the United States in the 1960s. The invention of the Karman cannula, a flexible plastic cannula which replaced earlier metal models in the 1970s, reduced the occurrence of perforation and made suction-aspiration methods possible under local anesthesia.

In 1971, Lorraine Rothman and Carol Downer, founding members of the feminist self-help movement, invented the Del-Em, a safe, cheap suction device that made it possible for people with minimal training to perform early abortions called menstrual extraction.

Swedish researchers began testing potential abortifacients in 1965. In 1968, the Swedish physician Lars Engström published a paper on a clinical trial, conducted at the women's clinic of Karolinska Hospital in Stockholm, of the compound F6103 on pregnant Swedish women with the aim of inducing abortion. It was the first clinical trial of an abortion pill to be conducted in Sweden. The paper, originally titled The Swedish Abortion Pill, was renamed to The Swedish Postconception Pill, due to the small number of induced abortions that occurred in the trial population. After these efforts were largely unsuccessful with F6103, the same researchers attempted to find an abortion pill with prostaglandins, capitalizing on the number of well-established prostaglandin scientists working in Sweden at the time; they were eventually awarded the 1982 Nobel Prize in Physiology for their work.

Abortions brought about by taking medications, known as medication abortions, became an alternative to surgical aboritons when prostaglandin analogs were introduced in the 1970s. One such analog is carboprost, which was successfully trialed in the United States in 1979.

In 1981, French pharmaceutical company Roussel-Uclaf developed the antiprogestogen mifepristone (also known as RU-486), which successfully induces abortions. It is typically taken in combination with misoprostol.

Intact dilation and extraction was developed by Dr. James McMahon in 1983. It resembles a procedure used in the 19th century to save a woman's life in cases of obstructed labor, in which the fetal skull was first punctured with a perforator, then crushed and extracted with a forceps-like instrument, known as a cranioclast.

Medication abortions became common when mifepristone was approved for use in China and France in 1988. Later it was approved in Great Britain in 1991, in Sweden in 1992, in Austria, Belgium, Denmark, Finland, Georgia, Germany, Greece, Iceland, Israel, Lichtenstein, Luxembourg, Netherlands, Russia, Spain, and Switzerland in 1999, in Norway, Taiwan, Tunisia, and the United States in 2000, and in 70 additional countries from 2001 to 2023.

During the mid-1990s in the United States the medical community showed renewed interest in manual vacuum aspiration as a method of early surgical abortion. This resurgence is due to technological advances that permit early pregnancy detection (as soon as a week after conception) and a growing popular demand for safe, effective early abortion options, both surgical and medical. An innovator in the development of early surgical abortion services is Jerry Edwards, a physician, who developed a protocol in which women are offered an abortion using a handheld vacuum syringe as soon as a positive pregnancy test is received. This protocol also allows the early detection of an ectopic pregnancy.

As of 2022, medication abortions are more common than surgical abortions in most places around the world.

== Abortion around the world ==
At various times abortion has been banned or restricted in countries around the world. Multiple scholars have noticed that in many cases, this has caused women to seek dangerous, illegal abortions underground or inspired trips abroad for "reproductive tourism". Half of the world's current deaths due to unsafe abortions occur in Asia.

Other authors have written that illegality has not always meant that abortions were unsafe. In the U.S. during the 19th century, early abortions under the hygienic conditions in which midwives usually worked were relatively safe.

=== China ===
In the early 1950s, the Chinese government made abortion illegal, with punishments for those who received or performed illegal abortions written into the law. These restrictions were seen as the government's way of emphasizing the importance of population growth.

As the decade went on, the laws were relaxed with the intent of reducing the number of deaths and lifelong injuries women sustained due to illegal abortions, as well as serving as a form of population control when used in conjunction with birth control. In the early 1980s, the state implemented a form of family planning which used abortion as a "back-up method"; and in 2005, there has been legislation trying to curb sex-selective abortion. As of 2009, although China had the highest number of abortions in the world, Russia had the highest rate in the world.

=== India ===
India enforced the Indian Penal Code from 1860 to 1971, criminalizing abortion and punishing both the practitioners and the women who sought out the procedure. As a result, women died in an attempt to obtain illegal abortions from unqualified midwives and "doctors". Abortion was made legal under specific circumstances in 1971, but as scholar S. Chandrasekhar notes, lower class women still find themselves at a greater risk of injury or death as a result of a botched abortion.

=== Iran ===
In 2023, the state reported 500,000 abortions performed in the year against 1.5 million births.

=== Japan ===
Japan is known today worldwide for its acceptance of abortion. Since induced abortion was legalized in 1948, The numbers of annual abortions increased to 1.17 million in 1955, making the induced abortion rate per 1000 women aged 15–49 50.2. The number dropped in 2005 to total number 289,000, making the abortion rate per 1000 women 10.2. Social factor and medical advance including contractive are giving effect to the number.

The Eugenics Protection Law of 1948 made elective abortion care legal up to twenty-two weeks' gestation so long as the woman's health was endangered; in 1949, this law was extended to consider the risk the child's birth would place on a woman's economic welfare. Originally, each case would have to be approved by a local eugenics council, but this was removed from the law in 1952, making the decision a private one between a woman and her physician and woman's partner. 。In 1996, the law was partly revised, and the name was changed to Maternal Health Act. The law still requires partner's agreement for abortion, in some cases leaving women who need abortion without.。

In 1964, the creation of the conservative right-wing nationalist political lobbying group called Seicho-no-Ie brought about a strong opposition to the abortion laws. This campaign reached its peak strength in the early 1980s, but ultimately failed in 1983.

=== Romania ===
In 1957, Romania legalized abortion, but in 1966, after a decline in the national birthrate, Nicolae Ceauşescu approved Decree 770, which criminalized abortion and encouraged childbirth. As a result of this decree, women in want of abortion turned to illegal procedures that caused the deaths of over 9,000 women and left unwanted children abandoned in orphanages. Abortion remained illegal until 1989, when the decree was overturned.

=== Thailand ===
There was intense public debate throughout the 1980s and 1990s over legal abortion reform. These debates portrayed abortion as un-Buddhist and anti-religious; abortion opponents ultimately labeled it as a form of Western corruption that was inherently anti-Thai and threatened the integrity of the nation. Despite this, in 2006, abortions became legal in cases of rape or foetal impairment. Mental health also became a factor in determining the legality of an abortion procedure. The strict regulations involved in qualifying for a legal abortion, however, cause approximately 300,000 women a year to seek illegal avenues according to scholar Andrea Whittaker, with the poorest undergoing the most dangerous of procedures.

== See also ==
- Susan B. Anthony abortion dispute
- George Lotrell Timanus
- Aleck Bourne
- Henry Katz
- Emily Stowe
- Henry Morgentaler
