= Beecham Group =

British pharmaceutical company, 1859–1989

The Beecham Group plc

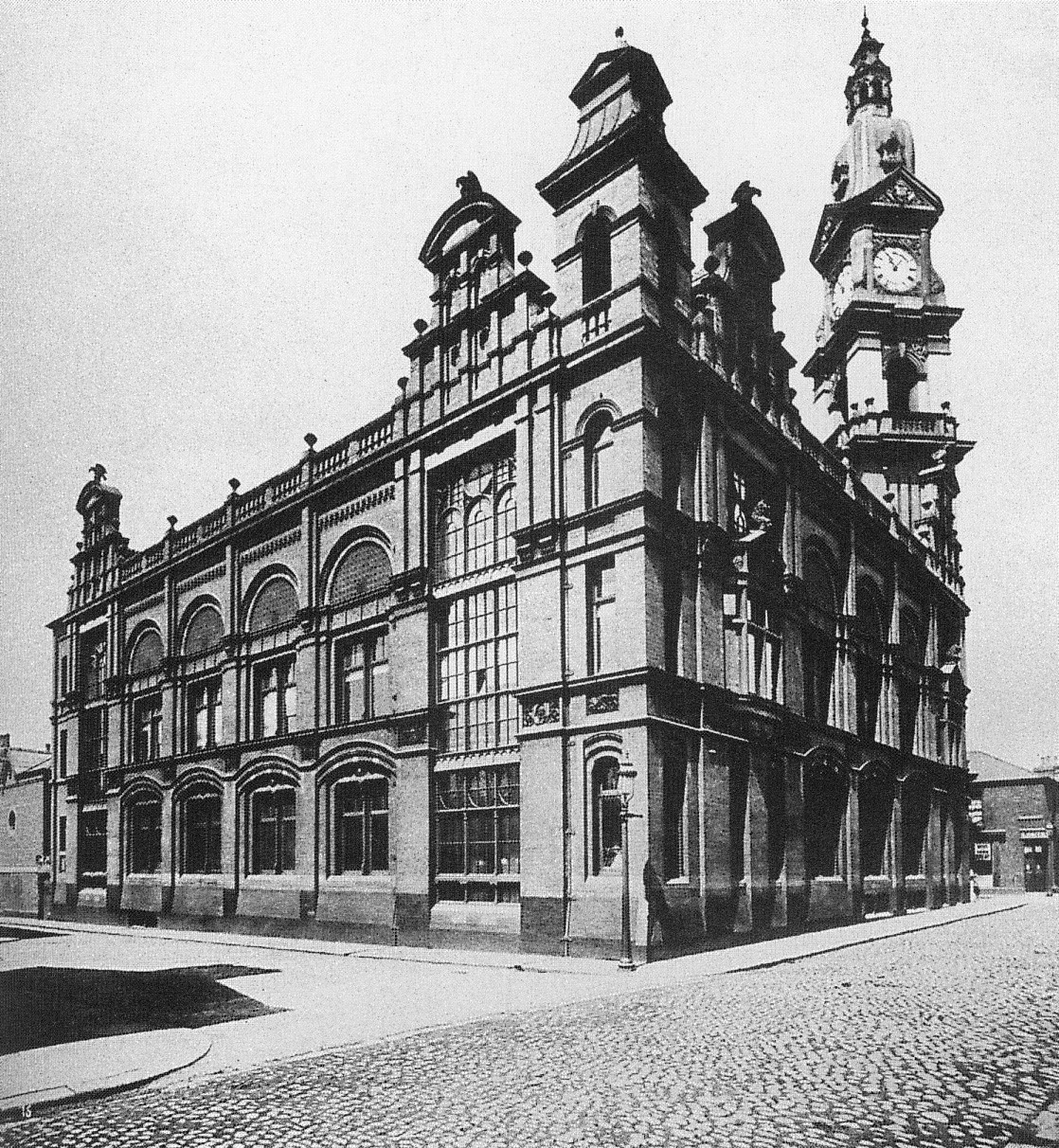
- Beecham's Clock Tower built in 1877; the building still stands in St Helens, Merseyside, today serving as the College Administrative centre.
- Industry: Pharmaceuticals
- Founded: 1859
- Defunct: 1989
- Fate: Merged with SmithKline Beckman
- Successor: SmithKline Beecham (later GlaxoSmithKline, now Haleon)
- Headquarters: London, United Kingdom
- Products: Phenethicillin, Methicillin
- Parent: GlaxoSmithKline

The Beecham Group plc was a British pharmaceutical company. It was once a constituent of the FTSE 100 Index. Founded by Thomas Beecham who opened the first factory in St Helens, Lancashire in 1859, Beecham focused on marketing the business by advertising in newspapers and using a network of wholesale agents in northern England and in London, rapidly building up the business. In August 1859 he created the slogan for Beecham's Pills: "Worth a guinea a box", considered to be the world's first advertising slogan, which helped the business become a global brand.

Beecham, after having merged with American pharmaceutical company SmithKline Beckman to become SmithKline Beecham, merged with Glaxo Wellcome to become GlaxoSmithKline (GSK). GSK (and later, Haleon) still uses the Beechams brand name in the UK for its over-the-counter cold and flu relief products.

== Early history ==
Beecham began as the family business of Thomas Beecham (1820–1907). (Beecham would become the grandfather of music conductor Thomas Beecham, 1879–1961). As a boy, Beecham worked as a shepherd, selling herbal remedies as a sideline.

He later became a travelling salesman or peddler full time. His first product was Beecham's Pills, a laxative, in 1842. Subsequent success enabled him to open a shop in Wigan in 1847. Beecham opened its first factory in 1859, in St Helens, Lancashire, for the rapid production of medicines. In August 1859, Beechams created a slogan for Beecham's Pills: "Beechams Pills: Worth a guinea a box", which is considered to be the world's first advertising slogan. First appearing in the St Helens Intelligencer, the Beechams adverts would appear in newspapers all over the world, helping the company become a global brand. The phrase was first said to be uttered by a satisfied lady purchaser from St Helens, the founder's home town. Under the founder's son, Sir Joseph Beecham, 1st Baronet (1848–1916), the business expanded, but remained a patent medicine company and engaged in little research.

== Expansion and diversification ==
In 1924, Philip Ernest Hill (1873–1944), who made his money in real estate, acquired control of Beecham's as Beecham Estates and Pills Ltd. Under his leadership, the company bought up other companies for their various products and for their marketing infrastructure, acquiring the Lucozade glucose drink and Macleans toothpaste in 1938, and, at the same time, introducing the Ribena blackcurrant drink. In 1938, it also bought the company selling Eno which had an extensive international presence. By purchasing the company manufacturing Brylcreem the following year, the company added hair products for men to its offerings.

In 1943, the company decided to focus more on improving research and built Beecham Research Laboratories at Brockham Park, Surrey. In 1945, the company was renamed Beecham Group Ltd. in 1953, Beecham acquired C.L. Bencard, which specialised in allergy vaccines.

Beecham Research Laboratories opened a four-acre site around October 1969 in Harlow in Essex, with 80 staff. In 1997 this became the SmithKline Beecham New Frontiers Science Park.

== Antibiotics ==
In 1959, Beecham scientists at Brockham Park announced that they had discovered the penicillin nucleus, 6-APA (6-aminopenicillanic acid); This discovery allowed Beecham, working in tandem with Bristol-Myers, to synthesize a number of new semisynthetic penicillins. Beecham marketed Broxil (phenethicillin), followed shortly by the more potent Celbenin (methicillin), which was active against Staphylococcus aureus. The group continued to focus on pharmaceutical development, producing further semi-synthetic penicillins. However, when Penbritin (ampicillin) came on the market in 1961, Beecham's facilities were soon inadequate for the worldwide demand for the drug. A 35-acre (140,000 m^{2}) complex at Worthing came on line in the early 1960s, to produce phenethicillin, followed by the ability to produce 6-APA, the base for semisynthetic penicillins.

The company continued to add products, and acquire other companies, through the 1970s and 1980s. In 1971, the S. E. Massengill Company was acquired. Beecham launched Amoxil (amoxicillin) in 1972, which went on to become one of the most widely prescribed antibiotics.

In 1973, Aquafresh toothpaste was launched, and in 1977, the Sucrets brand was acquired. Augmentin, an antibiotic used to treat an array of bacterial infections, was introduced in 1981. J.B. Williams Co., Inc. was acquired from Nabisco in 1982 for US$100 million (approximately £59 million), which included brands Aqua Velva, Geritol, and Sominex − the U.S. formulation − along with others.

== Later history ==
In 1986, the Beecham Group sold its numerous soft drink brands including Tango, Top Deck, Corona, and Quosh, as well as the UK franchises for Pepsi and 7 Up, to Britvic. The same year, Beecham acquired Norcliff Thayer from Revlon.

As the turn of the century approached, there were more significant mergers. In 1989, The Beecham Group plc and SmithKline Beckman merged to form SmithKline Beecham plc. In 2000, SmithKline Beecham and GlaxoWellcome merged to form GlaxoSmithKline.

A history of the company, Beechams, 1848–2000: From Pills to Pharmaceuticals, written by Thomas Anthony Buchanan Corley, was published in 2011.

== Products ==
=== Consumer healthcare ===
- Aquafresh
- Beecham's Pills
- Beecham's Powders
- Brylcreem
- Eno
- Horlicks
- Lucozade
- Ribena
- Vosene
- Macleans

=== Pharmaceuticals ===
- Amoxil (amoxicillin)
- Augmentin (co-amoxiclav)
- Avandia (rosiglitazone)
- Bactroban (mupirocin)
- Broxil (pheneticillin)
- Celbenin (meticillin)
- clavulanic acid
- Eminase (anistreplase)
- Engerix-B (hepatitis B vaccine)
- Floxapen (flucloxacillin)
- granisetron
- Havrix (hepatitis A vaccine)
- Orbenin (cloxacillin)
- Paxil (paroxetine)
- Penbritin (ampicillin)
- Pollinex (extract of ragweed pollen)
- Pyopen (carbenicillin)
- Relifex (nabumetone)
- Temopen (temocillin)
- Ticarpen (ticarcillin)
- Timentin (ticarcillin/clavulanate)

== See also ==
- Pharmaceutical industry in the United Kingdom
