= Audrey Beecham =

English poet, teacher and historian (1915–1989)

- by Tony Cowlishaw
- Born: Helen Audrey Beecham; 21 July 1915; Weaverham, Cheshire, England
- Died: 31 January 1989 (aged 73); Churchill Hospital, Oxford, England
- Occupations: Historian, writer

Helen Audrey Beecham (21 July 1915 – 31 January 1989) was an English poet, teacher and historian.

== Life ==
Beecham was born in Weaverham in 1915. Her grandfather was Sir Joseph Beecham, 1st Baronet, eldest son of Thomas Beecham, who had created a fortune with Beecham's Pills. Her uncle was the conductor Sir Thomas Beecham and her father devoted time to spending his inheritance. She took PPE at Somerville College in Oxford. She left with a second class degree and went to live in Paris in the group that included Henry Miller. She made a lasting friendship with the writers Lawrence Durrell and Anaïs Nin.

Beecham left Oxford and took a job at the University of Nottingham in 1950, lecturing in social and economic history. She was the first warden of the University's female hall of residence, Nightingale Hall. During her time in Nottingham she was an active member in a number of sporting clubs including the University's Rifle Club and Nottingham Rifle Association; letters in her archive show that she wrote to fellow colleague, explosives expert Colonel B.D. Shaw, to ask for advice on purchasing firearms. One anecdote tells of how when faced with demonstrating students intent on occupying one of the buildings she hid the weapons but supplied them with toilet paper. She memorably noted that revolutionaries frequently forgot the loo rolls.

Nottingham had one of the first Women's Liberation Groups. Audrey was the treasurer from 1971 until 1978. Her extensive archive from her time at the University is held by Manuscripts and Special Collections.

Sir Maurice Bowra, Warden of Wadham and Vice-Chancellor of Oxford was engaged to her. Bowra, a homosexual, explained his engagement by saying "buggers can't be choosers". In 1957, she published her first book of poetry, The Coast of Barbary.

== Death ==
Helen Audrey Beecham died in Churchill Hospital, Churchill Hospital, Oxford, England in 1989, aged 73, from asthma.
