= Just Jazz (BBC Radio Programme) =

Just Jazz is a BBC Radio specialist music programme based upon commercial recordings of jazz, broadcast between October 1957 and July 1961, and again between April 1969 and March 1970.

The gramophone-based, presenter-led programme Just Jazz became a regular feature of the BBC Light Programme’s Saturday early-evening schedule, first airing in October 1957 and continuing into the early 1960s. The programme was revived in April 1969 in a similar format as a Monday early-evening broadcast on the newly established BBC Radio 1, presented at different times by John Dunn, John Peel, Alexis Korner and others. Later that year and into 1970, Just Jazz was also heard in overnight "As Radio 1" relay segments on BBC Radio 2, with Radio Times listings showing the programme carried on both networks during shared late-night strands.

In many ways Just Jazz is the sister programme to Network Three’s Jazz Session, both produced from within the Gramophone Department by Jack Dabbs, and both starting their broadcasts in the same week. Initially, Just Jazz was presented by Charles Melville and Steve Race (who would both become irregular presenters of Jazz Session) and promoted in the Radio Times as “a programme of traditional, mainstream, and modern jazz on gramophone records”. From February 1958 the Radio Times shifts emphasis to the presenter, listing for alternative weeks “Charles Melville introduces JUST JAZZ” and “Steve Race introduces JUST JAZZ”. Dabbs adds Frank Dixon into the rotation in April 1959, agreeing to Dixon presenting the programme from the Manchester BBC studios to secure his participation, but joins Melville and Race in broadcasting from London in 1960. The 29th August and 5 September 1959 editions are broadcast live from the BBC’s ‘Gramstand’ at the National Radio Show at Earl's Court, the former just involving Melville, but the latter bring all three presenters together for one show. In December 1959, Steve Race presents Just Jazz with comedian Stanley Unwin in a Boxing Day edition, where Unwin plays the part of “Professor Stanley Unwin, Professor of Jazz Studies at Brewflade University”, presumably explaining jazz in his comic language, ‘Unwinese’.

By October 1960, the Radio Times listing indicates a more substantial shift in programming across the month, when each edition is titled by the form of jazz that can be heard, and the presenter taking a lower billing. Strangely, though, the first programme to be listed like this keeps the strapline declaring the range of jazz on offer. Dixon becomes responsible for the traditional jazz editions, Race the modern and Melville the mainstream. This is the format used to July 1961, when the first run comes to an end.

The revived programme was initially broadcast on Monday early evenings from April 1969, then moved to a slot after the midnight news in September, but its Radio Times strapline works on variations of “records of the best in jazz of today and yesterday” throughout. The Gramophone Department used three presenters over its 14-month run: John Dunn and John Frazer introduced broadly similar numbers of programmes at the head and tail of the series, with a two-month run helmed by Alexis Korner focusing on “traditional, swing, and modern jazz from films, going back to the 1920s … up to the present time”.
