= C17H20N2O5S =

The molecular formula C_{17}H_{20}N_{2}O_{5}S (molar mass: 364.41 g/mol, exact mass: 364.1093 u) may refer to:

- Bumetanide
- Pheneticillin
