= Madame Restell =

British-born American abortion provider and midwife

Ann Trow Lohman
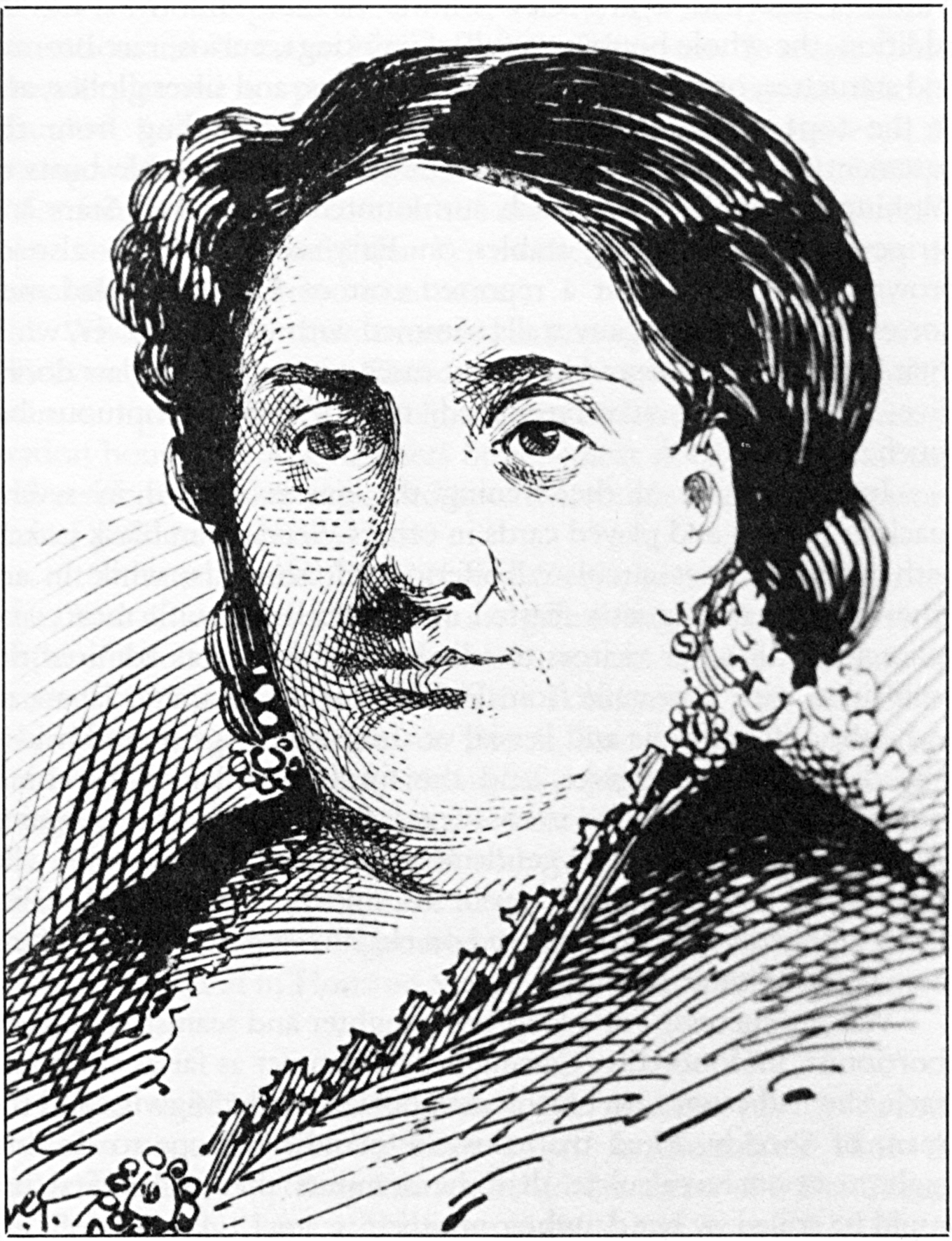
- Restell depicted in an 1888 illustration
- Born: Ann Trow; May 6, 1812; Painswick, Gloucestershire, England
- Died: April 1, 1878 (aged 65); Home on Fifth Avenue, Manhattan
- Cause of death: Suicide
- Resting place: Sleepy Hollow Cemetery
- Other name: Madame Restell
- Occupations: Purveyor of patent medicine, midwifery, and abortions
- Spouses: Henry Sommers (married 1828 or 1829–1833); Charles Lohman (married 1836–?)

Ann Trow Lohman (May 6, 1812 – April 1, 1878), better known as Madame Restell, was a British-born American abortion provider and midwife who practiced in New York City.

== Early life ==
Ann Trow was born in Painswick, Gloucestershire, England in 1812 to John and (Mary) Ann Trow (née Lewis). Her father was a labourer. At the age of 15, she started work as a maid in a butcher's family.

== Career ==
At the age of sixteen, she married Henry Sommers, an alcoholic tailor from Wiltshire. After three years living in England, they emigrated to New York in 1831 where Sommers died of typhoid in 1833. Ann Trow Sommers was left alone with an infant daughter, Caroline, and was forced to make a living as a seamstress and midwife.

Ann remarried in 1836, to a German–Russian immigrant, Charles Lohman. Charles Lohman worked in the printing industry, and at the time was a printer for the New York Herald. He was a radical and freethinker, a friend and colleague of George Matsell, the publisher of the radical journal the Free Inquirer. With Matsell, Charles was involved in the publication of Robert Dale Owen's book Moral Physiology; or, a Brief and Plain Treatise on the Population Question (1831) and Charles Knowlton's Fruits of Philosophy; or, The Private Companion of Young Married People (1831).

Ann's brother, Joseph Trow, had also emigrated to New York, and was working as a sales assistant in a pharmacy. Ann continued to develop an interest in women's health.

Charles and Ann developed a story to validate Ann's interests in midwifery and women's health. According to their story, she had travelled to Europe to train in midwifery with a renowned French physician named Restell. She began selling patent medicine, and (probably in partnership with her husband and brother) creating birth control products such as "preventative powders" and "Female Monthly Pills", advertised under the name "Madame Restell". She sold these products through the post and performed house visits. When these "Monthly Pills" proved insufficient for a woman to end a pregnancy and thus maintain good standing in society, Restell devised another solution. Self-professed doctors and pharmacists, she and her husband became surgeons. The new title ensured more profitable procedures could be performed under the same legal penalty given for offering medication-induced abortions.

Many domestic manuals at the time contained information on abortifacients, or agents, such as drugs, herbs, or other remedies that could terminate a pregnancy. While many of these texts described procedures for removing menstrual blockages and “restore menstrual flow if a period was missed,” other sections of the texts listed activities women should avoid if pregnant because they could induce an abortion, effectively instructing women on what they could attempt to terminate an unwanted pregnancy. Abortifacients used in this era were often blends of herbs such as ergot, calomel, aloe, or black hellebore. These were thought to upset the digestive tract, inducing a miscarriage. Surgical abortions included rupturing the amniotic sac, or dilating the cervix (premature labor), or even in-utero decapitation.

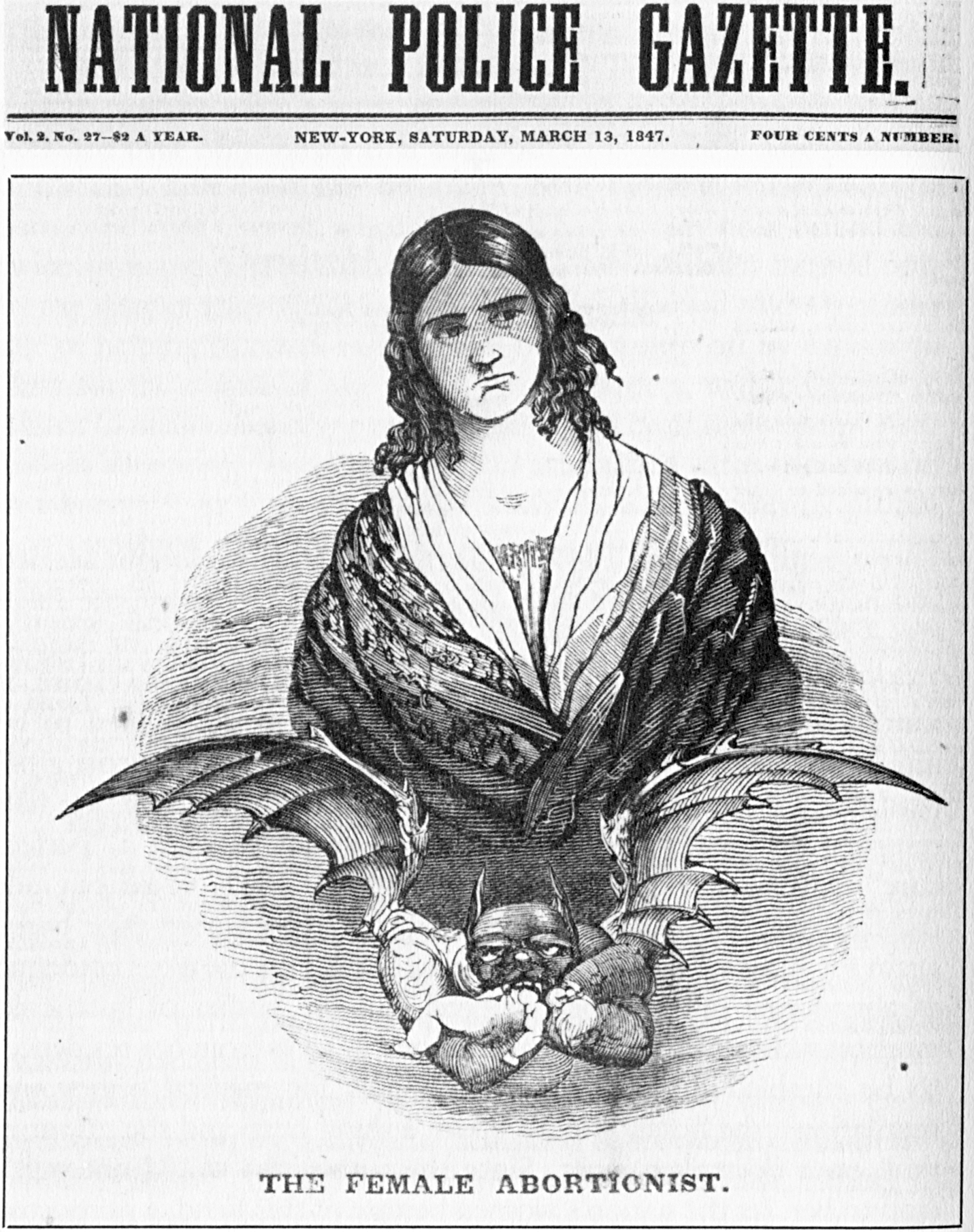
Penny press depiction of Madame Restell

Madame Restell advertised her services as a "Female Physician" in newspapers such as the Herald and even the New York Times. She and her husband Charles operated out of a large brownstone mansion on the northeast corner of Fifth Avenue and 52nd Street.

When Restell began her business, abortions were hardly illegal. Only surgical abortions were forbidden, and this was only after the quickening, that is, when the woman started to feel the fetus move (this was typically around 4 months time). As a result, historians and other researchers have suggested that it is essentially impossible ever to know the exact incidence of nineteenth-century abortions since many women likely performed them at home or sought medical help under the guise of removing a perceived menstrual blockage. Once pregnancy was known, however, women could no longer use the argument of relieving a blocked menses as an explanation for taking abortifacients.

Soon, Restell's success began to attract copiers and competition. This drew the attention of the AMA, which officially launched a campaign in 1857 to end abortion. In order to rally support for their cause, the AMA targeted Restell, the most celebrated abortion provider and deemed her the enemy. The term "Restellism" became a euphemism for abortion. With the swift changes of law in New York, Restell was constantly being hounded by authorities and anti-abortion crusaders to end her practice.

She was met with opposition from the press. Enoch E. Camp and George Wilkes' National Police Gazette covered New York's "crime news" and detailed stories about theft, abortion, and rape. Coverage was not limited to New York but rather extended to major cities throughout the United States and Europe. The Gazette claimed that in addition to performing abortions, "...most of the abandoned infants found almost daily throughout the city came from her [Restell's] establishment."

Conservative editors such as Samuel Jenks Smith of the New York Sunday Morning News also publicly condemned Restell's profession. On July 7, 1839—the earliest press's attack on Restell—his editorial claimed her business "...strikes at the root of all social order." According to Smith, doctors believed Restell was engaging in dangerous work, and that "...what she was doing was impossible without endangering the lives of the patients." Her work was considered "sinful".

Madame Restell became so well known throughout New York City that copies of her trials were published in the Times and the Police Gazette. She was listed as a New York City attraction in tour guides.

Madame Restell became one of the most widely known abortionists in nineteenth-century America, with her activities frequently reported in newspapers across the United States. Her prominence was due in part to her extensive use of discreet newspaper advertisements, which promoted her services while maintaining a degree of anonymity.

In addition to providing services, she sold abortifacient patent medicines containing ingredients such as pennyroyal, savin, tansy, and ergot of rye, substances that had been used for centuries in attempts to induce abortion. Her notoriety was amplified by sensationalized media coverage, which contributed to both her public recognition and controversy

Some historians have interpreted Restell's public statements as reflecting early arguments for women's bodily autonomy. In her advertising and writings, she framed her services in terms of women's health and familial responsibilities, asking "Are we not bound... to preserve, to guard, to protect our health... that we may rear and watch over those to whom we are allied by ties of the most sacred and binding?"

At the same time, critics portrayed Restell and other women associated with reproductive services as violating contemporary gender norms, with some claiming such figured had "forfeited" their womanhood by challenging traditional roles.

== Legal troubles ==
In 1840, a patient named Maria Purdy accused Restell of causing tuberculosis through the abortion procedure. The press erupted with anger against Restell, calling her "the monster in human shape" and charging her with acts against God. Restell promised monetary compensation to anyone who could prove that her methods were dangerous, and while she was initially found guilty, her appeal overturned said verdict. Her uneasy relationship with public opinion continued.

Mary Applegate was an unmarried woman, a mistress, who had been sent to Madame Restell from Philadelphia by her illicit lover. The father had arranged for Restell to adopt the baby for other people. Applegate was unaware of this deal until she had returned to Philadelphia and was greeted coldly by her former lover. Applegate then went back to Restell to ask for her child back, but Restell claimed to know nothing of the infant. Restell immediately was painted as the villain by the press in publications such as the New York Medical and Surgical Reporter.

In 1841, Mary Rogers was found dead in the Hudson River. Newspapers suggested that she had died during an abortion carried out by Restell. Her case was made more famous due to the short story by Edgar Allan Poe, "The Mystery of Marie Rogêt".

Abortion was soon outlawed by the state of New York in 1845. This law further restricted the previous laws from a decade earlier. An abortion that resulted in the death of the mother or was performed after the "quickening" was second degree manslaughter. A new addendum to the law made selling abortifacients or performing abortions at any stage during the pregnancy a misdemeanor punishable by a mandatory year in jail. Additionally, women who sought after an abortion or attempted their own abortion were fined $1,000 (equivalent to $34,554 in 2025). Abortion legally became defined as an obscene subject and was no longer covered in the papers. Women were no longer allowed to freely discuss abortion. Restell skirted the legalities by advertising her services as methods to regulate menses.

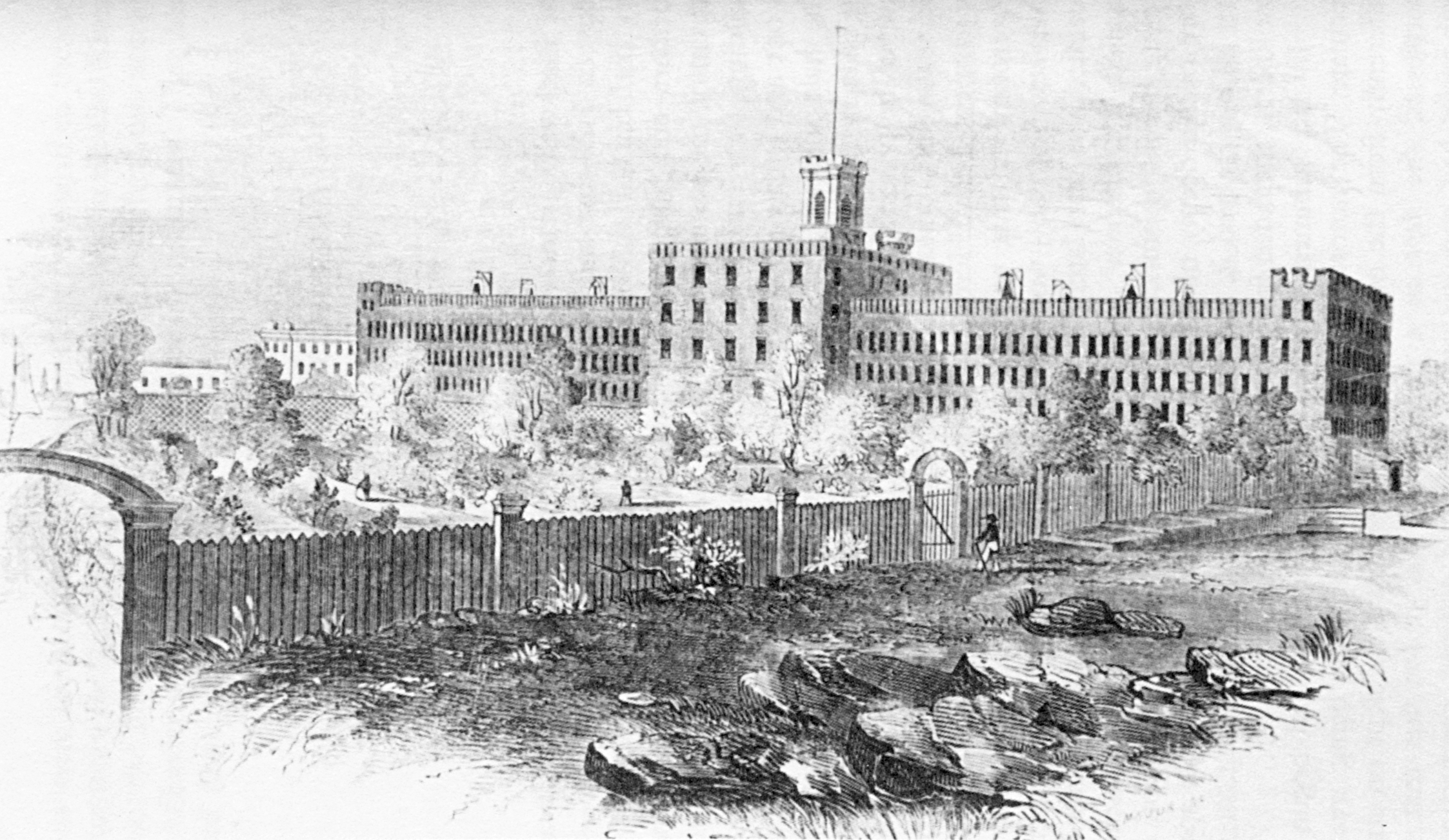
Blackwell's Island Prison

In 1847, Charges were again brought against Restell for performing an abortion, which led to a conviction. This conviction, however, was "universally hailed," and media coverage of the trial prompted discussion surrounding for-profit abortions performed by physicians. Furthermore, it was noted that the victims were typically "poor, uneducated women" from New England and Connecticut who came to New York for abortions.

Maria Bodine was sent to Madame Restell by her master so that she could procure an abortion from Restell. Restell determined that Maria was too far along to have an abortion, but Maria's master insisted. Finally, he paid Restell heavily, and she agreed to perform Maria's abortion. Maria then returned to her job as a maid. She fell ill and upon visiting a doctor, was forced to admit her abortion. Restell was taken to trial. During this case, Madame Restell's defense painted Bodine as a "loose" woman whose injuries were a result of syphilis and had nothing to do with Restell, and Maria Bodine's lawyers cast Restell as a godless incompetent woman. This was in spite of Bodine testifying that far from being mistreated by Restell, she was well cared for and provided with food and a place to rest until she felt well enough to return home following her procedure. Restell lost the case and was charged with a misdemeanor and a one-year prison sentence which was on Blackwell's Island.

After Madame Restell finished her sentence, she reworked her business. She removed surgical abortions entirely, and concentrated her efforts on pills and her boarding house. In 1854, Restell applied for U.S. citizenship and was granted it. Evidence given in a breach-of-promise case in 1854 suggests Restell and her husband were charging between $50 (equivalent to $1,792 in 2025) and $100 (equivalent to $3,583 in 2025) per abortion at this time and had a regular clientele. Before the 1845 law, Restell was charging her clients on a sliding scale according to social class. Many of Restell's wealthier patients were charged upwards of $1,000 (equivalent to $35,833 in 2025). While Madame Restell reduced her business, the press did not leave her reputation to rest. She was dubbed "The Wickedest Woman in New York".

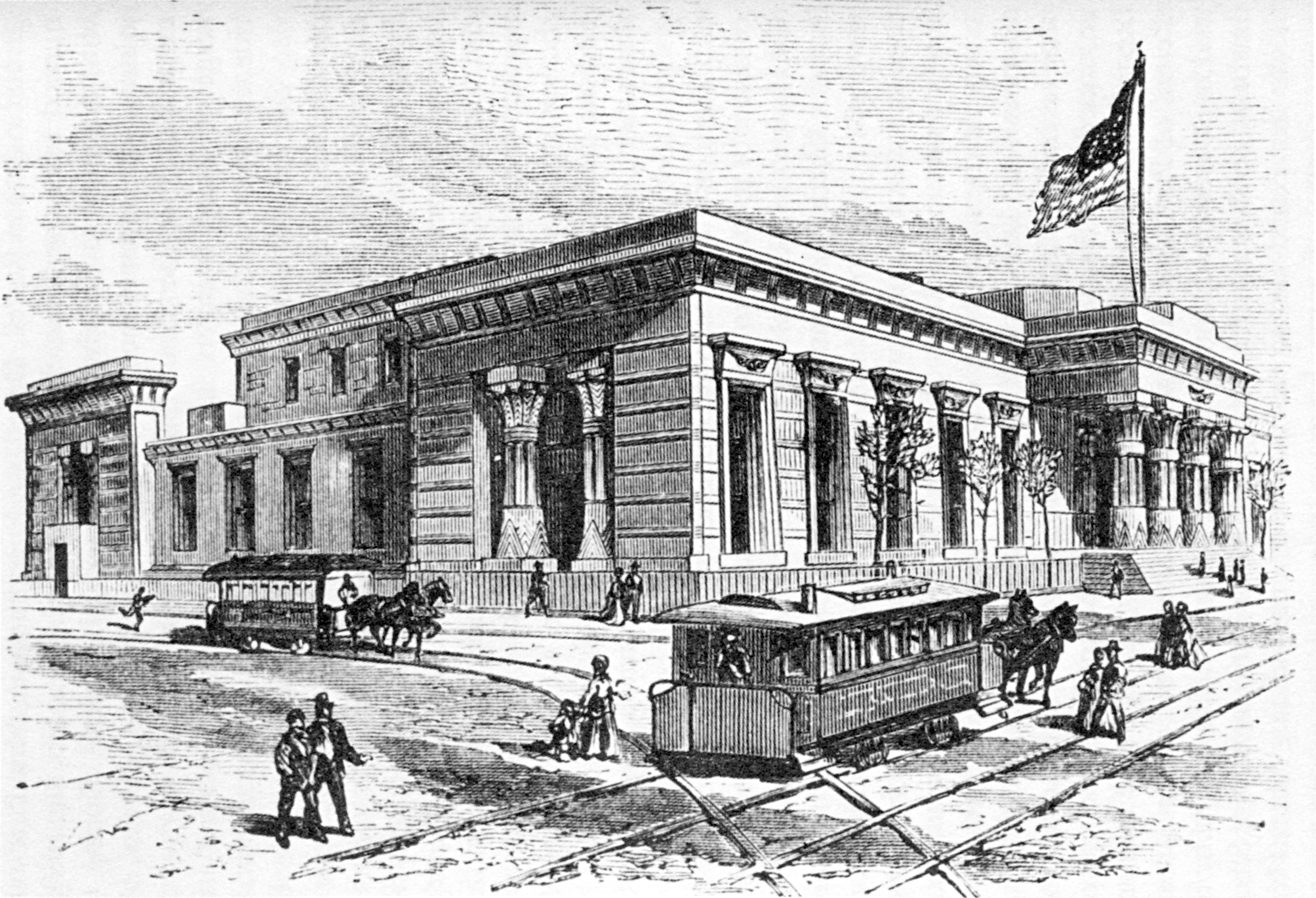
New York Halls of Justice

In 1855, Frederica Medinger, a German immigrant, approached Restell asking for a room to stay in until the birth of her child. According to Medinger, Restell gave her six pills at the time of the birth. A day after the birth, Medinger asked for her child and was told by Restell that the child had disappeared. Restell was accused of kidnapping and being too greedy. When Restell was taken to court, Medinger did not show. Many assumed Restell had paid her to drop the case. Restell was dismissed, and the woman and her baby were never heard of again. It is assumed the child was adopted through an arrangement by Restell.

The various reactions to Restell and her New York practice echoed general attitudes toward abortion in the United States. Traveling salesmen in cities such as Boston and Philadelphia heard of her financial success and sold pills to capitalize on similar profits. Before her own legal troubles, Restell heard stories of abortion providers in Philadelphia and Lowell, Massachusetts indicted for murder—indicators of growing opposition to the practice on a national scale. A similar case was that of Dr. John Stevens, a physician who performed an abortion on a young Boston woman named Gallagher. Her death, a consequence of this high-risk operation, prompted Stevens to be accused of murder.

Though the Civil War distracted many Americans from the abortion debate, its end allowed some physicians to return to their anti-abortion campaign.

"Since the embryo, they argued, was fully alive from the point of conception, abortion at any point, regardless of whether the mother had quickened or not—was murder pure and simple."

While some physician took clear moral stances on the issue, others found their campaign increased the likelihood that untrained physicians would be penalized, thereby creating the potential to advance the activists' own professional goals.

Madame Restell had amassed a fortune. She owned several plots of land, one of which featured an extravagant mansion. She had the finest horses, carriages, and silk dresses. The Civil War gave Restell the cover she needed to get her business back on her feet. Although she had been imprisoned once and accused numerous times, Restell appeared unscathed.

Restell's practice generated significant public controversy, and she was frequently the subject of criticism reflecting broader social anxieties about gender roles and reproductive control. Despite this scrutiny, contemporaries noted that she maintained a composed public demeanor.

She faced multiple legal challenges during her career. Some accounts suggest that she attempted to avoid prosecution through bribery, although she continued to advertise her services extensively. Her prosecutions occurred during a period when legal enforcement against abortion providers was becoming more common; prior to this shift, such practitioners were rarely arrested or charged.

== Arrest by Comstock ==
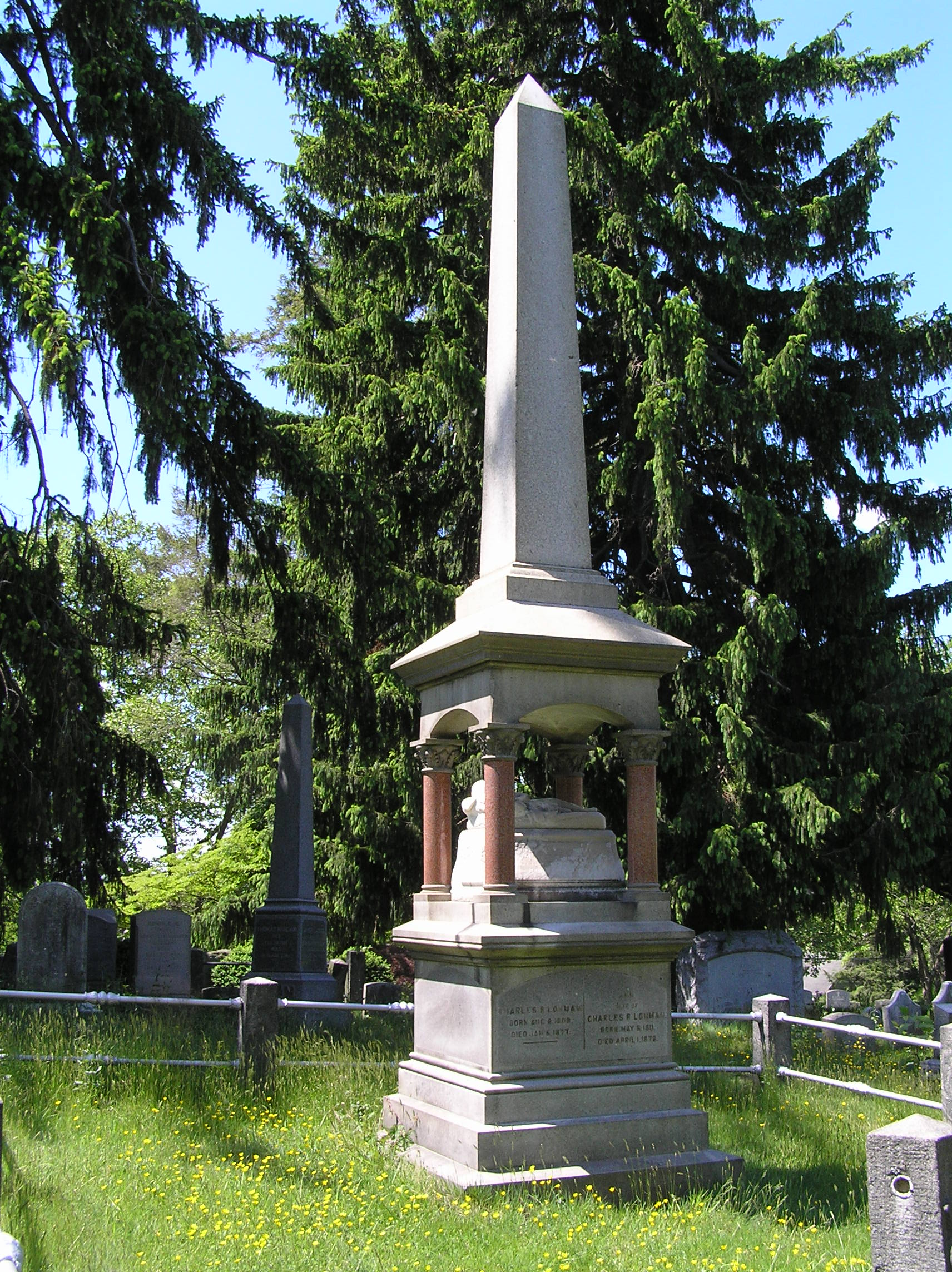
Burial site in Sleepy Hollow Cemetery

Postal Inspector Anthony Comstock was an influential moral reformer, who sought not only to regulate sexual activity, but the very way society thought about sex. He considered any information about the prevention or termination of a pregnancy to be pornographic. In 1873, the U.S. Congress enacted the Comstock laws, which made it illegal to discuss or distribute anything considered obscene by the government. Breaking these laws was punishable by six months to five years in prison and a fine from $100 (equivalent to $2,688 in 2025) to $2000 (equivalent to $53,750 in 2025). Madame Restell was arrested by Comstock, who posed as a customer looking for birth control pills for his wife and took the police around the next day to have her arrested. In a raid on her home, "he found printed materials that provided birth control information as well as mysterious 'instruments' with instructions for use."

Bail was set at $1,000 (equivalent to $33,362 in 2025). She was said to have reached into her purse to pull out $10,000, but the judge would accept only regular bail bonds, so Restell had to pay a bondsman. Following Restell's arrest in early 1878, a maid discovered her in the bathtub at her home on Fifth Avenue; she had slit her own throat on the morning of April 1, 1878. Upon her death, she was found to be worth between $500,000 (equivalent to $16,681,034 in 2025) and $600,000 (equivalent to $20,017,241 in 2025).

== Literature ==
- Madame Restell is a prominent character in Marge Piercy's historical novel Sex Wars, which depicts the social and political climate surrounding women's sexual, physical, and reproductive activities during the Gilded Age.
- Restell features as a minor character in Gore Vidal's novel 1876.
- Restell is featured in Edward Rutherfurd's novel New York.

== See also ==
- Abortion
- History of abortion
- Patent medicine
