= Vosene =

Brand of medicated shampoo

- Product type: Shampoo
- Current owner: Lornamead
- Country: United Kingdom
- Introduced: 1949
- Previous owners: Procter & Gamble
- Website: vosene.co.uk

Vosene is a brand of medicated shampoo, intended to provide relief from dandruff. It is widely available in the United Kingdom in 300 or 500 ml bottles.

== Brand background ==
Vosene was established in 1949, becoming famous for its medicated formula and remedying dandruff. It was used by generations of British families, but lost favour in the 1980s.

Vosene shampoo is available in four varieties: Original Medicated, Frequent Anti-Dandruff, 2 in 1 Gentle Action and Activating Shampoo.

The Original formula contains salicylic acid, an anti-dandruff ingredient. However, this was not the active ingredient prior to the late 1980s. Before the change to salicylic acid, the two active ingredients in Vosene were coal tar and sulphusuccinated undecylenic monoalkanolamide. These chemicals were discovered to be carcinogenic, leading to their replacement with salicylic acid; therefore, what's now marketed as "original formula" Is not the same product. Frequent Anti-Dandruff is formulated for daily use. 2 in 1 Gentle Action contains a conditioner Activating Shampoo for thinning hair. The Activating Shampoo has a counterpart Activating Tonic, designed to be used in conjunction with the Activating Shampoo as a hair thinning treatment.

A range for children is marketed under the Vosene Kids brand and was introduced in 2008. In this range are Extra Shine Detangler Spray, Advanced Conditioning Defence Spray, Conditioning Shampoo, Conditioning Shampoo and Mega Hold Styling Gel.

== Acquisition ==
The Vosene products are now marketed by Lornamead, a privately held global marketer of personal care brands. Lornamead acquired the Vosene brand from Procter & Gamble as part of a deal involving taking six Wella brands.
