= Advertising slogan =

Short phrases used in advertising campaigns

"Think Different", an Apple slogan introduced in 1997

Advertising slogans are short phrases used in advertising campaigns to generate publicity and unify a company's marketing strategy. The phrases may be used to attract attention to a distinctive product feature or reinforce a company's brand.

== Etymology and nomenclature ==
According to the 1913 Webster's Dictionary, a slogan derives from the Scottish Gaelic "sluagh-ghairm", a battle cry. Its contemporary definition denotes a distinctive advertising motto or advertising phrase used by any entity to convey a purpose or ideal. This is also known as a catchphrase. Taglines, or tags, are American terms describing brief public communications to promote certain products and services. In the UK, they are called end lines or straplines. In Japan, advertising slogans are called catch copy (キャッチコピー, kyatchi kopī) or catchphrase (キャッチフレーズ, kyatchi furēzu).

== Format ==
Most corporate advertisements are short, memorable phrases, often between three and five words. Slogans adopt different tones to convey different meanings. For example, funny slogans can enliven conversation and increase memorability. Slogans often unify diverse corporate advertising pieces across different mediums. Slogans may be accompanied by logos, brand names, or musical jingles.

== History ==
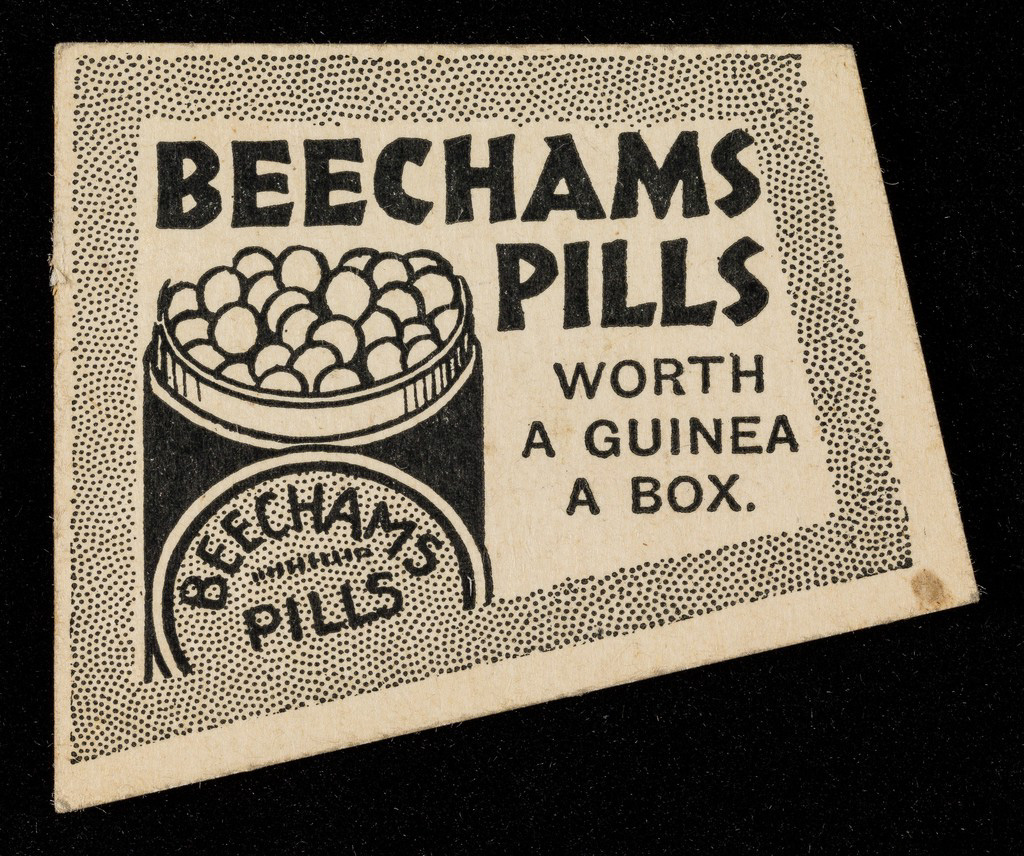
"Beechams Pills: Worth a guinea a box" slogan from August 1859

In August 1859, Thomas Beecham, founder of the British firm Beechams, created a slogan for Beecham's Pills: "Beechams Pills: Worth a guinea a box", which is considered to be the world's first advertising slogan, helping the company become a global brand. The phrase, which first appeared in a Beechams advertisement in the St Helens Intelligencer, was first said to be uttered by a satisfied lady purchaser from St Helens, Lancashire, the founder's home town.

== Use ==
Some slogans are created for long term corporate identity processes, while others are interested in specific limited-time campaigns. However, since some ideas resonate with the public with persistence, many advertising slogans retain their influence even after general use is discontinued. If an advertising slogan enters into the public vernacular, word-of-mouth communication may increase consumer awareness of the product and extend an ad campaign's lifespan, or cause a company to adopt it for long term advertising and identity.

Slogans that associate emotional responses or evoke recollections of memories increase their likelihood of being adopted by the public and shared. Additionally, by linking a slogan to a commonplace discussion topic (e.g. stress, food, traffic), consumers will recall the slogan more often and associate the corporation with their personal experiences.

If a slogan is adopted by the public, it can have a notable influence on everyday social interaction. Slogans can serve as connection points between community members as individuals share pithy taglines in conversation. In contrast, if an individual is unaware of a popular slogan or tagline, they can be socially excluded from conversation and disengage from the discussion.

=== Social control ===
Advertising slogans as a system of social control include devices similar to watchwords, catchwords, and mottoes. The use of slogans may be examined insofar as the slogans elicit unconscious and unintentional responses.

== The ongoing argument ==
Quantifying the effects of an effective, or ineffective, ad campaign can prove challenging to scholars. Critics argue taglines are a self-gratifying, unnecessary form of corporate branding that is neither memorable nor pithy. However, proponents argue if taglines enter everyday public discourse, the company's market influence could exponentially increase.

== Functional slogans ==
A marketing slogan can play a part in the interplay between rival companies. A functional slogan usually:

- states product benefits (or brand benefits) for users (or potential buyers)
- implies a distinction between it and other firms' products—with constraints
- makes a simple, concise, (Note: Including all important information.) clearly defined, and appropriate statement
- is either witty, or has a distinct "personality" (Note: Or, an externally evident aspect.)
- gives a credible impression of a brand or product (Note: See also: Brand recognition.)
- makes the consumer experience an emotion; or, creates a need or desire (Note: See also: Aspirational brand.)
- is hard to forget—it adheres to one's memory (Note: Whether one likes it or not; especially if accompanied by mnemonic devices (such as jingles, ditties, pictures or film).)

The business sloganeering process communicates the value of a product or service to customers, to sell the product or service. It is a business function for attracting customers.

== See also ==
- Advertising (Consumerism)
- Consumer confusion
- Impulse buying (Impulse)
- List of slogans
- Media manipulation
- Political slogan
- Promotion (marketing)
- Tagline
- Visual marketing

== External articles ==
- Quotations related to Advertising slogan at Wikiquote
- The Advertising Slogan Hall of Fame, www.adslogans.co.uk
- Advertising Industry Guidelines 2014
- Advertising Slogans
