= Henry Katz =

Henry Katz (born 1892, date of death unknown) was a medical doctor who was sentenced to prison at Sing Sing in June 1943. He was given a sentence of one to four years for performing an abortion on Harriet Lichtenberg of Brooklyn, New York. Lichtenberg, 23, died on October 18, 1942, at Royal Hospital, the Bronx, following the medical procedure to terminate her pregnancy. Katz pleaded guilty to first degree manslaughter in the Bronx County, New York court on June 4, 1943. In court Judge James M. Barrett admitted that Katz's case was one of the most difficult to come before him.

Katz was a United States Army veteran of World War I. His son was serving in the army at the time he was sentenced. Katz resided at 1005 Jerome Avenue, the Bronx. He was indicted by a Bronx County grand jury on October 27, 1942.

Lichtenberg's home was at 1379 St. John's Place, Brooklyn.
