= Thomas Beecham (chemist) =

British businessman and chemist (1820–1907)

- Born: 3 December 1820; Curbridge, Oxfordshire, England, United Kingdom
- Died: 6 April 1907 (aged 86); Southport, England, United Kingdom
- Occupation(s): Pharmacist, company founder
- Known for: Beechams Pharmaceutic company
- Family: Sir Joseph Beecham, 1st Baronet (son), Sir Thomas Beecham (grandson)

Thomas Beecham (3 December 1820 – 6 April 1907) was a British businessman who founded Beechams, a large pharmaceutical business. In 1859, he focused on marketing the business by advertising in newspapers and using a network of wholesale agents in northern England and in London, rapidly building up the business. In August 1859, he created the slogan for Beecham's Pills: "Worth a guinea a box", which is considered to be the world's first advertising slogan, helping the company become a global brand.

== Career ==
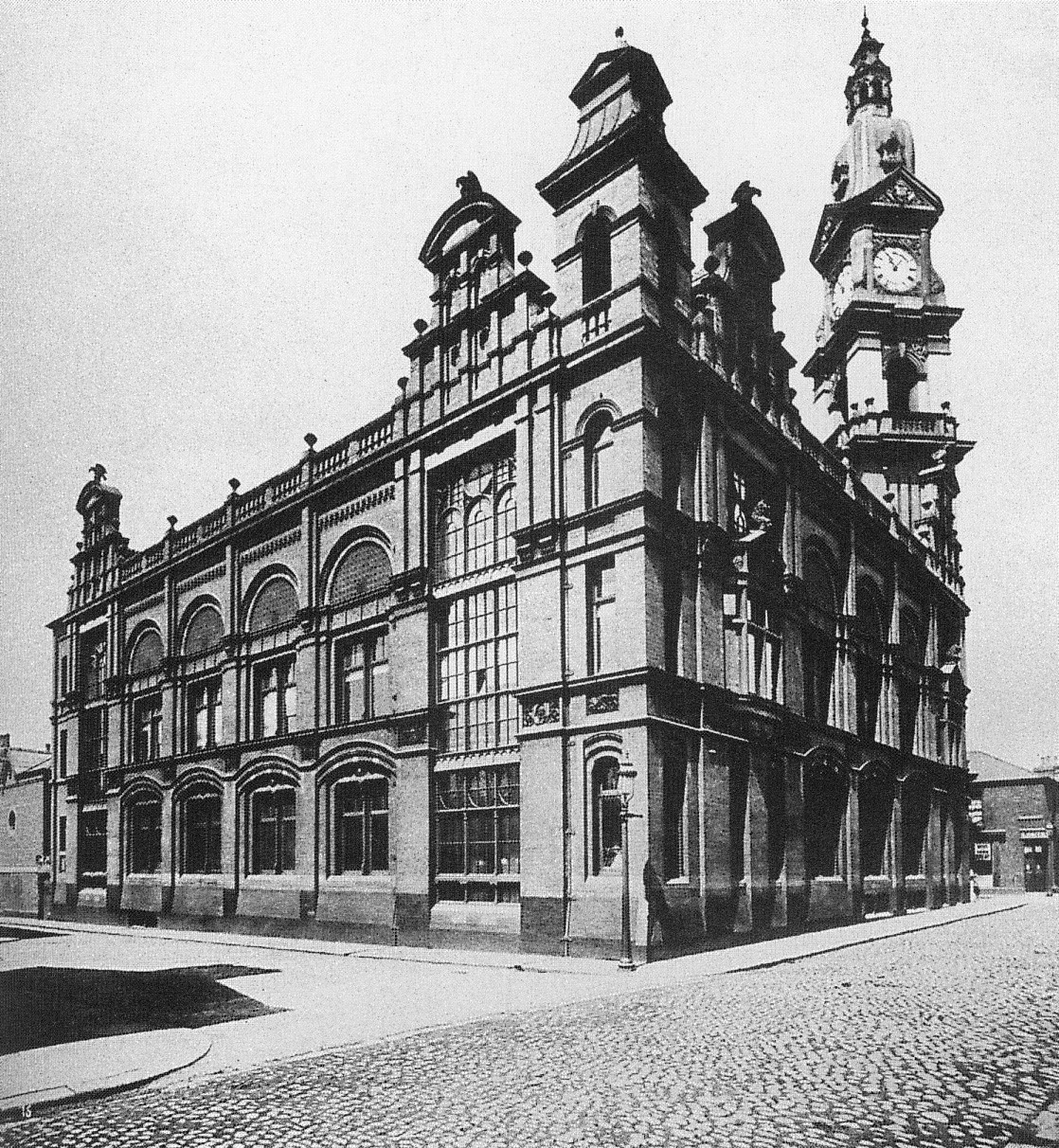
Beecham's Clock Tower built in 1877 in St Helens, Merseyside, today serving as the College Administrative centre.

Born in Curbridge in Oxfordshire, Beecham became a shepherd's boy at the age of 8 and it is in this role that he learnt about herbal medicine.

For a while he worked as the village postman in Kidlington but in 1847 he moved to Wigan, where he started selling Beecham's Pills which were a laxative. By 1859 he was based in St Helens where he started advertising as well as selling his pills. On 6 August 1859, "Beechams Pills: Worth a guinea a box", considered to be the world's first advertising slogan, appeared in a Beechams advertisement in the St Helens Intelligencer. The phrase was first said to be uttered by a satisfied lady purchaser from St Helens, Lancashire, the founder's home town. He created a network of agents throughout Lancashire and Yorkshire and by 1880 he had expanded his business so much that he was able to open his first factory.

In 1893 he moved to Southport, where he fully retired within three years. He died in Southport in 1907 and is buried in St Helens. He left £86,680 in his will. In their 1907 obituary of Beecham, the Daily Mirror said the slogan "Worth a guinea a box" was the making of the business and the foundation of a huge fortune.

== Family ==
In 1847, he married Jane Evans and together they went on to have two sons and two daughters. He subsequently married Sarah Pemberton in 1873 and Mary Sawell in 1879. His elder son was Sir Joseph Beecham, 1st Baronet, and his grandson was the noted conductor Sir Thomas Beecham. His younger son was William Eardley Beecham. A great grandchild was the poet Audrey Beecham.
