= Pheneticillin =

Chemical compound

Clinical data
- AHFS/Drugs.com: International Drug Names
- ATC code: J01CE05 (WHO)

Identifiers
- IUPAC name: (2S,5R,6R)-3,3-dimethyl-7-oxo-6-[(2-phenoxypropanoyl)amino]-4-thia-1-azabicyclo[3.2.0]heptane-2-carboxylic acid
- CAS Number: 147-55-7
- PubChem CID: 272833
- ChemSpider: 240055
- UNII: EFA30X554H
- KEGG: D08350
- ChEMBL: ChEMBL1614637
- CompTox Dashboard (EPA): DTXSID6023448
- ECHA InfoCard: 100.005.175

Chemical and physical data
- Formula: C_{17}H_{20}N_{2}O_{5}S
- Molar mass: 364.42 g·mol^{−1}
- 3D model (JSmol): Interactive image
- SMILES: CC(C(=O)N[C@H]1[C@@H]2N(C1=O)[C@H](C(S2)(C)C)C(=O)O)OC3=CC=CC=C3
- InChI: InChI=1S/C17H20N2O5S/c1-9(24-10-7-5-4-6-8-10)13(20)18-11-14(21)19-12(16(22)23)17(2,3)25-15(11)19/h4-9,11-12,15H,1-3H3,(H,18,20)(H,22,23)/t9?,11-,12+,15-/m1/s1; Key:NONJJLVGHLVQQM-JHXYUMNGSA-N

Pheneticillin (or phenethicillin) is a penicillin. It is not approved by the FDA for use in the United States.
