= Beecham's Pills =

Laxative

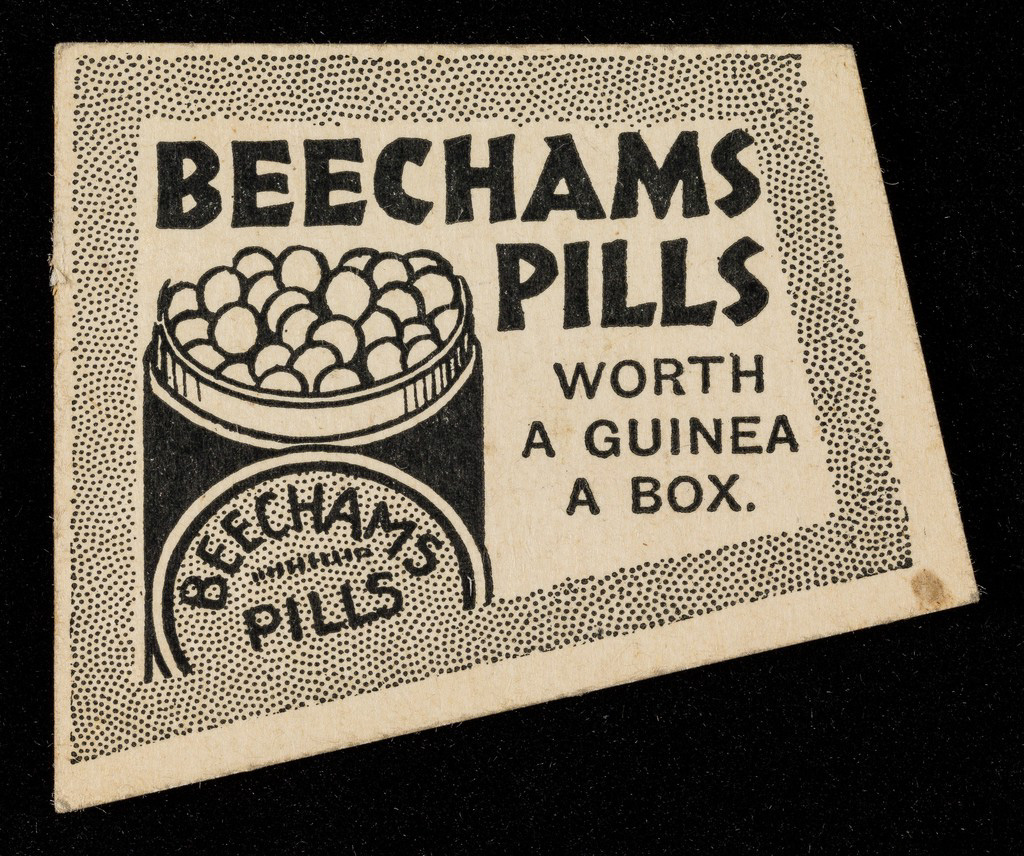
"Beechams Pills: Worth a guinea a box" slogan from August 1859

Beecham's Pills were a laxative first marketed about 1842 in Wigan, Lancashire. They were invented by Thomas Beecham (1820–1907), grandfather of the conductor Sir Thomas Beecham (1879–1961). The British pharmaceutical firm, established in 1859 as Beechams, became a global brand, and in the year it was founded produced the first advertising slogan: "Worth a guinea a box."

== Commercial history ==
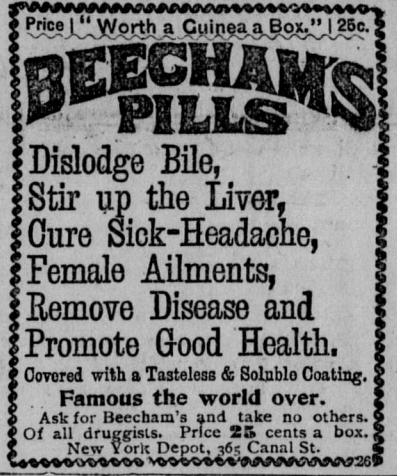
Advertisement in the Los Angeles Herald, July 20, 1893

The pills themselves were a combination of aloe, ginger, and soap. They were initially advertised like other patent medicine as a cure-all, but they actually did benefit the digestive process. This effectiveness made them stand out from other remedies for sale in the mid-19th century.

The pills, and their marketing, were the basis for Beecham's Patent Pills, which became Beecham Estates and Pills in 1924, eight years after the death of Sir Joseph Beecham, the son of Thomas Beecham. The pills continued to be made by a succession of companies: Beecham Pills Limited, Beecham Pharmaceuticals Limited, Beecham Health Care, and SmithKline Beecham. The manufacture of the pills was discontinued in 1998.

== Popularity ==
"The first advertising slogan broke new ground when it was published, helping a British firm become a successful global brand in an era when that was no mean feat — and inspiring others to follow suit."

— The Herald on Beecham's.

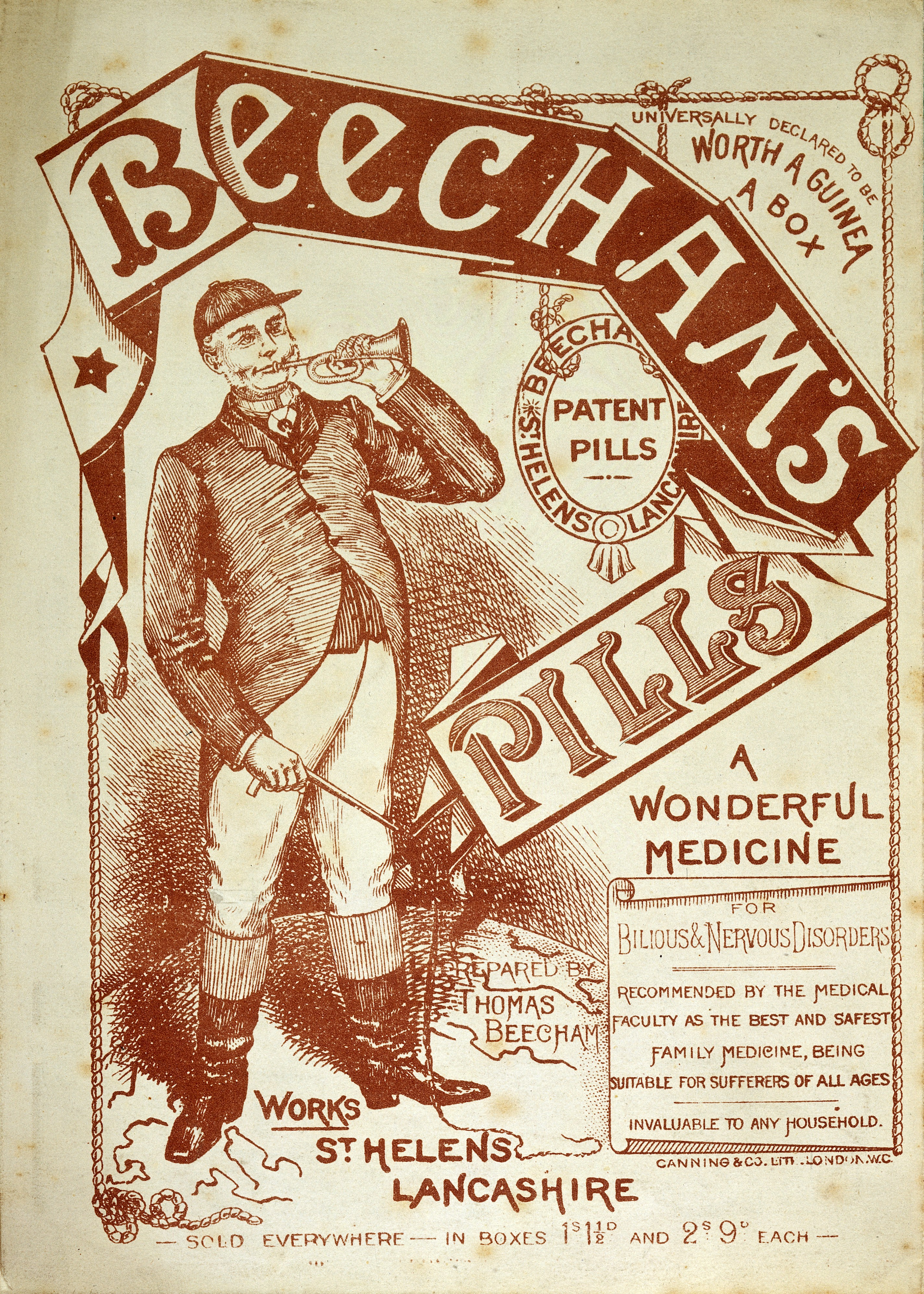
Advertisement c. 1900

In 1859, Thomas Beecham focused on marketing Beechams by advertising in British newspapers. Two slogans used in Beecham's advertising were "Worth a guinea a box" (the world's first advertising slogan which first appeared in a Beechams advertisement in the St Helens Intelligencer in August 1859), and "Beecham's pills make all the difference". The first phrase was said to be uttered by a satisfied lady purchaser from St Helens, Lancashire, the founder's home town. Beechams adverts would later appear in newspapers all over the world, helping the company become a global brand.

The popularity of the pills produced a wide range of testimonials that were used in advertising. The poet William Topaz McGonagall wrote a poem advertising the pills, giving his recommendation in verse. In their 1907 obituary of Beecham, the Daily Mirror said the slogan "Worth a guinea a box" was the making of the business and the foundation of a huge fortune.

In early 20th century Cockney rhyming slang, beechams may refer to the signs held by beggars (bills) or testicles.

== See also ==
- Beecham (pharmaceutical company)
- Pharmaceutical industry in the United Kingdom
