= Joseph Beacham (disambiguation) =

Joseph Beacham (1874–1958) was an American football player.

Joseph Beacham or Joseph Beecham may also refer to:

- Joseph R. Beacham, American music publisher
- Joseph Beecham (1848–1916), British businessman and baronet
- Joe Beecham, Ghanaian singer

== See also ==
- Beacham (surname)
