= List of songs written by Stephen Foster =

This is a list of songs written by Stephen Foster (1826–1864) including those published posthumously. Foster may have written words and/or music for each song.

Several of Foster's songs have alternate titles which are included in the "Title" column along with the original title. The original title is always given first.

== Table ==
Sortable table
Title	Published	Publisher	Lyricist	Genre
"Ah! May the Red Rose Live Alway"	1850	F. D. Benteen		
"All Day Long"	1864 (April)	Holloway's Musical Monthly Magazine	Clara Morton	
"Anadolia"	1854	Firth, Pond & Co.		
"Angelina Baker" or "Angelina the Baker"	1850	F. D. Benteen		
"The Angels Are Singing Unto Me"	1863	Horace Waters		
"Annie My Own Love"	1853	Firth, Pond & Co.	Charles P. Shiras	
"The Anthenaeum Collection"	1863	Horace Waters		
"Away Down South" or "Way Down Souf"	1848	W. C. Peters & Co.		
"Beautiful Child of Song"	1860	Clark's School Visitor Magazine		
"Beautiful Dreamer"	1864	Wm. A. Pond & Co.	Published posthumously	
"The Beautiful Shore"	1863	Horace Waters	Mrs. O. S. Matteson	
"Better Times Are Coming" or "Better Days Are Coming"	1862	Horace Waters		
"The Bright Hills of Glory"	1863	Horace Waters	Mary Ann Kidder	
"Bring My Brother Back to Me"	1863	S. T. Gordon	George Cooper	
"Bury Me in the Morning, Mother"	1863	Horace Waters		
"Camptown Races" or "Gwine to Run All Night"	1850	F. D. Benteen		
"Cane Brake Jig" or "Plantation Jig"	1853	Firth, Pond & Co.		
"Choral Harp"	1863	Horace Waters		
"Come Where My Love Lies Dreaming"	1855	Firth, Pond & Co.		
"Come With Thy Sweet Voice Again"	1854	Firth, Pond & Co.		
"Comrades, Fill No Glass for Me"	1855	Miller & Beacham		
"Cora Dean"	1860	Firth, Pond & Co.		
"Dearer Than Life!"	1869 (February or March)	The Demorest Monthly Magazine	George Cooper	
"Dolcy Jones"	1849	Firth, Pond & Co.		
"Dolly Day"	1850	F. D. Benteen		
"Don't Be Idle"	1863	Horace Waters	Mary Ann Kidder	
"Don't Bet Your Money On de Shanghai"	1861	Firth, Pond & Co.		
"Down Among the Cane Brakes"	1860	Firth, Pond & Co.		
"A Dream of My Mother and My Home" or "I Dream of My Mother" or "A Dream of My Mother Land"	1862	Horace Waters		
"Ellen Bayne"	1854	Firth, Pond & Co.		
"Eulalie"	1851	Firth, Pond & Co.	Henry Sylvester Cornwall	
"Fairy Belle"	1859	Firth, Pond & Co.		
"Farewell Mother Dear"	1861	John J. Daly		
"Farewell My Lilly Dear"	1851	Firth, Pond & Co.		
"Farewell Old Cottage"	1851	Firth, Pond & Co.		
"Farewell Sweet Mother"	1861	Firth, Pond & Co.		
"Fighting for the Flag Day and Night"	1865	Horace Waters		
"For the Dear Old Flag, I Die"	1863	Horace Waters	George Cooper	
"For Thee Love for Thee"	1859	Firth, Pond & Co.	William Henry McCarthy	
"Friendship with the World"			Joseph C. Ludgate	hymn
"Gentle Annie"	1856	Firth, Pond & Co.		
"Gentle Lena Clare"	1862	S. T. Gordon		
"Give the Stranger Happy Cheer"	1851	F. D. Benteen		
"Give This to Mother"	1864	P. A. Wundermann	S. W. Harding	
"Give Us This Day Our Daily Bread"	1863	Horace Waters		
"The Glendy Burk"	1860	Firth, Pond & Co.		
"The Great Baby Show" or "The Abolition Show"	1856 (September 26)	Pittsburgh Post		
"Happy Hours At Home"	1862	John J. Daly		
"Hard Times Come Again No More" or "Hard Times"	1855	Firth, Pond & Co.		
"He Leadeth Me Beside Still Waters"	1863	Horace Waters	Joseph Gilmore	
"Heavenly Echoes"	1867	C. M. Tremaine	Compiled by Horace Waters	
"The Holiday Schottisch"	1853	Firth, Pond & Co.		
"The Hour for Thee & Me"	1852			
"Hurrah for the Bigler Boys"	1851	Fletcher Hodges, Jr.		
"I Cannot Sing to Night"	1852	Firth, Pond & Co.	George F. Banister	
"I See Her Still in My Dreams"	1857	Firth, Pond & Co.		
"I Will Be True to Thee"	1862	Horace Waters		
"I Would Not Die In Spring Time"	1850	F. D. Benteen		
"I Would Not Die In Summer Time"	1851	F. D. Benteen		
"I'd Be a Fairy"	1863	S. T. Gordon		
"I'll Be a Soldier"	1861	John J. Daly		
"I'll Be Home to Morrow"	1862	Firth, Pond & Co.		
"If You've Only Got a Moustache"	1864	Horace Waters	George Cooper	
"Irene"	1854	Firth, Pond & Co.		
"Jeanie with the Light Brown Hair"	1854	Firth, Pond & Co.		
"Jennie's Own Schottisch"	1854	Firth, Pond & Co.		
"Jenny June"	1863	Firth, Pond & Co.	George Cooper	
"Jenny's Coming O'er the Green"	1860 (July)	Clark's School Visitor Magazine		
"Katy Bell"	1863	S. T. Gordon	George Cooper	
"Kiss Me Dear Mother (Ere I Die)"	1869	Wm. A. Pond & Co.		
"Kissing In the Dark"	1863	John J. Daly	George Cooper	
"Larry's Good Bye"	1853	S. T. Gordon	George Cooper	
"Laura Lee"	1851	F. D. Benteen		
"Leave Me With My Mother"	1863	Horace Waters		
"Lena Our Loved One is Gone"	1863	John J. Daly	George Cooper	
"Lily Ray"	1850	Firth, Pond & Co.		
"Linda Has Departed"	1859	Firth, Pond & Co.	William Henry McCarthy	
"Linger In Blissful Repose"	1858	Firth, Pond & Co.		
"The Little Ballad Girl" or "'Tis My Father's Song"	1860 (December)	Clark's School Visitor Magazine		
"Little Belle Clair"	1861	John J. Daly		
"Little Ella"	1853	Firth, Pond & Co.		
"Little Ella's an Angel!"	1863	Horace Waters		
"Little Jenny Dow"	1862	Horace Waters		
"Little Mac! Little Mac! You're the Very Man"	1864	J. Marsh	Likely written by Henrietta Foster Thornton, Stephen's sister	
"Lizzie Dies To-Night"	1861 (May)	Clark's School Visitor Magazine	Mary Rynon Reese	
"Long-Ago Day"		Shapiro, Bernstein & Co.		
"Lou'siana Belle"	1847	W. C. Peters & Co.		
"The Love I Bear to Thee"	1863	Horace Waters		
"Lula Is Gone"	1858	Firth, Pond & Co.		
"Maggie by My Side"	1852	Firth, Pond & Co.		
"Maria Bach Waltz"	1944	Evelyn Foster Morneweck, Chronicles of Stephen Foster's Family		
"Mary Loves the Flowers"	1850	Firth, Pond & Co.		
"Massa's In de Cold Ground" (“Oh, Dem Watermelons”)	1852	Firth, Pond & Co.		
"Melinda May"	1851	F. D. Benteen		
"Merry Little Birds Are We"	1862	Horace Waters		
"The Merry, Merry Month of May"	1862 (May)	Clark's School Visitor Magazine		
"Mine Is the Mourning Heart"	1861 (July)	Clark's School Visitor Magazine		
"Molly"				
"Molly Dear Good Night"	1861	Firth, Pond & Co.		
"Molly! Do You Love Me?"	1850	F. D. Benteen		
"Mother, Thou'rt Faithful to Me"	1851	F. D. Benteen		
"Mr. & Mrs. Brown"	1864	Horace Waters	George Cooper	
"My Angel Boy, I Cannot See Thee Die"	1865	Wm. A. Pond & Co.	H. Brougham	
"My Boy Is Coming From the War"	1863	S. T. Gordon	George Cooper	
"My Brudder Gum"	1849	Firth, Pond & Co.		
"My Hopes Have Departed Forever"	1851	Firth, Pond & Co.	James Gates Percival	
"My Loved One and My Own" or "Eva"	1858	Firth, Pond & Co.		
"My Old Kentucky Home, Good Night" or "My Old Kentucky Home"	1853	Firth, Pond & Co.		
"My Wife Is a Most Knowing Woman"	1863	Horace Waters	George Cooper	
"Nell and I"	1861	John J. Daly		
"Nelly Bly"	1850	Firth, Pond & Co.		
"Nelly Was a Lady"	1849	Firth, Pond & Co.		
"No Home, No Home"	1862	John J. Daly		
"None Shall Weep a Tear for Me"	1860	Firth, Pond & Co.	Richard Henry Wilde	
"Nothing But a Plain Old Soldier"	1863	John J. Daly		
"Oh! 'Tis Glorious!"	1863	Horace Waters	Edward Nevin	
"Oh! Boys Carry Me 'Long"	1851	Firth, Pond & Co.		
"Oh! Lemuel!"	1850	F. D. Benteen		
"Oh! Susanna" or "Susanna"	1848	C. Holt, Jr.	First performance 1847	
"Oh! Tell Me of My Mother"	1861	John J. Daly		
"Oh! There's No Such Girl As Mine" or "There's No Such Girl As Mine"	1863	Horace Waters	Samuel Lover	
"Oh, Why Am I So Happy?"	1863	Horace Waters	Francis D. Murtha	
"Old Black Joe"	1860	Firth, Pond & Co.		
"Old Dog Tray"	1853	Firth, Pond & Co.		
"Old Folks At Home" or "Swanee River" or "Way Down Upon de Swanee River"	1851	Firth, Pond & Co.		
"Old Folks Quadrilles"	1853	Firth, Pond & Co.		
"Old Memories"	1853	Firth, Pond & Co.		
"Old Uncle Ned" or "Uncle Ted"	1848	Millets Music Saloon		
"Once I Loved Thee Mary Dear"	1851	Firth, Pond & Co.	William Cullen Crookshank	
"Onward and Upward!"	1863	Horace Waters	George Cooper	
"Open Thy Lattice Love"	1844	George Willig	George P. Morris	
"Our Bright Summer Days Are Gone" or "Our Bright Bright Summer Days Are Gone"	1861	John J. Daly		
"Our Willie Dear Is Dying"	1861	Firth, Pond & Co.		
"Over the River"	1863	Horace Waters		
"Parthenia to Ingomar"	1859	Firth, Pond & Co.	William Henry McCarthy	
"A Penny for Your Thoughts"	1861	Horace Waters		
"Poor Drooping Maiden"	1860	Firth, Pond & Co.		
"Praise the Lord!"	1867	C. M. Tremaine	Compiled by Horace Waters	
"The Pure, The Bright, The Beautiful"	1863	Horace Waters		
"Ring, Ring de Banjo" or "Ring de Banjo"	1851	Firth, Pond & Co.		
"Sadly to Mine Heart Appealing"	1858	Firth, Pond & Co.	Eliza Sheridan Carey	
"Santa Anna's Retreat From Buena Vista"	1848	Firth, Pond & Co.		
"Seek and Ye Shall Find"	1863	Horace Waters		
"She Was All the World to Me"	1864	Horace Waters	Dr. Duffy	
"Sitting By My Own Cabin Door"	1864	John J. Daly		
"Slumber My Darling"	1862	Horace Waters		
"Soiree Polka"	1850	W. C. Peters		
"A Soldier In de Colored Brigade"	1863	Firth, Pond & Co.	George Cooper	
"The Soldier's Home"	1863	S. T. Gordon	George Cooper	
"Some Folks"	1855	Firth, Pond & Co.		
"Somebody's Coming to See Me to Night"	1864	D. S. Holmes	George Cooper	
"The Song of All Songs"	1863	D. S. Holmes		
"The Spirit of My Song"	1850	F. D. Benteen	Netta Victoria Fuller	
"Stand Up For the Truth"	1863	Horace Waters		
"Stay Summer Breath"	1848	W. C. Peters & Co.		
"Suffer Little Children to Come Unto Me"	1863	Horace Waters		
"Summer Longings"	1849	W. C. Peters & Co.	Denis Florence McCarthy	
"Sweet Emerald Isle That I Love So Well"	1866	John J. Daly	George Cooper	
"Sweet Little Maid of the Mountain"	1861	John J. Daly		
"Sweetly She Sleeps, My Alice Fair"	1851	F. D. Benteen	Charles G. Eastman	
"Tears Bring Thoughts of Heaven"	1863	Horace Waters		
"Tell Me Love of Thy Early Dreams"	1864	John J. Daly		
"Tell Me of the Angels, Mother"	1864	John J. Daly		
"That's What's the Matter"	1862	Firth, Pond & Co.		
"The Social Orchestra"	1854	Firth, Pond & Co.		
"There Are Plenty of Fish In the Sea"	1862	Horace Waters	George Cooper	
"There Was a Time"	1863	S. T. Gordon	James D. Byrne	
"There's a Good Time Coming"	1846	Peters & Field	Charles Mackay	
"This Rose Will Remind You" or "My Story of Love"		Shapiro, Bernstein & Co.	New lyrics by Jack Lawrence	
"Thou Are the Queen of My Song"	1859	Firth, Pond & Co.		
"A Thousand Miles From Home"	1870	John J. Daly		
"The Tioga Waltz"	1896	Morrison Foster, Biography: Songs and Musical Compositions of Stephen C. Foster		
"Turn Not Away!"	1850	F. D. Benteen		
"Under the Willow She's Sleeping"	1860	Firth, Pond & Co.		
"The Village Bells, Polka"	1850	F. D. Benteen		
"Village Festival (Quadrilles Nos. 1-4)"	1854	Firth, Pond & Co.		
"The Village Maiden"	1855	Firth, Pond & Co.		
"Virginia Belle"	1860	Firth, Pond & Co.		
"The Voice of By Gone Days"	1850	Firth, Pond & Co.		
"The Voices that Are Gone"	1865	Wm. A. Pond & Co.		
"Was My Brother In the Battle?"	1862	Horace Waters		
"Waters' Golden Harp" or "Water's Choral Harp"	1863	Horace Waters		
"Way Down In Ca-i-ro"	1850	Firth, Pond & Co.		
"Way Down South In Alabama"	1848	Millets Music Saloon		
"We Are Coming Father Abraham, 300,000 More"	1862	S. T. Gordon	James Sloane Gibbons	
"We Will Keep a Bright Lookout"	1863	Horace Waters	George Cooper	
"We'll All Meet Our Saviour"	1863	Horace Waters		
"We'll Still Keep Marching On"	1863	Horace Waters	Mary Ann Kidder	
"We'll Tune Our Hearts"	1863	Horace Waters		
"We've a Million In the Field"	1862	S. T. Gordon		
"What Does Every Good Child Say?"	1867	C. M. Tremaine	Compiled by Horace Waters	
"What Must a Fairy's Dream Be?"	1847	W. C. Peters		
"What Shall the Harvest Be?"	1863	Horace Waters	Emily Sullivan Oakey	
"When Dear Friends Are Gone"	1864	P. A. Wundermann		
"When Old Friends Were Here"	1864	Horace Waters	George Cooper	
"When This Dreadful War Is Ended" or "When This War Is Ended"	1863	Horace Waters	George Cooper	
"Where Has Lula Gone"	1858	Firth, Pond & Co.		
"Where Is Thy Spirit Mary"	1895	Geo. Mercer, Jr.	View the archived, handwritten manuscript	
"Where We Work for the Lord"	1863	Horace Waters		
"The White House Chair"	1856 (September 29)	Pittsburgh Post		
"Why Have My Loved Ones Gone?"	1861	Horace Waters		
"Why No One to Love?"	1862	S. T. Gordon		
"The Wife or He'll Come Home"	1860	Firth, Pond & Co.		
"Willie Has Gone to War"	1863	Wm. A. Pond & Co.	View the archived, handwritten manuscript	
"Willie My Brave"	1851	Firth, Pond & Co.		
"Willie We Have Missed You"	1854	Firth, Pond & Co.		
"Willie's Gone to Heaven"	1863	Horace Waters		
"Wilt Thou Be Gone Love"	1851	Firth, Pond & Co.	William Shakespeare	
"Wilt Thou Be True?"	1864	Horace Waters	George Cooper	
