= Beecham =

Beecham is a surname. Notable people with the surname include:

- Audrey Beecham (1915–1989), poet and niece of the conductor
- Betty Humby Beecham (1908–1958), British pianist and wife of the conductor
- Earl Beecham (born 1965), American football player
- Emily Beecham (born 1984), English actress
- Ernie Beecham (1906–1985), English footballer
- Jeremy Beecham (1944–2026), British Labour politician
- John Beecham (1787–1856), English Wesleyan writer
- Sir Joseph Beecham, 1st Baronet (1848–1916), eldest son of Thomas Beecham the chemist
- Thomas Beecham (1879–1961), British conductor
- Thomas Beecham (chemist) (1820–1907), British chemist, grandfather of the conductor
- Sinclair Beecham, British entrepreneur

== See also ==
- Beecham baronets, a baronetcy created for Joseph Beecham
- Beecham Group, a British pharmaceutical business founded Thomas Beecham, now part of GlaxoSmithKline
  - Beecham's Pills. a laxative and first product
- Beacham
- Beauchamp (disambiguation)
