= John Beecham (disambiguation) =

John Beecham (1787–1856) was an English Wesleyan writer.

John Beecham may also refer to:

- John Beecham, trombonist on The Kinks album Misfits
- John Beecham, presumed 4th Baronet (1940–2011), of the Beecham baronets

== See also ==
- Jack Beacham (1902–1982), English footballer
- Beecham
