= Beacham =

Beacham is a surname.

Notable people with the surname include:

- Braxton Beacham (1864–1924), Mayor of Orlando, Florida (1902)
- Jack Beacham (1902–1982), English footballer
- Joseph Beacham (1874–1958), American football college coach
- Stephanie Beacham (born 1947), English actress
- Susan Beacham (born 1958), American personal finance expert
- Travis Beacham (born 1980), American screenwriter

Places that begin with "Beacham" include:

- Beacham Theatre (built 1921), historic cinema in Orlando, Florida constructed by Braxton Beacham

== See also ==
- Beauchamp (disambiguation)
- Beecham
- Miller & Beacham, music publishing company
