= Medicine in the Asante Empire =

Medicine in the Asante Empire consisted of the use of herbal medicines. 19th century visitors to Asante documented various plants used for preparing medicine. Since the 18th century, Muslims from the northern regions of modern Ghana, settled in Kumasi where they were incorporated into the physician class. In the urban areas of the empire, medical practitioners were centralised, but the upper class was more likely to receive access to quality health care. Diseases common in the region included yaws and syphilis. Non herbal practices ranging from surgery to bone-setting were available.

== Background ==
=== Sources ===
Documentation on Asante diseases and health care include the work of Henry Tedlie, who was a physician and part of Bowdich's diplomatic mission to Kumasi in 1817. While in Kumasi, Tedlie recorded twenty-seven diseases in Asante as well as thirty-seven plants used as cures. After his death, Tedlie's work was published in 1819 by Bowdich with the aid of botanist Robert Brown.

=== Diseases ===
The diseases most common in Ashantee country are the Lues, Yaws, Itch, Ulcers, Scald-head and gripping pain in the bowels...

— Teddlie (1817)

Smallpox and dysentery was also problematic during military campaigns. In the 19th century, the Asante washed and bathed daily, which Scholar D. Maier states to have helped prevent the spread of tick, louse and fecal-borne diseases.

== Organization ==
Physicians were known as summani (Note: (Plural) sumankwafo) and they trained in herbalism. Spiritual or paranormal diseases on the other hand were attended by the Okomfo. Training for expertise in medicine was noted by John Beecham who wrote in the mid-19th century:

...in cases of bodily affliction a medical preparation is ordered for the patient. It has already been noticed that the fetish men and women apply themselves assiduously to the study of the healing art and acqure such a knowledge of the properties of herbs and plants as enables them to effect the cure of many complaints...

— Beecham (1841)

In urban Asante, all physicians were organized and specialized under the Nsumankwaafiesu. This was described by Asantehene Prempeh I in a 1928 letter of explanation to the colonial District Commissioner of Kumasi as; "the pharmacology where we had well trained and qualified physicians in charge whose duty was to attend to the sick and injured." The head of this office was the Nsumankwahene who served as the native doctor of the state and doctor of the Asantehene. It was during the reign of Opoku Ware I where "all fetish priests and medicine men in the state were requested to serve the King under the Nsumankwahene."

During the reign of Osei Kwame, Muslim settlers from northern Ghana were incorporated into the Nsumakwaafo or physicians of Kumasi. The Muslim populace in Kumasi also provided charms, amulets and prayers that were believed to cure diseases. In the early 19th century, a Muslim staff were documented to have been tasked in recording the casualties of the Asante army.

Tedlie also wrote on the disparity of access to medical care as the higher class were more likely to receive skilled medical attention. According to scholar Donna Maier, preventive measures were taken as a Public Works Department existed under the stool called Akwammofo Akonnwa. This department was responsible for cleaning the streets of Kumasi daily and it ensured that the people had kept their compounds clean and weeded.

=== Practices ===
Herbal medicine was applied to treat sprains, constipation, venereal disease, external inflammation, ophthalmia, boils and acute diarrhea. Variolation in Asante was recorded in 1817. To inoculate against smallpox, Bowdich wrote;

They take the matter, and puncture the patient in seven places, both on the arms and legs. The sickness continues but a few days, and rarely any person dies of it...

— Bowdich

Prionsers of war were rejected if they had the disease. There were check points at Asante borders that prevented people from progressing to Asante if they exhibited signs of smallpox. Those who discovered signs after crossing the borders were prevented from entering Kumasi and quarantined in remote villages.

There is evidence from the 19th century that the Asante practiced bone-setting. A fracture of an arm or leg was bound with splints. Various surgical practices were familiar in the empire. Muslim doctors in Asante practiced bleeding, lancing, cupping and they made use of the hot iron.

Physicians followed the army and they cared for the wounded. The Asante were noted for their inability to heal extreme gunshot wounds by early 19th century writers like Bowdich and Tedlie.

== Herbal medicine ==
Tedlie's 1817 records on thirty-seven Asante medicinal plants are reviewed in McCaskie (2017)

Asante Herbal Medicines
Botanical name	Twi name in 1817	Uses
Chrysanthellum procubens	Cutturasuh	Decoction for purgative.
Ficus	Adumba	Bark and fruit are pounded with a plant called awhinteywhinting by the Asante and further boiled in fish soup to cause abortion.
Gloriosa superba	Koofoobah	Mixed with Mallguetta pepper to apply on a sprained ancle.
Cupania or Trichilia	Tandoorue	Pounded and boiled with Mallaguetta pepper for pain in belly
Sterculia acuminata	Bissey	Chewed on journeys to prevent hunger
Blighia sapida	Attueh	Anti-veneral
Ricinus Communis	No Asante name given. McCaskie suggests the modern abronkuruma	Not used as a medicine, although McCaskie states its modern uses include application on rashes and as purgatives
Two species of Leucas	Apooder	Its leaves are bruised and mixed with lime-juice to be applied on inflammations
A species of Urtica	Hooghong	Bruised and mixed with chalk to correct stomach acidity and heartburn in pregnant women
Heliotropium indicum	Accocottocotorawah	Snuffed up the nostrils to treat severe headach. Smoke of the plant is also inhaled.
Acalypha ciliata	Crowera	Bruised with lesser cardamom seed and rubbed on chest or side pains.
A species of Vitis	Enminim	The juice of the leaves is dropped into eyes affected with ophthalmia
Leptanthus?	Secoco	Pounded with lime-juice and rubbed on body to treat itch.
Likely Ocimun canum Sims and O. gratissimum	Ammo	Juice is applied to cuts and bruises
Possibly a Piper	Petey	Leaves are pounded and applied as plaister on inflammatory swellings and boils
laportea ovalifolia?	Abromotome	Bruised leaves are used to treat boils
Syngenesious plant related to Cacalia	Yangkompro	Pounded leaves are applied to cuts and contusions.
Musanga cecropioides	Oeduema	Boiled in soup and used as an emmenagogue.
Possibly Aneilema	Semeney	Pounded leaves are used to treat boils and pus
Sterculia	Wowwah	Inner bark is mixed with Mallaguetta pepper and drank for colic and stomach pains
Hilleria latifolia?	Anafranakoo	Bruised leaves are used to treat boils and inflammatory swelling
Leea Sambucina	Kattacaiben	Decoction of leaves is drank every morning by pregnant women to treat uneasiness in the abdomen
Species of Piper related to umbellatum	Aserumbdrue	Leaves are used in soup to cure belly swellings
Possibly Dracaena mannii	Ocisseeree	Bark of tree is used to stop dysentery and diarrhoea
Paullinia Africana	Gingang	Treat pain in the side
Possibly Zingiber officianale	Cudeyakoo	Pounded leaves and stalk are applied to eruptions on head. Also mixed with lime-juice to treat yaws.
(Unkonwn) and Hedysari species	Affeuah and Nuinnuerafuh	Leaves mixed and rubbed on body and limb pains
Paullinia Africana	Adummah	Treat dysentery
Probably Menispermum	Tointinney	Chewed with Mallaguetta pepper to cure cough
Leguminous plant, likely a Robinia	Apussey	Bark is pounded with Mallaguetta pepper to treat headache
Likely Dioclea reflexa	Thuguamah	Bark is pounded and drank in palm wine with Mallaguetta pepper, to cure belly pains.
Unknown toadstool	Conkknoney	Function is unknown but Tedlie writes that it is used with Mallaguetta pepper and lime-juice.
Brillantaisia owariensis	Suetinney	Decotion of leaves drank to cure belly pain.
Tetandra Monogynia	Soominna	Bruised with lime-juice to treat cough.
Scoparia dulcis	Thattha	Juice is dropped into ears when pained.
Melia azedarach	Aquey	Leave decoction is used with palm wine as a corroborant.
Mussaenda fulgens	Dammaram	Function not stated. McCaskie gives the modern uses for cough treatment and elephantiasis.
