= Beauchamp =

Beauchamp may refer to:

== People ==
=== Surname ===
- Beauchamp (surname), including a list of people with the surname

=== Families ===
- Family name of the Earls and Duke of Warwick, first creation (1268–1492)
- Family name of several creations of Barons Beauchamp
- Family name of:
  - Barons Bergavenny, second creation (1392–1447)
  - Earl of Worcester, third creation (1420–1422)
- Family name of Beauchamp, Baron St Amand
- Family name of the Barons of Bedford, of the first creation
- Earl Beauchamp, a title held by the Lygon family
- Viscount Beauchamp, a subsidiary title of the Marquess of Hertford, second creation
- Viscount Beauchamp of Hache, a subsidiary title of the Duke of Somerset, first creation
- Beauchamp baronets

=== Given name ===
- Beauchamp Bagenal, an Irish rake from Bagenalstown, County Carlow
- Beauchamp Seymour, 1st Baron Alcester, a British admiral
- Beauchamp Duff, a Scottish officer who served as Commander-in-Chief of India during World War I
- Beauchamp Tower, English inventor and railway engineer
- James Beauchamp Clark, or Champ Clark, a prominent American politician

== Places ==
=== Australia ===
- Beauchamp, Victoria, in Victoria

=== England ===
- Acton Beauchamp, a village in Herefordshire
- Beauchamp Place, a shopping street in the Knightsbridge area of London
- Beauchamp Roding, a village in Essex
- Compton Beauchamp, a village in Oxfordshire
- Drayton Beauchamp, a village in Buckinghamshire
- Hatch Beauchamp, a village in Somerset
- Kibworth Beauchamp, a village in Leicestershire
- Naunton Beauchamp, a village in Worcestershire
- Shelsley Beauchamp, a village in Worcestershire
- Shepton Beauchamp, a village in Somerset

=== France ===
- Montigny–Beauchamp station, on the Paris Metro
- Beauchamp, Val-d'Oise, in the Val-d'Oise département

== Other uses ==
- Beauchamp College, a further education community college in Oadby, UK
- Beauchamp House, in Westover, Maryland, US

== See also ==
- Beacham
- Beauchamps (disambiguation)
- Beauchamp–Sharp Tragedy, the murder of Kentucky legislator Solomon P. Sharp by Jereboam O. Beauchamp
- Beauchamp-Feuillet notation, a system of dance notation
- Beecham
