= Christopher Meineke =

American organist and composer (1782–1850)

Christopher Meineke (né Christoph Meineke; 1 May 1782, Oldenburg – 6 November 1850, Baltimore) was an American organist and composer.

== Life ==
Born in Oldenburg, he later moved to England around 1810 and eventually settled in Baltimore in 1820. (Note: There is a conflicting report that Meineke came to America in 1800.) Meineke's secular works were published by the Baltimore-based music printer, John Cole. As a composer, his alternative first names were Charles and Karl. Meineke was known for his interests in medieval and early Christian-themed composition, such as recreating Gloria Patri (Glory Be to the Father) or composing with the help of medieval era-evoking works by Felicia Hemans in a much more contemporary setting.

== Compositions ==
- The Bird at Sea
- A New Instruction for the Piano Forte
- Works for the Fourth of July
