= Thomas Beecham selected discography =

Selected discography of recordings conducted by Thomas Beecham:

- J.S. Bach
  - Phoebus and Pan
- Balakirev
  - Symphony No. 1 – Royal Philharmonic Orchestra (RPO)
- Balfe
  - The Bohemian Girl
- Beethoven
  - Piano Concerto No. 4 – Arthur Rubinstein/London Philharmonic Orchestra (LPO)
  - The Ruins of Athens– Beecham Choral Society/ RPO
  - Symphony No. 2 – RPO
  - Symphony No. 7 – RPO
  - Symphony No. 8– RPO
  - Fidelio
- Benjamin
  - The Devil Take Her
- Berlioz
  - La damnation de Faust – RPO
  - Harold in Italy – Riddle/RPO
  - King Lear Overture – RPO
  - Le Corsaire Overture – RPO
  - Les Francs Juges Overture – RPO
  - Les Troyens Overture – RPO
  - Roman Carnival Overture – RPO
  - Symphonie fantastique – RPO
  - Trojan March – RPO (one of his last recordings, made in stereo in December 1959)
  - Waverley Overture – RPO
- Bizet
  - Carmen – Victoria de Los Angeles, Nicolai Gedda/French National Radio Orchestra
  - Carnaval à Rome – RPO
  - La jolie fille de Perth suite – RPO
  - L'Arlésienne Suites 1 & 2 – RPO
  - Patrie Overture – RPO
  - Symphony in C – French National Radio Orchestra
- Boccherini
  - Overture in D – RPO
- Borodin
  - Polovetsian Dances – Beecham Choral Society/RPO
- Brahms
  - Academic Festival Overture – RPO
  - Symphony No. 2 – RPO
  - Tragic Overture – LPO
- Chabrier
  - España, rapsodie pour orchestre – RPO
  - Gwendoline Overture – French National Radio Orchestra
  - Joyeuse marche – RPO
- Cherubini
  - Les deux journées – RPO
- Debussy
  - Cortège & Air de danse – RPO
  - Prélude à l'après-midi d'un faune – RPO
  - L'Enfant prodigue
  - Pelléas et Mélisande
- Delibes
  - Le roi s'amuse – RPO
- Delius
  - Appalachia – BBC Chorus/LPO
  - Brigg Fair – RPO
  - Dance Rhapsody No. 2 – RPO
  - Fennimore and Gerda Intermezzo – RPO
  - Florida Suite: Daybreak & Dance – RPO
  - Irmelin Prelude – RPO
  - A Mass of Life
  - On Hearing the First Cuckoo in Spring – RPO
  - Sleighride – RPO
  - A Song Before Sunrise – RPO
  - Summer Evening – RPO
  - Summer Night on the River – RPO
- Dvořák
  - Legend in G minor – RPO
  - Slavonic Rhapsody No. 3 – LPO
  - Symphony No. 8 – RPO
- Fauré
  - Dolly Suite – French National Radio Orchestra
  - Pavane – French National Radio Orchestra
- Franck
  - Symphony in D minor – French National Radio Orchestra
- Goldmark
  - Rustic Wedding Symphony – RPO
- Gounod
  - Faust Ballet music – RPO
  - Le sommeil de Juliette – RPO
- Grétry
  - Zémire et Azore ballet music – RPO
- Grieg
  - Peer Gynt Suites – RPO
  - Symphonic dance in A – RPO
- Handel
  - Amaryllis – RPO
  - Love in Bath – RPO
  - Messiah (complete) – Jon Vickers et al./ RPO
  - Solomon (complete) – John Cameron/ RPO
  - The Faithful Shepherd – RPO
  - The Gods Go A'Begging – RPO
  - The Great Elopement – LPO
- Haydn
  - Symphonies 93 – 104 – RPO
  - The Seasons – Morison, Young, Langdon /RPO
- Lalo
  - Symphony – RPO
- Massenet
  - Last sleep of the Virgin – RPO
  - Waltz from Cendrillon – RPO
- Mendelssohn
  - Fair Melusine Overture – RPO
  - Symphony No. 4, Italian – RPO**(Mendelssohn) I Violin concerto (Szigeti)/LPO
- Mozart
  - Clarinet Concerto – Jack Brymer/RPO
  - The Magic Flute Overture – RPO
  - The Magic Flute (complete) – Lemnitz, Roswaenge, Berlin Philharmonic
  - Flute & Harp Concerto – Le Roy, Laskine/RPO
  - Concerto for Violin in D, K 218—Szigeti - LPO
  - German Dance K605 – RPO
  - Haffner March K249 – RPO
  - The Marriage of Figaro Overture – LPO
  - Minuet from Divertimento in D K131 – RPO
  - Requiem – Morison et al./RPO
  - Symphony No. 31 – Suisse Romande Orchestra
  - Symphony No. 34 – Suisse Romande Orchestra
  - Symphony No. 35 – LPO
  - Symphony No. 36 – LPO
  - Symphony No. 38 – LPO
  - Symphony No. 39 – Suisse Romande Orchestra
  - Symphony No. 40 – LPO
  - Symphony No. 41 – RPO
  - Thamos: Entr'acte – RPO
- Mussorgsky
  - Khovanshchina Dance of the Persian Slaves – RPO
- Offenbach
  - Les contes d'Hoffmann suite – RPO
- Sergei Prokofiev
  - Violin concerto no 1 op. 19—Szigeti/LPO
- Puccini
  - La Bohème – Jussi Bjorling, Victoria de Los Angeles/ RCA Victor Symphony Orchestra
- Rimsky-Korsakov
  - Scheherazade – RPO
- Rossini
  - La Cambiale di matrimonio Overture – RPO
  - La Gazza Ladra Overture – RPO
  - Semiramide Overture – RPO
- Saint-Saëns
  - Le Rouet d'Omphale – RPO
  - Samson & Dalila Dance of the Priestesses/ Bacchanale – RPO
- Schubert
  - Symphony No. 1 – RPO
  - Symphony No. 2 – RPO
  - Symphony No. 3 – RPO
  - Symphony No. 5 – RPO
  - Symphony No. 6 – RPO
  - Symphony No. 8 – RPO
- Sibelius
  - Symphony No. 2 – BBC Symphony Orchestra
  - Symphony No. 4 – LPO
  - Symphony No. 6 – RPO
  - Symphony No. 7 – RPO
  - Tapiola – LPO
  - Valse Triste – RPO
  - Karelia Suite – RPO
- Smetana
  - The Bartered Bride Overture and Polka– RPO
- Strauss
  - Don Quixote – Wallenstein/New York Philharmonic Orchestra
  - Ein Heldenleben – RPO (this recording, on a Capitol LP Release, contains a difficult to explain disconnect between the two sides of the orchestra, as 1 side plays a measure behind the other. This oddity takes place just after the second brass fanfare just at the end of side 1. This strange moment does not happen on the CD or EMI LP release. Can someone out there explain this? It is clearly not just a missed mistake by the orchestra, but a major mastering error. Please post your answer here, but you will have to be a musician who can follow the dense scoring in Strauss's Ein Heldenleben.)
- Suppé
  - Morning Noon and Night – RPO
  - Poet & Peasant Overture – RPO
- Tchaikovsky
  - Eugene Onegin, waltz – RPO
  - Francesca da Rimini – LPO
  - Symphony No. 5 – LPO
- Vidal
  - Zino Zina Gavotte – RPO
- Wagner
  - Die Meistersinger von Nürnberg Prelude and Suite – RPO
  - The Flying Dutchman Overture – RPO
  - Götterdämmerung Funeral March and Rhine Journey – RPO
  - Lohengrin Prelude – RPO
  - Parsifal Karfreitagszauber – RPO
- Weber
  - Der Freischütz Overture – LPO
  - Oberon Overture – LPO
