= Beauchamps =

Beauchamps (French for beautiful fields) may refer to several communes in France:

- Beauchamps, Manche, in the Manche département
- Beauchamps, Somme, in the Somme département
- Beauchamps-sur-Huillard, in the Loiret département

== See also ==
- Beauchamp (disambiguation)
