= Joshua McCarter Simpson =

American poet

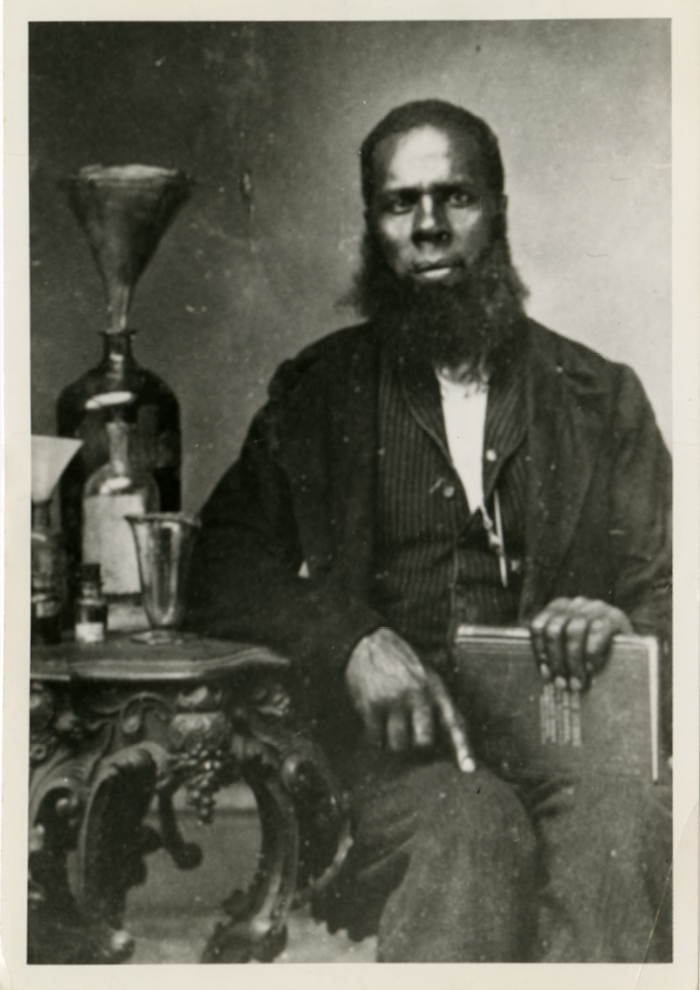

Joshua McCarter Simpson (ca. 1820 - April 20, 1877) was a store proprietor, herbalist, poet and lyricist in the United States. He lamented the enslavement of African Americans, called out the hypocrisy of white Christian abusers, and denounced the brutal treatment and discrimination African Americans received. His songs were published in 1854 as The Emancipation Car: Being an Original Composition of Anti-Slavery Ballads, Composed Exclusively for the Underground Railroad. His work was well known and widely circulated during his lifetime. Alternative first (John) and last names (McCarty) have been noted.

He was fostered before being leased out as an orphan. He was indentured until age 21. He attended an Abolitionist school in Big Bottom, Ohio and Oberlin Collegiate Institute in Oberlin, Ohio. He wrote anti-slavery verses and set them to popular tunes.

He had a store and medical practice in Zanesville, Ohio. Vicki L. Eakler wrote a master's thesis on him in 1982 at Washington University in St. Louis.

The Zanesville Courier reported his death April 20, 1877 and ran an obituary for him the following day.

== Songs ==
- "The Proclamation Day" to the tune of "The Prisoner's Hope" / "Tramp! Tramp!! Tramp!!!", words and music by George Frederick Root published by Root & Cady
- "Let the Banner Proudly Wave" to "Nearer Our Happy Home"
- "The Fifteenth Amendment"
- "The Grand Jubilee" to the tune of "Annie of the Vale"
- "Away to Canada" to the tune of "Oh Susanna"
- "To the White People of America" to the tune "Massa's in the Cold, Cold Ground", a minstrel song composed by New York songwriter Stephen Foster in 1852
- "A Brother's Farewell (A Scene at the Slave Pen)" to the tune of Stephen Foster's "Hard Times Come Again No More"
- "No, Master, Never" to "Pop Goes the Weasel"
- "Song of the Aliened American" to the tune of "My Country, 'Tis of Thee"

== See also ==
- The Aliened American, a newspaper published in Cleveland, Ohio
