= Massa's in De Cold Ground =

1852 minstrel song by Stephen Foster

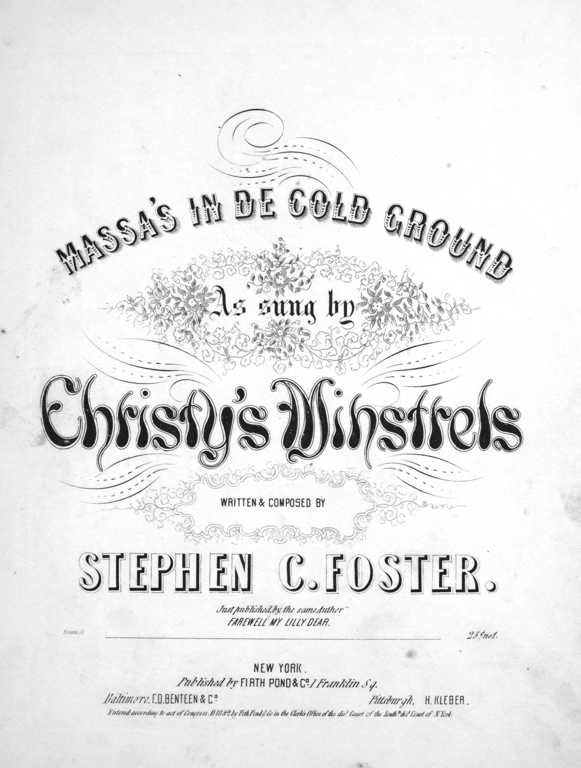

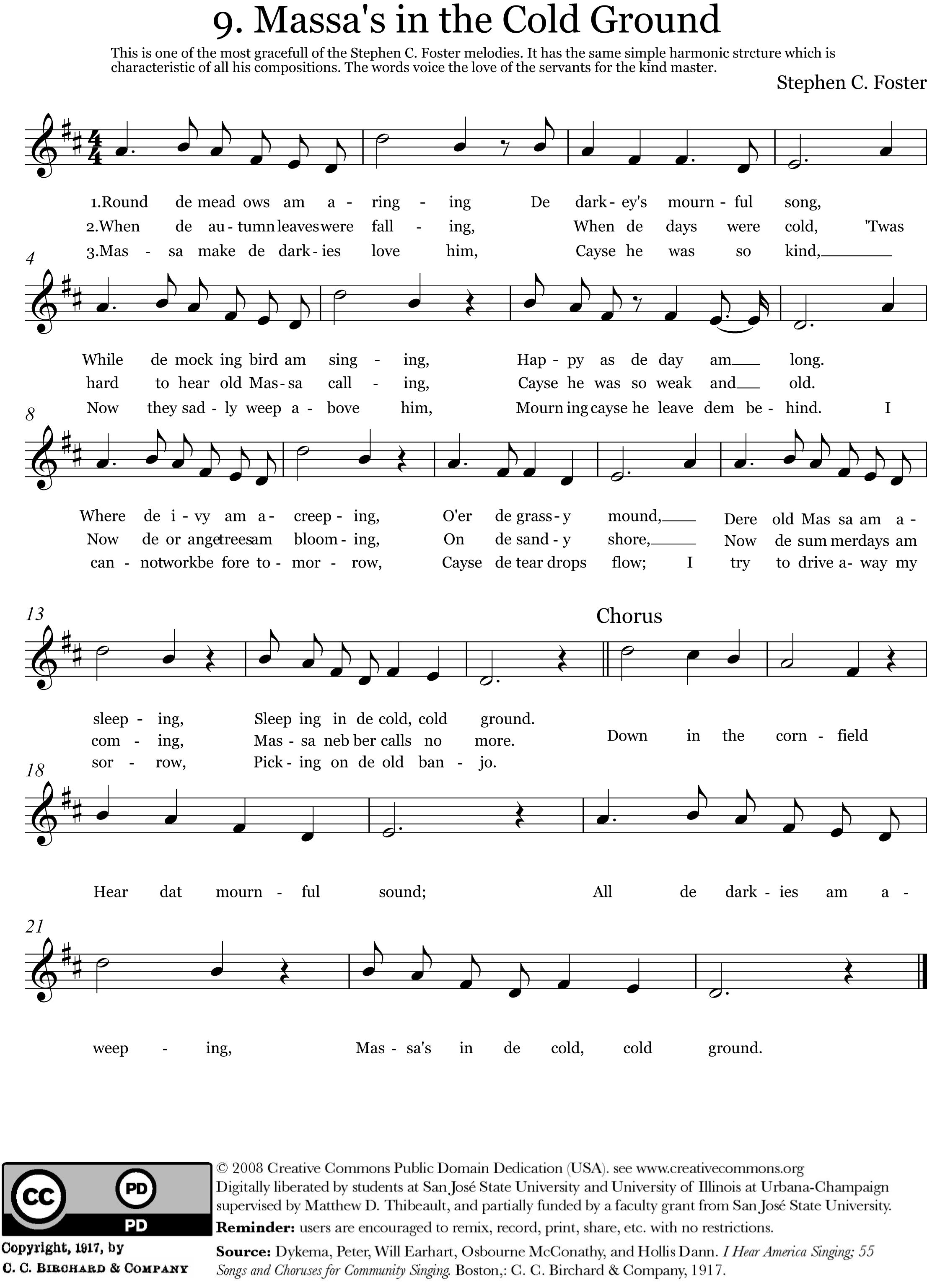
Sheet music version

Massa's in De Cold Ground (1852) is a song by Stephen Foster.

The song was included in the book 55 Songs and Choruses for Community Singing, published in 1917. According to the book, it is one of the most graceful of Stephen C. Foster's melodies. It also has a simple harmonic structure, characteristic of Foster's compositions. The lyrics voice the love of slaves for their enslaver. Abolitionist Joshua McCarter Simpson rewrote the lyrics and retitled the song "To the White People of America".

The song has been used by many musicians and groups including as Massa's in the Cold, Cold Ground. A rendition sung by Marguerite Dunlap was recorded on Victor Records.

Al Jolson recorded the song. Bewley's Chuck Wagon Gang recorded the song in 1936. Golden Gate Quartet recorded a rendition of it in 1937. A piano roll was made for it by Charles Grobe with Colorized Music. Frederick J. Bacon was recorded playing the song on a banjo (instrumental). The Haydn Quartet sung the song on a Gramophone recording #4253Y.

== Lyrics ==
VERSE 1

Round de meadows am a-ringing
De darkeys' mournful song,
While de mocking-bird am singing,
Happy as de day am long.
Where de ivy am a-creeping,
O'er de grassy mound,
Dere old massa am a-sleeping,
Sleeping in de cold, cold ground.

CHORUS

Down in de corn-field
Hear dat mournful sound:
All de darkeys am a-weeping,—
Massa's in de cold, cold ground.

VERSE 2

When de autumn leaves were falling,
When de days were cold,
'T was hard to hear old massa calling,
Cayse he was so weak and old.
Now de orange tree am blooming
On de sandy shore,
Now de summer days am coming,—
Massa nebber calls no more.

CHORUS

VERSE 3

Massa make de darkeys love him,
Cayse he was so kind;
Now dey sadly weep above him,
Mourning cayse he leave dem behind.
I cannot work before to-morrow,
Cayse de tear-drop flow;
I try to drive away my sorrow,
Pickin' on de old banjo.

CHORUS

== See also ==
- List of songs written by Stephen Foster
- Coon song
- Minstrel show
- Blackface
