= F. D. Benteen =

F. D. Benteen (died 1864) was an American sheet music publisher and composer during the 19th century, based out of Baltimore, Maryland. His compositions include the Civil War song "Joys That We've Tasted." As a publisher, he is perhaps best known for publishing many of the works of Stephen Foster. William Miller, later of Miller & Beacham, bought F.D. Benteen's publishing company in 1838. From about 1845 to 1861 he had music stores in Baltimore, where pianos were sold.
