= John Cole (music publisher) =

John Cole (bap. June 24, 1774 - August 17, 1855) was a British-born American music printer, publisher and composer based in Baltimore.

Born in Tewkesbury, England, he emigrated to Baltimore in 1785 with his family. He compiled nearly thirty different collections of sacred music for various church denominations. In 1802, he became a printer; several of his publications included compositions by him. In 1822 he opened a music shop, which became the most important seller of sheet music in Baltimore, and he worked as a music publisher until 1839. He was the first publisher to include a picture on the title page of his sheet music publications. In 1862, his firm was purchased by William Miller and Joseph R. Beacham, who renamed it Miller & Beacham.

== See also ==
- Christopher Meineke, one of the composers who published works through John Cole
