= Firth, Pond & Company =

American publisher of sheet music

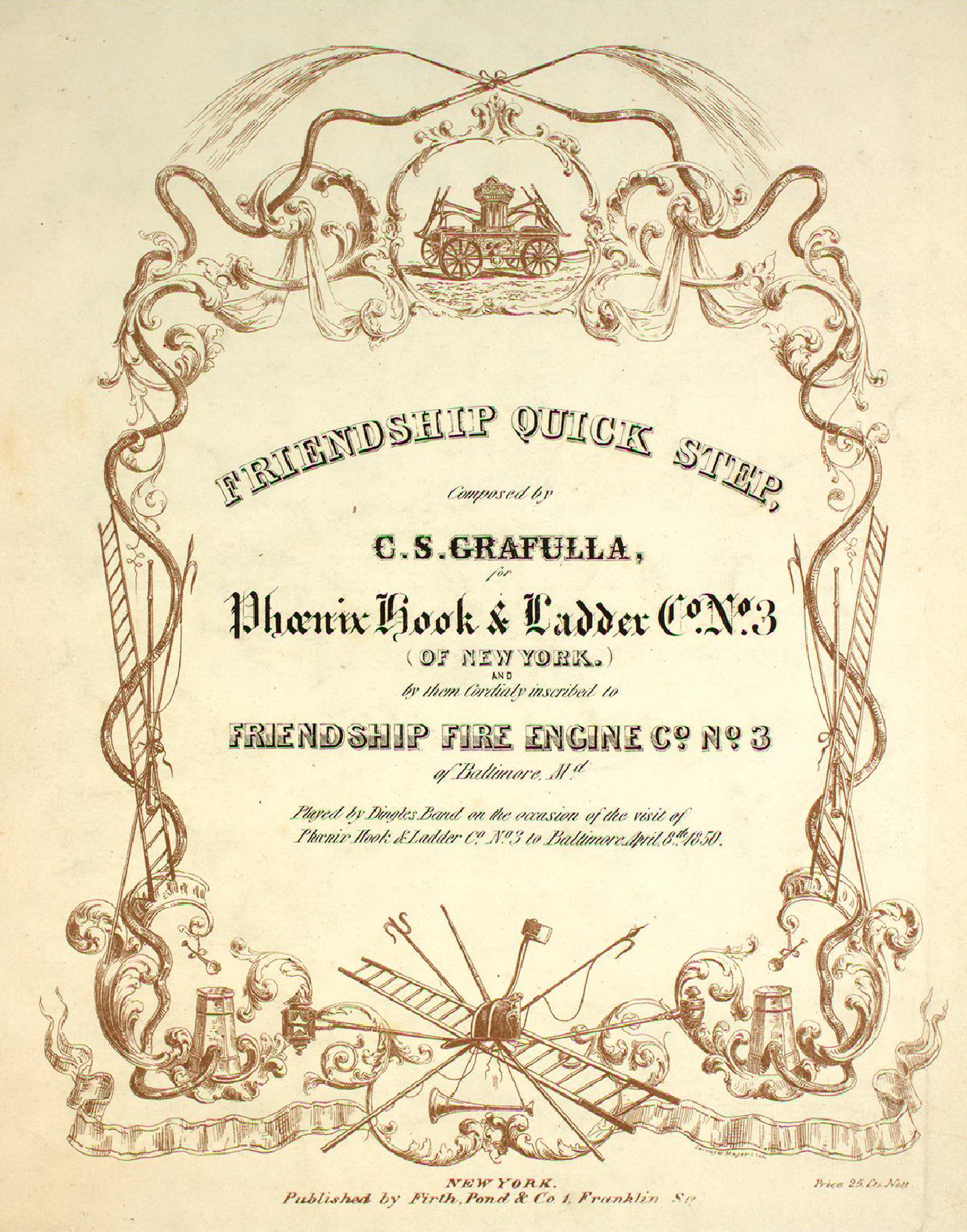
- Cover Sheet of the "Friendship Quick Step" by Claudio S. Grafulla, published by Firth, Pond & Company in 1850
- Status: Defunct
- Founded: 1847
- Founder: John Firth and Sylvanus Pond
- Country of origin: United States
- Headquarters location: New York City
- Publication types: sheet music

Firth, Pond & Company was an American music company that published sheet music and distributed musical instruments in the 19th and early 20th centuries. The company began in 1847 when William Hall broke with partners John Firth and Sylvanus Billings Pond (1792–1871), thus disbanding their New York-based publishing company, Firth & Hall.

== History ==
Firth and Pond reformed under the name Firth, Pond & Company. Publishing of sheet music made up their core business, and the company played a key role in the popularizing of works by composers such as Stephen Foster and Dan Emmett. They preferred material from the minstrel shows to more serious fare, although the company did publish material such as Foster's non-blackface ballads and songs by Louis Moreau Gottschalk.

In the 1850s, demand steadily grew in the United States for guitars. Firth, Pond & Company offered the instruments under its imprint, advertising, "Guitars of Our Own Manufacture, of Superior Tone and Finish, in Lined Case, for $15 to $50". These were actually created by guitar makers such as C. F. Martin and James Ashborn. By 1855, Firth, Pond & Company sold $50,000 in pianos and $30,000 in guitars and other instruments; sheet music revenues were $70,000.

When Firth and Pond parted ways, the company split into Firth, Son & Company and William A. Pond & Company (William Adams Pond; 1824–1885). Firth, Son & Company was acquired by Oliver Ditson & Co. in 1867. William A. Pond & Company ceased in 1917; its catalog was eventually acquired by Carl Fischer Music.
