= Open Thy Lattice Love (song) =

Song
- Written: February 1, 1844
- Genre: Vocal quartet
- Songwriter: Stephen Foster

Open Thy Lattice Love was a song composed by Stephen Foster on February 1, 1844, in Pittsburgh, Pennsylvania. Susan E. Robinson was the last remaining member of the quartet that performed the song and the person who the song was written for. She died at age 85 on December 31, 1916. Other sources give a different date of publication. The song is mentioned in Chapter IX of MacKinlay Kantor's Pulitzer Prize-winning novel "Andersonville" (1955).

== Lyrics ==
Open thy lattice, love listen to me!
The cool balmy breeze is abroad on the sea!
The moon like a queen, roams her realms of blue,
And the stars keep their vigils in heaven for you
Ere morn's gushing light tips the bills with its ray,
Away o'er the waters away and away!
Then open thy lattice, love listen to me!
While the moon's in the sky and the breeze on the sea!

Open thy lattice, love listen to me!
In the voyage of life, love our pilot will be!
He will sit at the helm wherever we rove,
And steer by the load-star he kindled above
His shell for a shallop will cut the bright spray,
Or skim like a bird o'er the waters away;
Then open thy lattice, love listen to me!
While the moon's in the sky and the breeze on the sea!
