= Horace Waters =

American music publisher

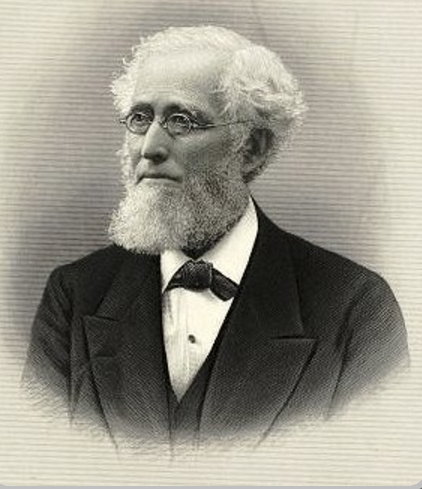
- Born: November 1, 1812
- Died: April 22, 1893 (aged 80); New York
- Resting place: Greenwood
- Occupations: Hymn book publisher, Hymn sheet music publisher, piano, player-piano, organ, melodeon manufacturer
- Years active: 1844 – 1864
- Style: Hymns
- Children: Leeds and Horace Waters Jr.

Horace Waters was a 19th-century hymn publisher and frequent collaborator with Stephen Foster and Susan McFarland Parkhurst. In 1845, he established his "Piano and Music Establishment". He was a retailer of organs, pianos, sheet music and melodeons. In the 1850s he began to manufacture his own organs and melodeons. He added his own line of pianos to his manufacturing company after the Civil War. His sons, T. Leed Waters and Horace Waters Jr became active in the company around 1864. The popularity of the melodeons and organs declined while the piano became a more common instrument in the home and so the company discontinued the manufacture of these. He also produced player pianos.

Waters was described as having strong convictions, and his life was regarded as "a living commentary upon the precepts and principles of the New Testament".

== Works ==
Publications
Publications	year	Publisher
"The Anniversary and Sunday School Music Book Nos. 1 and 2 with additions"	1858	New York: Horace Waters
"The Anniversary and Sunday School Music Book No. 1-5"	1858	New York: Horace Waters
"The Sabbath School Bell"	1859	Philadelphia, Pennsylvania: Presbyterian Board of Publication
"The Westminster Collection of Sabbath School Hymns and Tunes"	1858	New York: Horace Waters
"The Revival Music Book"	1860	New York: Horace Waters
Sabbath School Bell No. 2	1860	New York: Horace Waters
Waters' Choral Harp	1863	New York: Horace Waters
"The Athenaeum collection of hymns and tunes for church and Sunday School"	1863	New York: Horace Waters
"Choral Harp for Sunday Schools"	1865	
"Heavenly Echoes"	1867	New York: C. M. Tremaine
