= Susan Beacham =

American personal finance educator

Susan Beacham, also known as “Mrs. Money”, is an American personal finance educator specializing in financial literacy for children. Her career in banking led her to found the company Money Savvy Generation. The company develops educational toys, curriculum, and resources to teach financial education to children of all ages. Through her blog, she offers financial expertise to her readers.

== Early years ==
Susan Prester Beacham was born and raised on the south side of Chicago in 1958, where she attended Lourdes High School and later Mundelein College. There, she received her B.A. and M.B.A., and later received a J.D. from Loyola University Law School in 1984.

== Professional financial career ==
Beacham began working for the Northern Trust Company in 1979 where she held a variety of positions, including supervisor, division manager, trust officer and second vice president. She then relocated to Los Angeles, where she began working as the vice president and manager for Wells Fargo Bank. In 1990, she moved to Pasadena, where she retained her position with Wells Fargo Bank, and then moved back to Chicago in 1994. After leaving Wells Fargo in 1996, Beacham became the senior vice president and manager of Bank of America where she remained until 1999. Beacham became the founder and CEO of Money Savvy Generation with her husband, Michael Beacham, as the president.

== Media appearances ==
Beacham has appeared on television shows including Oprah and Dr. Phil to promote financial literacy. She has also appeared in newspapers Newsweek, USA Today, The New York Times, Chicago Tribune and The Wall Street Journal.

== Products ==
Inspired to teach children the significance of money decisions, Beacham created the Money Savvy Pig as a hands-on, concrete learning tool for elementary school children. Referred to as the “piggy bank of the 21st century”, the Money Savvy Pig is a four chambered piggy bank with four individual slots to “Save, Spend, Donate, and Invest”. The patented pig has been the recipient of the 2002 Parents Choice Gold Award, the 2008 NAPPA Gold Award. and a Seal of Approval from The National Parenting Center. This product serves as the icon for the company, Money Savvy Generation.

Written by Beacham and Lynnette Khalfani-Cox, the Money Savvy Kids Club is a four volume set of children's books that teaches children the importance of saving, spending, donating and investing. The plot consists of four characters, Isaiah, Sandy, Stephanie and Dennis, who go through a series of money escapades as they learn about the vast possibilities one can do with money.

Introduced in 2011, Savings Spree is an App for children created by Beacham along with App developer Carstens Studios. Savings Spree teaches children how the choices that they make each day can add up to big savings or big expenses, depending upon how they spend (or do not spend) their money. The App was awarded the 2011 Parents' Choice for mobile Apps for children ages 7–12.
