= Joseph Beecham =

British businessman and baronet

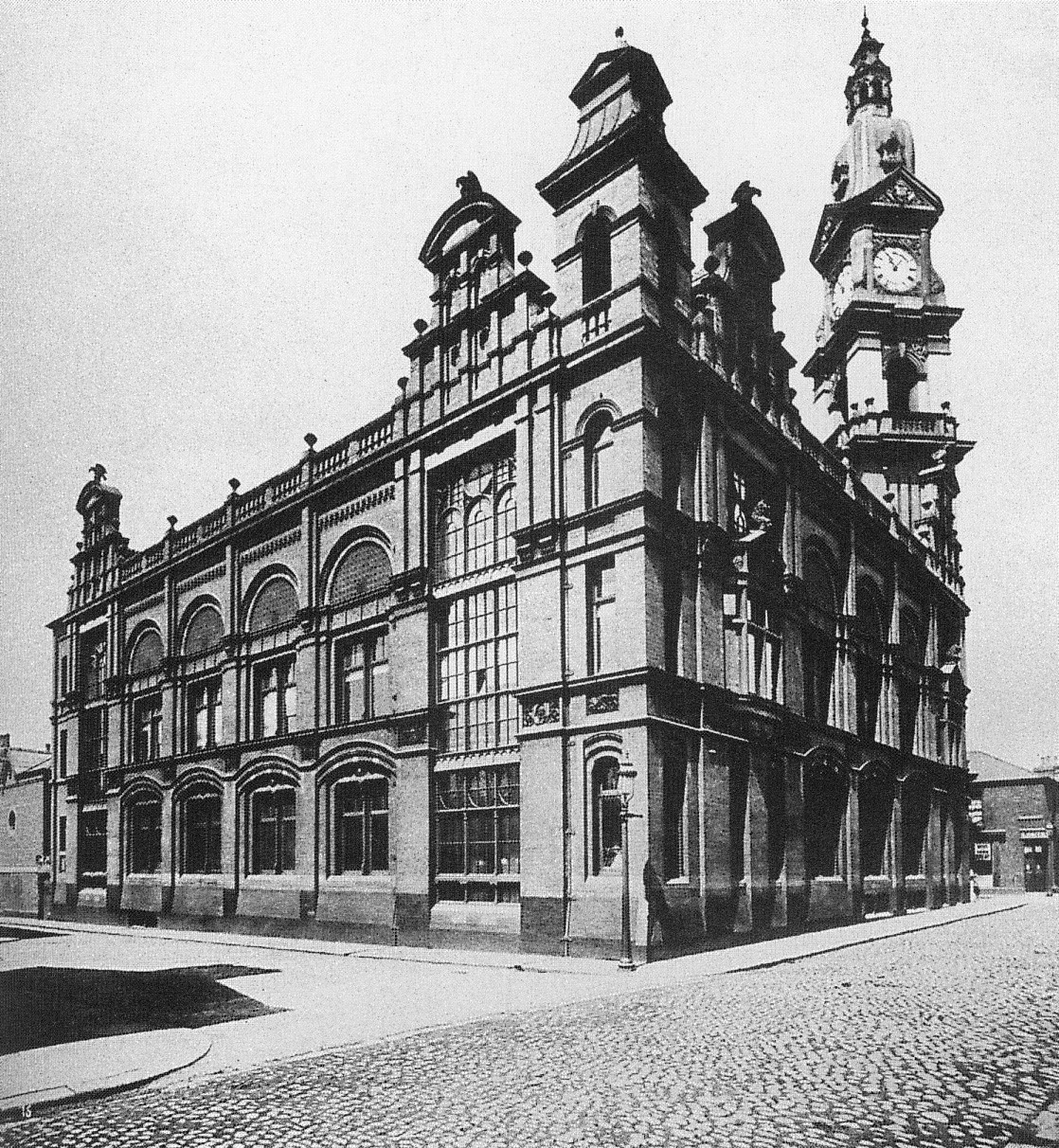
Beecham's Clock Tower built in 1877 in St Helens, Merseyside, today serving as the College Administrative centre

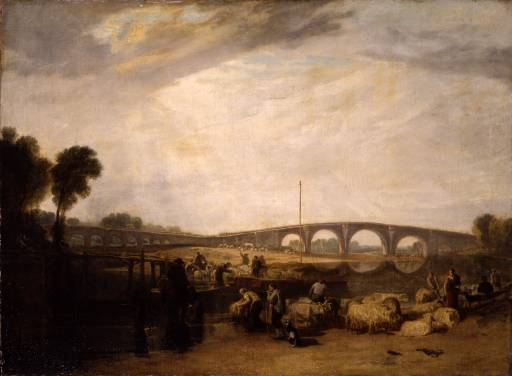
Joseph Beecham purchased the painting Walton Bridges between 1909 and 1910

Sir Joseph Beecham, 1st Baronet (8 June 1848 – 23 October 1916) was a British businessman.

Beecham was the eldest son of Thomas Beecham and Jane Evans. He played a large part in the growth and expansion of his father's medicinal pill business which he joined in 1866. He was responsible for Beechams' factory and office in Westfield Street, St. Helens, being built in 1885. A factory was subsequently opened in New York followed by more factories and agencies in several other countries. The increasing demands placed on him by his father's business meant he had to step down from his position as the parish organist of St John the Evangelist, Ravenhead.

Beecham was the proprietor of the Aldwych Theatre in London, a justice of the peace for Lancashire and was mayor of St. Helens between 1889 and 1899 and again from 1910 to 1912. He was made a baronet, of Ewanville in the Parish of Huyton in the County Palatine of Lancaster, in 1914. He was invested as a Knight of the Order of Saint Stanislaus by Tsar Nicholas II. Beecham was a patron of the arts and purchased a number of paintings by J. M. W. Turner. Beecham married Josephine Burnett in 1873.

== Death ==
Sir Joseph Beecham died on 23 October 1916, aged 68 at one of his residences in Hampstead. He was buried in St Helens Cemetery. He was succeeded in the baronetcy by his eldest son, Thomas, who had been knighted in his own right earlier in 1916 for his services to music as an orchestral conductor.

== Bibliography ==
- Barratt, Thomas J. (1912). The Annals of Hampstead. London: A. and C. Black.
- Beecham, Thomas (1959) [1943]. A Mingled Chime. London: Hutchinson. OCLC 470511334.
- Blackwood, Alan (1994). Sir Thomas Beecham : The Man and the Music. London: Ebury Press. ISBN 0091784344.
- BMA (1909). Secret Remedies: what they cost and what they contain. British Medical Association. pp. x, 175.
- Boyce, Gordon (2012). The Growth and Dissolution of a Large-scale Business Enterprise: The Furness Interest 1892–1919. Research in Maritime History, 49. International Maritime Economic History Association. Oxford University Press. ISBN 9780986497391. ISSN 1188-3928.
- Bulgaria of To-Day. London: Bulgarian Ministry of Commerce and Agriculture. 1907.
- Chamier, J. Daniel (1938). Percy Pitt of Covent Garden and the BBC. London: Edwin Arnold & Co.
- Chevrillon, André (1897). Romantic India. Translated by William Marchant. London: William Heinemann.
- Corley, T. A. B. (1988). Hausman, William J. (ed.). "Competition and the Growth of Advertising in the U.S. and Britain, 1800–1914". Business and Economic History. 17. Cambridge University. JSTOR 23702968.
- Corley, T.A.B. (1994). "The Beecham Group in the World's Pharmaceutical Industry 1914–70". Zeitschrift für Unternehmensgeschichte / Journal of Business History. 39 (H. 1.). Verlag C.H.Beck. JSTOR 40695463.
- Corley, T. A. B. (2004). "Beecham, Thomas (1820–1907)". Oxford Dictionary of National Biography (online ed.). Oxford University Press. doi:10.1093/ref:odnb/30669. (Subscription, Wikipedia Library access or UK public library membership required.)
- Corley, Tony (2010). "Beecham: a family firm 1859–1924". In Quirke, Viviane; Slinn, Judy (eds.). Perspectives on Twentieth-century Pharmaceuticals. Peter Lang. ISBN 9783039109203.
- Cragoe, Matthew; Readman, Paul (2010). "Introduction". The Land Question in Britain, 1750–1950. Palgrave Macmillan. ISBN 9780230203402.
- Hammerton, John Alexander, ed. (1916). "More Men Who Have Won Heroic Fame". The Second Winter Campaign 1915–16. The War Illustrated Album de luxe; the story of the great European war told by camera, pen and pencil. Vol. V. London: The Amalgamated Press.
- Hanham, H. J. (March 1960). "The Sale of Honours in Late Victorian England". Victorian Studies. 3 (3). Indiana University Press. JSTOR 3825500.
- Jefferson, Alan (1979). A Centenary Tribute: Sir Thomas Beecham. London: World Records, by arrangement with Macdonald and Jane's Publishers. ISBN 035404205X.
- Johnston, Thomas (1934). Financiers and the Nation. London: Methuen and Co.
- Lucas, John (2008). Thomas Beecham: An Obsession with Music. Boydell & Brewer. ISBN 9781843834021.
- Quinault, Roland (2010). "London and the Land Question, c. 1880–1914". In Cragoe, Matthew; Readman, Paul (eds.). The Land Question in Britain, 1750–1950. Palgrave Macmillan. ISBN 9780230203402.
- Reid, Charles (1961). Thomas Beecham: An Independent Biography. London: Victor Gollancz. OCLC 500565141.
- Reynolds, Paige (Summer 2000). "'Chaos Invading Concept': Blast as a Native Theory of Promotional Culture". Twentieth Century Literature. 46 (2). Duke University Press. doi:10.2307/441959. JSTOR 441959.
- Rodmell, Paul (2016). Opera in the British Isles, 1875–1918. Music in Nineteenth-Century Britain. London: Routledge. ISBN 9781317085454.
- Simpson, A. W. B. (June 1985). "Quackery and Contract Law: The Case of the Carbolic Smoke Ball". The Journal of Legal Studies. 14 (2). The University of Chicago Press for The University of Chicago Law School: 381. JSTOR 724433.
- Suonpää, Mika (July 2008). British Perception of Balkan Slavs : Professional and Popular Categorisations before 1914 (D. Phil). University of Hull.
- Suonpää, Mika (March 2012). "Financial Speculation, Political Risks, and Legal Complications: British Commercial Diplomacy in the Balkans, c. 1906–1914". The Historical Journal. 55 (1). Cambridge University Press. JSTOR 41349647.
- Wilkins, Mira (1989). The History of Foreign Investment in the United States to 1914. Harvard Studies in Business History, Issue 41. Harvard University Press. ISBN 9780674396661.
- Yamey, B. S. (September 1952). "The Origins of Resale Price Maintenance: A Study of Three Branches of Retail Trade". The Economic Journal. 62 (247). doi:10.2307/2226898. JSTOR 2226898.

Baronetage of the United Kingdom
New creation	Baronet (of Ewanville); 1914–1916	Succeeded by Thomas Beecham
