= Joseph Beacham =

United States Army general

Biographical details
- Born: April 8, 1874; Brooklyn, New York, U.S.
- Died: July 28, 1958 (aged 84); Washington, D.C., U.S.
- Education: Cornell University

Playing career

Football
- 1893–1896: Cornell
- Position: End

Coaching career (HC unless noted)

Football
- 1911: Army

Head coaching record
- Overall: 11–4–2

Joseph William Beacham (April 8, 1874 – July 28, 1958) was an American football player, coach and retired United States Army brigadier general. He served as the head football coach at the United States Military Academy in 1911, compiling a career college football record of 6–1–1.

== Biography ==
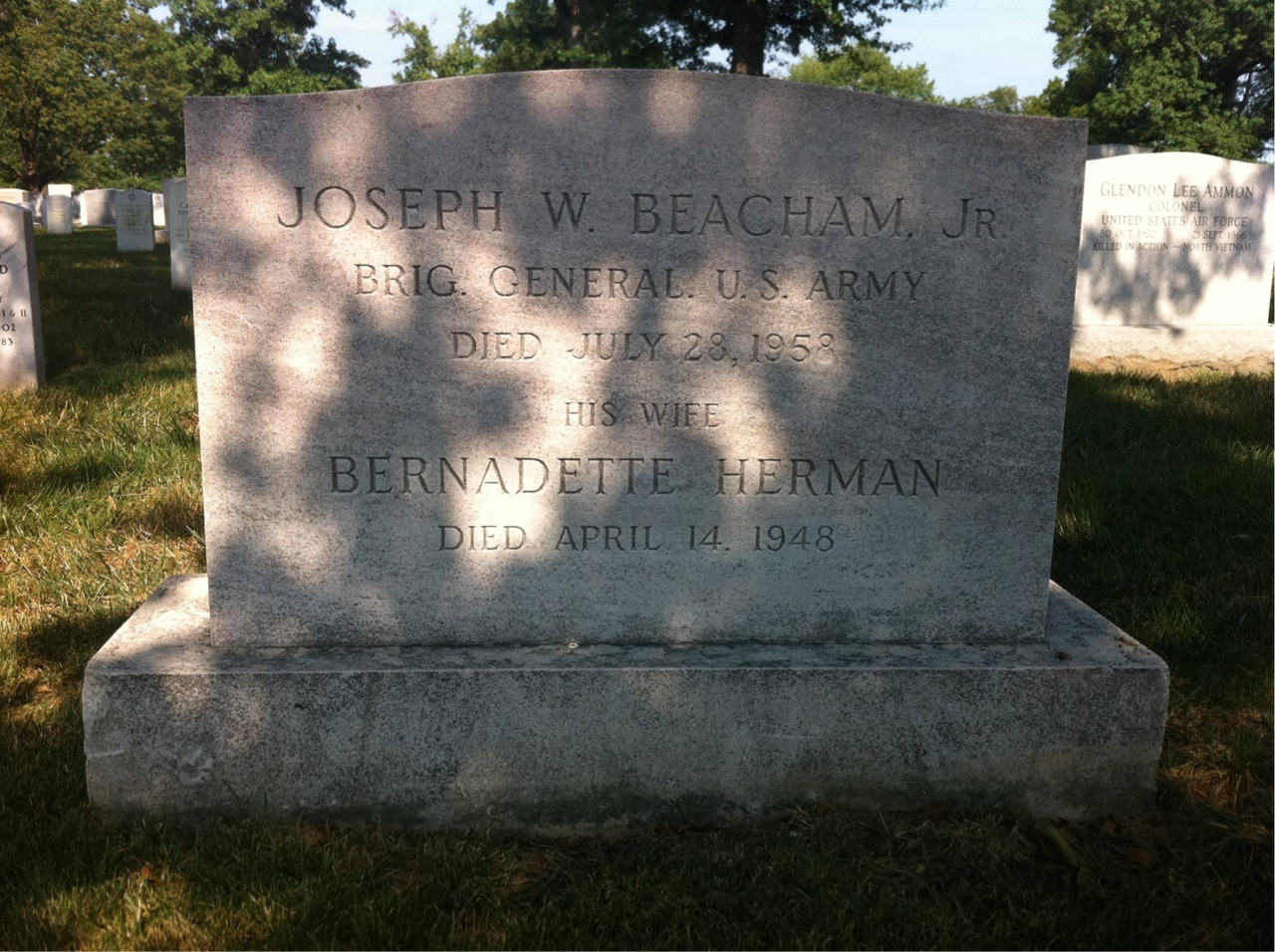
Grave at Arlington National Cemetery

Beacham was born on April 8, 1874. He graduated from Cornell University in 1897. A brigadier general in the United States Army, Beacham was Professor of Military Science and Tactics at Cornell University and head of the military units at Cornell from 1926 to 1932.

While at Cornell, Beacham was head of the 100-member music band. In 1927, Beacham ordered new red uniforms for the band, which included white belts and black and gold helmets, which replaced the previous "not quite white" uniforms. The $2,500 cost of the uniforms was covered by holding a formal ball at Barton Hall.

Beacham died at Walter Reed General Hospital in Washington, D.C., on July 28, 1958. He was buried at Arlington National Cemetery.

== Head coaching record ==
Year	Team	Overall	Conference	Standing	Bowl/playoffs
Army Cadets (Independent) (1911)
1911	Army	6–1–1			
Army:		6–1–1			
Total:		11–4–2			
