= Beecham baronets =

Baronetcy in the Baronetage of the United Kingdom

- Escutcheon of the Beecham Baronets of Ewanville
- Creation date: 1914
- Status: dormant
- Motto: Nil sine labore, Nothing without labour

The Beecham Baronetcy, of Ewanville in the Parish of Huyton in the County Palatine of Lancaster, is a title in the Baronetage of the United Kingdom. It was created on 17 July 1914 for the Lancashire pill manufacturer Joseph Beecham. Joseph was succeeded by his eldest son, Thomas, a conductor who founded the London Philharmonic Orchestra in 1932.

The 4th and 5th Baronets were absent from the Official Roll and, As of 2023, the title is considered dormant.

== Beecham baronets, of Ewanville (1914) ==
- Sir Joseph Beecham, 1st Baronet (1848–1916)
- Sir Thomas Beecham, 2nd Baronet (1879–1961)
- Sir Adrian Welles Beecham, 3rd Baronet (1904–1982)
- John Stratford Roland Beecham, presumed 4th Baronet (1940–2011), succeeded his father, the 3rd Baronet, but never appeared on the Official Roll as the 4th Baronet
- Robert Adrian Beecham (born 1942), succeeded his brother, the 4th Baronet, but has not appeared on the Official Roll as the 5th Baronet

The heir apparent is the present holder's son, Michael John Beecham (born 1972).
