= John Beecham =

English Wesleyan writer

John Beecham (1787 – 22 April 1856) was an English Wesleyan writer.

== Biography ==
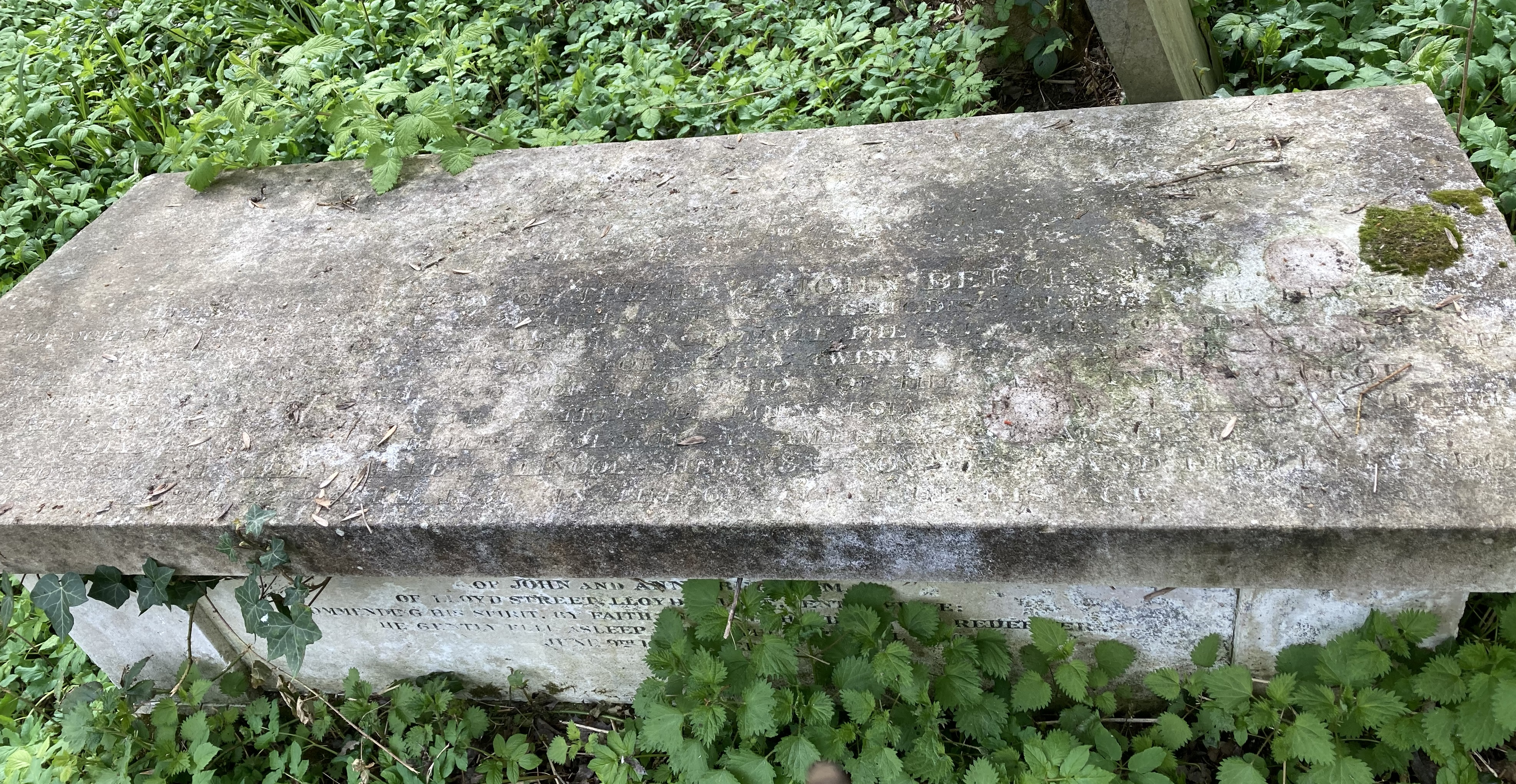
Grave of John Beecham in Highgate Cemetery

He was born at Barnoldby-le-Beck, near Great Grimsby, Lincolnshire, in 1787. His father died at Waltham while he was a child. He was educated privately under a clergyman, the incumbent of the neighbouring parish of Irby. His friends desired him to become a clergyman in the established church. Young Beecham, however, preferred to join the Methodists. After a short period of preparation he became, in 1815, an itinerant preacher in the Wesleyan community, and soon reached a position of influence. He showed a thorough mastery of the principles of Wesleyan Methodism in his 'Essay on the Constitution of Wesleyan Methodism,' and in his writings and speeches on the work of missions. He was appointed in 1831 to the office of general secretary of the Wesleyan Missionary Society, and displayed great ability in administering its affairs at the mission house, in counselling its agents all over the world, and in advocating its claims. In 1850 he was elected to the presidency of the Wesleyan conference, and fulfilled the duties of that onerous position in a time of great anxiety and trouble with dignity and grace. Dr. Beecham's later years were largely occupied in the formation of new Methodist conferences in North America and in Australia.

His wife died in 1853. Their family consisted of one son and two daughters. He died in London 22 April 1856, aged 68 and is buried in the dissenters section on the west side of Highgate Cemetery.

The following are his principal literary works: 1. 'An Essay on the Constitution of Wesleyan Methodism,' 3rd edition, London, 1851. 2. 'Ashantee and the Gold Coast; a Sketch of the History of those Countries,' London, 1841. 3. 'Colonisation,' London, 1838.
