= Miller & Beacham =

The music publishing firm of Miller & Beacham was formed by William Miller and Joseph R. Beacham in 1853 in Baltimore, Maryland. In 1862, they purchased the Baltimore firm of John Cole. Miller had previously purchased the firm of F. D. Benteen in 1838. Miller & Beacham was one of the most popular publishers during the American Civil War, and their catalogue included "Maryland! My Maryland!".
