= Transgender rights in Germany =

Rights of transgender people living in Germany

Transgender rights in Germany vary depending on the specific area. Since the Self-Determination Act came into effect in 2024, it has been possible to change one’s legal gender and first name without the need for a psychological evaluation or court proceedings.

However, psychotherapy and an evaluation by the medical service are still required for gender-affirming care if these are to be covered by statutory health insurance. Since a 2023 ruling by the Federal Social Court determined that gender-affirming procedures for treating psychological distress caused by gender incongruence are a new method of examination and treatment that must be assessed by the Federal Joint Committee before being covered by statutory health insurance, access to care has worsened.

Protection against discrimination on the basis of gender identity is regulated differently across Germany; however, discrimination in the areas of employment and the provision of goods and services is generally prohibited nationwide under the General Equal Treatment Act, which, among other things, implements the European Union’s Equal Treatment Directive.

== Historical law ==
=== Transsexuals Act ===
In 1980, West Germany passed a law regulating the change of first names and legal gender, the Transsexuals Act. Since 1990, following the reunification of East and West Germany, it used to apply to all of Germany.

To change either name or gender, two independent medical court experts had to be commissioned by the judge. They were asked to evaluate whether

- the person "does not identify with the birth-assigned sex/gender, (Note: The German word Geschlecht (the terminology used in the law) can be translated as either "sex" or "gender".) but with the other one", and
- "feels a compulsion to live according to his/her ideas for at least three years", and
- it is to be assumed with high probability, that the feeling of belonging to the other sex/gender is not going to change".

==== Constitutional challenges ====
During its lifetime, the TSG had been found unconstitutional on a variety of grounds by the Federal Constitutional Court since its inception. In 1982, the requirement that a candidate be 25 years of age was found in violation of the equality clause of the German Constitution (Art. 3). In 2006, the court ordered lawmakers to amend the law so that the TSG would apply for non-Germans who have legal residency status in Germany, as long as their country of citizenship does not have equivalent laws. In 2008, the court declared that the requirement that a candidate be unmarried was unconstitutional. In January 2011, the court declared the criteria for gender change requiring gender-affirming surgery and sterilization or infertility unconstitutional.

== Current law ==
=== Self-Determination Act ===
Germany's 2021-2025 ruling coalition committed to removing the TSG and replacing it with gender self-identification. For this purpose, it drafted the Self-Determination Act, publishing a ministry-level draft bill in May 2023.

The law was voted upon in the Bundestag on 12 April 2024. It was adopted with 372 votes in favour, 251 against, 11 abstentions and 100 absent. On 17 May 2024 the Bundesrat voted against raising objections to the law, thereby passing it in practice, and finishing the legislative process. The law went into effect on 1 November 2024.

==== Procedure ====
The Self-Determination Act sets out the following:

- Self-identification for adults to change the gender entry and first name(s) in the civil registry.
- The same for 14 to 17 year-olds with the consent of their parents or guardians.
- If the parents or guardians do not consent, a Family court can replace the decision of the parents or guardians.
- For children under 14, a change can be done via a declaration of the parents or guardians (the child must be present during the declaration).
- Minors or, in the case of children under 14, their guardians must declare that they have received counseling.
- Changes are done by the civil registration office Standesamt.
- Ahead of a change, a person must register three months beforehand.
- After a change, the gender and name cannot be changed for 1 year.

=== Act to Protect against Conversion Treatments ===
In 2020, the Act to Protect against Conversion Treatments came into effect. It makes conversion therapy – aimed at changing the sexual orientation or gender identity of minors and adults who have not given their effective consent – a criminal offense. Publicly advertising, offering, or arranging conversion therapy is punishable as an administrative offense.

The Federal Institute of Public Health (BIÖG) has been tasked with providing free, anonymous counselling. Counselling is available via telephone and online for individuals affected by conversion therapy, their family members, and members of the public grappling with issues of sexual orientation and gender identity.

== Healthcare ==
In Germany, there are no laws governing gender-affirming care in the medical sense. The right to coverage by statutory health insurance was established by the Federal Social Court in 1987. However, the court viewed gender-affirming care only as a last resort and only if psychiatric and psychological interventions had failed to provide relief. If gender-affirming care is to be covered by the statutory health insurance, psychotherapy and the submission of expert opinions from the Medical Service based on an ICD-10 diagnosis of "Transsexualism" are currently required. Non-binary people are not covered by this and cannot claim gender-affirming care. This practice has long been criticized by German medical associations, as the diagnostic label of "Transsexualism" is considered outdated, and the associated psychological evaluations – which serve as a form of gatekeeping – are also viewed as outdated and harmful.

In 2023, the Federal Social Court issued a landmark ruling overturning its 1987 ruling on gender-affirming care and all subsequent rulings on the matter. In response to a lawsuit filed by a non-binary person, the court determined that, due to scientific progress and the recent case law from the Federal Constitutional Court regarding civil status law, the old case law regarding the outdated diagnosis of "Transsexualism" is no longer tenable. While a claim for gender-affirming care based on psychological distress due to gender incongruence is, in principle, possible, these individual measures must be assessed by the Federal Joint Committee in the method evaluation process so that they can be covered by statutory health insurance. Until then, according to the court, there is no entitlement to gender-affirming care. For gender-affirming care already in progress at the time of the ruling, entitlement continues to exist under the protection against retroactive legislation provided by the Basic Law for the Federal Republic of Germany.

Regardless of statutory health insurance coverage, the Association of the Scientific Medical Societies in Germany's medical guidelines set out medical standards regarding transgender issues and gender affirmative care. These guidelines call for the depathologization of transgender people and the establishment of medical gender transition steps through shared decision-making. The AWMF guidelines are considered the gold standard in medicine throughout Germany.

== Parenthood ==
=== Gender-neutral names ===
In the past, German law required parents to give their child a gender-specific name. This is no longer true, since the Federal Constitutional Court held in 2008 that there is no obligation that a name has to be gender-specific, even if it is the only one.

=== Parental identification on children's birth certificates ===
While the legal gender for trans people can be changed through the Self-Determination Act, they will still be forcibly misgendered as biological parents on their children's birth registers with a reference to their old gender (e.g. a trans woman as "father"), with no option to change that. However, under the Self-Determination Act, it is now possible to list the parent as "parent" on the birth certificate instead of "father" or "mother". This change cannot be made in the birth registry, which provides the basis for issuing birth certificates.

== Third gender ==
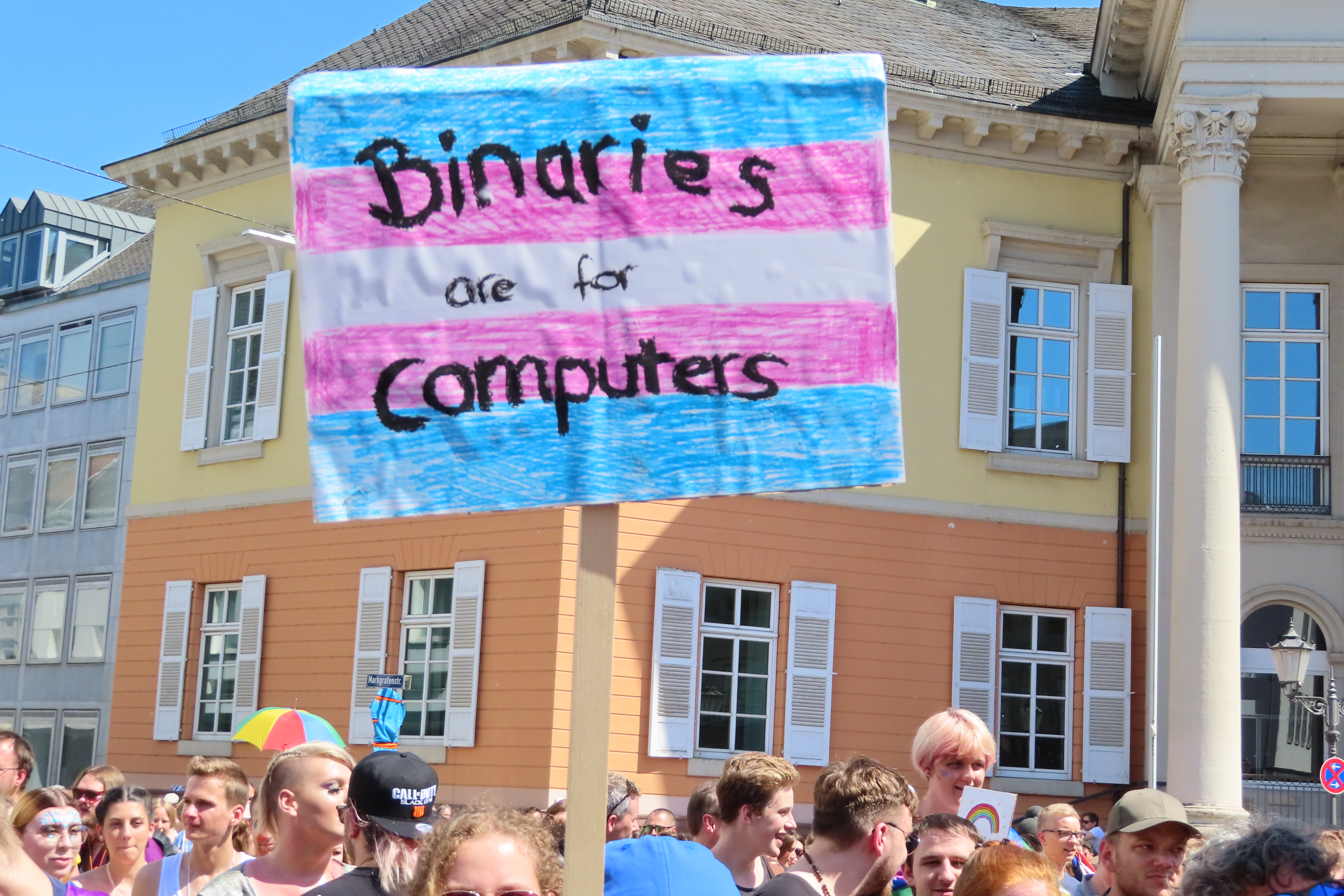
A protester advocating for LGBTQ rights in Karlsruhe holds a sign that reads "Binaries are for computers".

In November 2017, the German Federal Constitutional Court ruled that civil status law must allow a third gender option. This means that birth registers no longer need to have blank gender entries for intersex people. The ruling was implemented through the Third Gender Act. The Self-Determination Act completely revised the Third Gender Act provisions and standardised the regulations for trans, inter and non-binary people in a single law.

== Discrimination protections ==
The General Equal Treatment Act came into force on 18 August 2006. It bans discrimination based on sexual orientation, gender identity and sex characteristics in employment and the provision of goods and services.

Hate speech on the basis of sexual orientation and gender identity is not banned nationwide in Germany. Some states have laws banning all forms of discrimination in their constitutions (Berlin, Brandenburg, Bremen, Saarland and Thuringia). In those states, hate speech based on both sexual orientation and gender identity is prohibited.

== Politicians ==
In September 2021, Nyke Slawik and Tessa Ganserer, members of the Green Party, were elected to the Bundestag. They are openly transgender women. Later that year, the government pledged to loosen restrictions on legal name changes and to compensate transgender people who were sterilized against their will.

Michaela Lindner was one of the first out transgender politicians in Germany.

== See also ==
- LGBTQ rights in Germany
- Legal status of transgender people
- Transvestite pass (issued to trans and crossdressing people in Weimar Germany by Magnus Hirschfeld)
- Dora Richter (the first trans woman recorded to receive Gender-affirming surgery)
