= Timeline of LGBTQ history in Germany =

This is a list of events in Lesbian, Gay, Bisexual, Transgender and Queer (LGBTQ) history in Germany.

== Ancient ==
- 98 – Germanic tribes executing homosexuals are reported by Tacitus. The remains of such corpses have been found in Denmark and Northern Germany.

== Medieval and early modern periods ==
- c. 800 – Several laws against homosexual acts are put into effect in the Holy Roman Empire by the Frankish king Charlemagne.
- 1007 – The Decretum of Burchard of Worms equates homosexual acts with other sexual transgressions such as adultery and argues, therefore, that it should have the same penance (generally fasting).

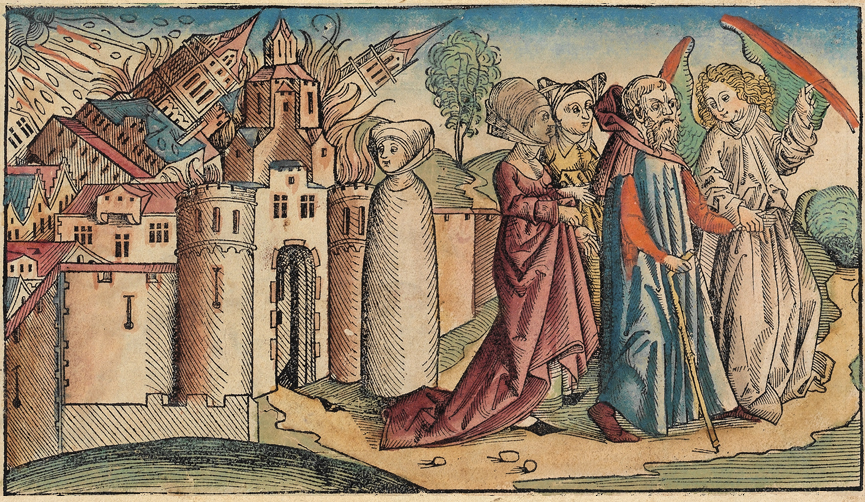
"Sodom and Gomorrah" from the Nuremberg Chronicle by Hartmann Schedel, 1493

- 1328 – The German Law Book for Town and Country calls for lesbians and gay men to be burned at the stake. In practice, decapitation by sword was more common.
- 1493 – Hartmann Schedel illustrates Sodom and Gomorrah in Nuremberg Chronicle. The Book of Genesis 18 and 19 describes the destruction of Sodom as punishment for homosexuality.
- 1532 – The Holy Roman Empire makes sodomy punishable by death.

== 17th century ==
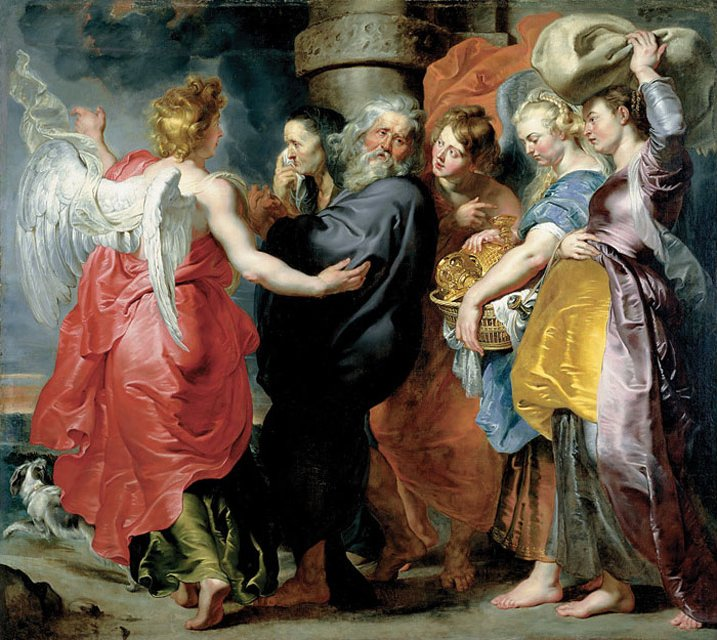
The Flight of Lot and His Family from-Sodom by Peter Paul Rubens, 1613-15

- 1615 – Peter Paul Rubens paints The Flight of Lot and his Family from Sodom.
- 1620 – Brandenburg-Prussia criminalizes sodomy, making it punishable by death.

== 18th century ==
- 1721 – Catharina Margaretha Linck is the last woman executed for female sodomy in what is Germany today.
- 1746 – Frederick the Great of the Kingdom of Prussia suspends use of the death penalty for sodomy.
- 1794 – The Kingdom of Prussia officially abolishes the death penalty for sodomy. Long prison sentences with hard labour replace death as the punishment for homosexuality.

== 19th century ==
- 1852 – Johann Ludwig Casper writes an article about homosexuality, known as Über Nothzucht und Päderastie und deren Ermittlung Seitens des Gerichtsarztes.
- 1854 – Wilhelm Gollmann writes about homosexuality in the Homeopathic Guide to all Diseases Urinary and Sexual Organs.
- 1859 – Arthur Schopenhauer briefly writes about homosexuality in the chapter on the Metaphysics of Love in his third edition of The World as Will and Representation.
- 1864 – Lawyer Karl Heinrich Ulrichs confesses, under the pseudonym Numa Numantius, his secret homosexual inclinations in his first two books in the 12 book series entitled Forschungen über das Räthsel der mannmännlichen Liebe (Researches on the Riddle of Male–Male Love). He proposes a concept of third gender identity through the term Urning.
- 1864 – Johann Ludwig Casper dedicated his third chapter to homosexuality in the first part of the Special Divisions section in the third edition (third volume) of A Handbook of the Practice of Forensic Medicine.
- 1867 – On August 29, 1867, Karl Heinrich Ulrichs became the first self-proclaimed homosexual to speak out publicly for homosexual rights, when he pleaded at the Congress of German Jurists in Munich for a resolution urging the repeal of anti-homosexual laws.
- 1869 – The term homosexuality appears in print for the first time in a German-Hungarian pamphlet written by Karl-Maria Kertbeny (1824–1882).
- 1870 – Friedrich Christian Oppenhoff mentions Paragraph 175 in Das Strafgesetzbuch für den Norddeutschen Bund.
- 1871 – Homosexuality is criminalized throughout the German Empire by Paragraph 175 of the Reich Criminal Code. Homosexuality was already a criminal offence in all territories of Germany, but it was regulated by the state authorities separately.
- 1896 – The first worldwide gay magazine, Der Eigene, is founded in Berlin by Adolf Brand.
- 1897 – Founding of the Scientific-Humanitarian Committee. The first gay rights movement in history.

== 20th century ==
=== 1901–1930 ===
- 1903 - The advocacy organisation Gemeinschaft der Eigenen was founded in Berlin.
- 1906 – Brazilian countess Dina Alma de Paradeda poisons herself in Breslau, and a doctor reveals that her body was male, causing a media sensation. De Paradeda becomes one of the first transgender women known by name in the entirety of central Europe. Her history is later often recalled by Magnus Hirschfeld in his research and works.
- 1907 – Adolf Brand, the activist leader of the Gemeinschaft der Eigenen working to overturn Paragraph 175, publishes a piece "outing" the Imperial Chancellor of Germany, Prince Bernhard von Bülow. The Prince sues Brand for libel; Brand is sentenced to 18 months in prison.
- 1907–1909 – Harden-Eulenburg Affair in Germany
- 1919 – In Berlin, Doctor Magnus Hirschfeld co-founds the Institut für Sexualwissenschaft ('Institute for Sexual Science'), a pioneering private research institute and counseling office. Its library of thousands of books was destroyed by Nazis in May 1933.
- 1919 – Different from the Others (German: Anders als die Andern), one of the first explicitly gay films, is released. Magnus Hirschfeld has a cameo in the film and partially funded its production.
- 1919 - In August, gay magazine Die Freundschaft is started by publisher Karl Schulz in Berlin.
- 1919 – The Bund für Menschenrecht (BfM), a gay rights organisation, is founded in Berlin under the name Deutscher Freundschaftsverband (DFV).
- 1920 – Courts in Berlin and Leipzig judge the collection of short stories about sexually charged encounters between men authored by Granand indecent and order all copies destroyed.
- 1922 – Dora Richter becomes the first transgender woman to undergo gender reassignment surgery in Hirschfeld's Institute, the first operation of its kind in the world.
- 1924 - The first worldwide lesbian magazine, Die Freundin, is founded in Berlin.
- 1929 – On October 16, a Reichstag Committee votes to repeal Paragraph 175. The Social Democrats and other leftist parties backed the repeal, while the Catholic Center party and other right-wing parties opposed the repeal. The Nazis' rise to power prevents the implementation of the vote.

=== Nazi Germany and occupied Europe (1931–1945) ===
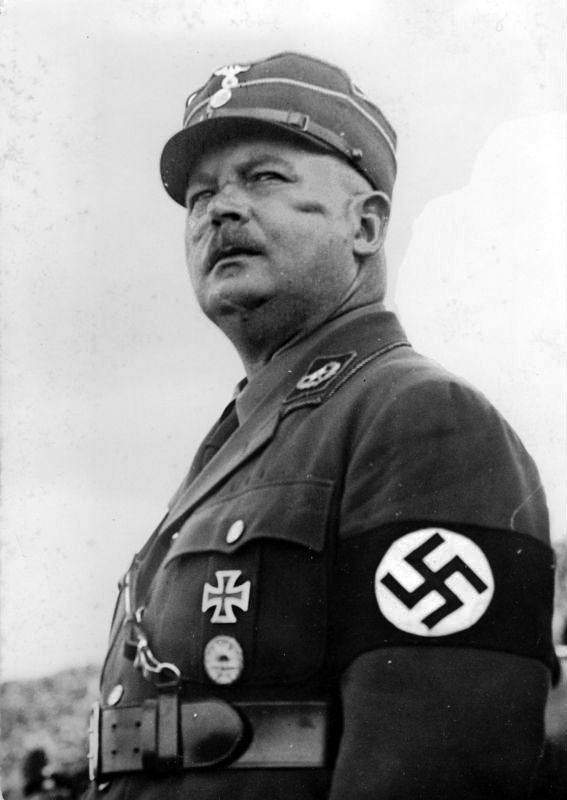
Ernst Röhm in 1933.

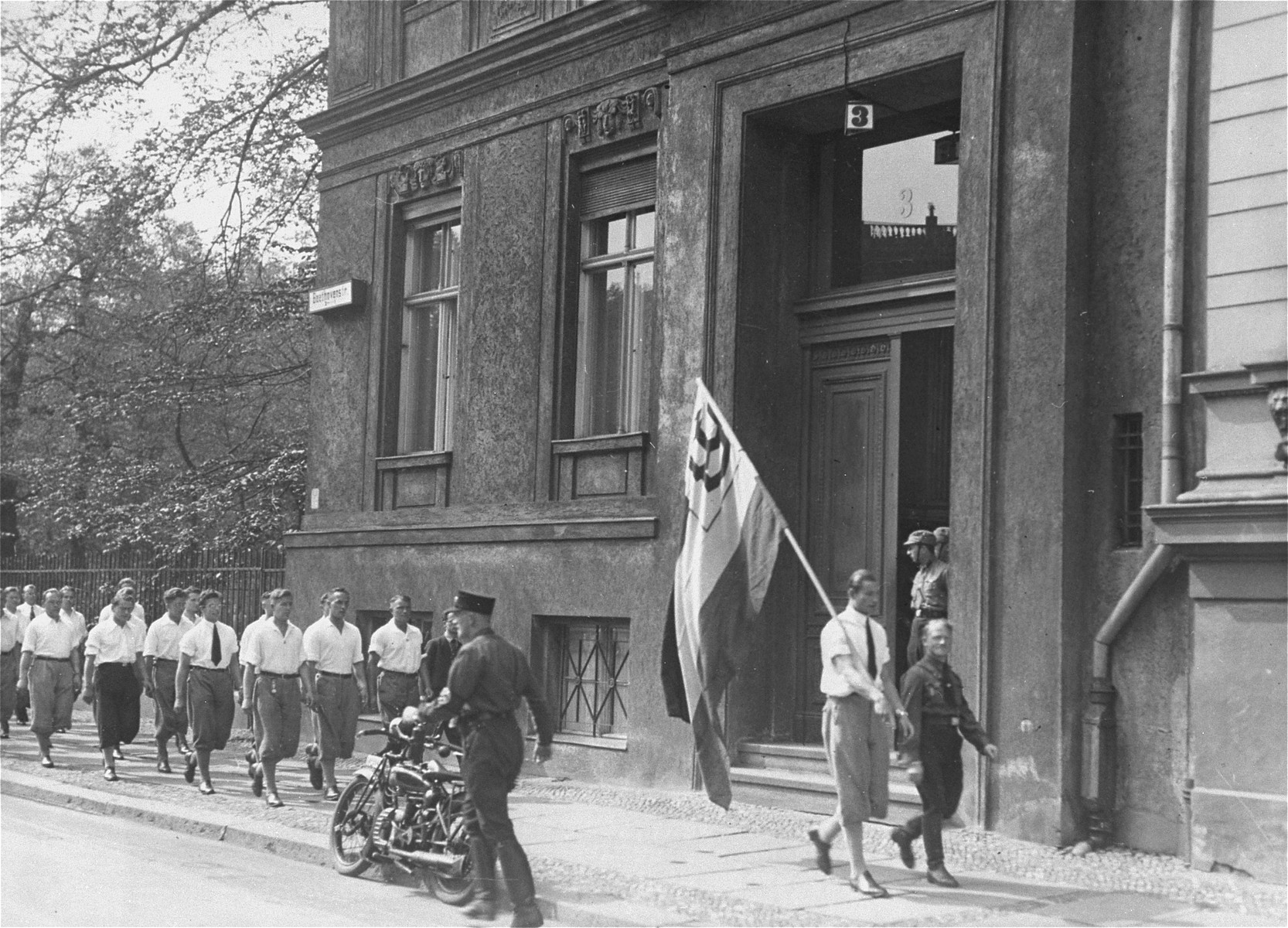
Students of the Deutsche Studentenschaft, organized by the Nazi party, parade in front of the Institut für Sexualwissenschaft in Berlin on 6 May 1933; they later attacked it, looting the archives, and torched much of the material.

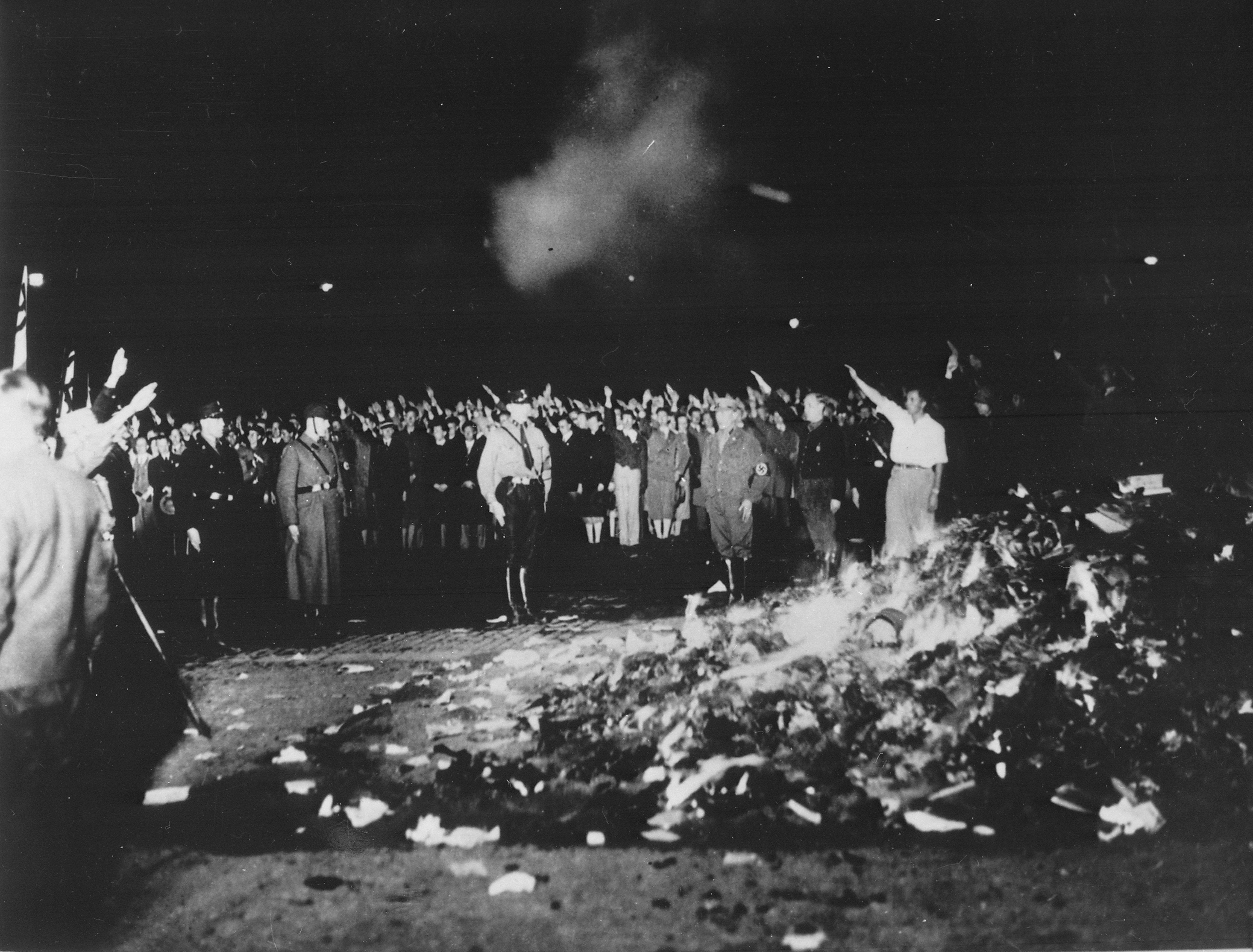
Nazi Party members at the 11 May 1933, burning of Institut für Sexualwissenschaft books at Opernplatz in Berlin

- 1931 – Mädchen in Uniform, one of the first explicitly lesbian films and the first pro-lesbian film, is released.
- 1932 – Reichstag member Ernst Röhm, from the Nazi Party, becomes the first openly gay modern politician after being outed by the centre-left Social Democratic Party and other opponents.
- 1933

– The Nazi Party bans homosexual groups.
– Homosexuals are sent to concentration camps.
– Nazi Sturmabteilung (SA), still officially led by Ernst Röhm, raids the Institut für Sexualwissenschaft, burning its library and destroying the Institute.

- 1934 – The Nazi Party killed several prominent members of their Sturmabteilung militant wing during the Night of the Long Knives. Some of the victims were known or rumoured to be gay or bisexual, including Stabschef Ernst Röhm, and his deputy Edmund Heines.
- 1937 – The first use of the pink triangle for gay men in Nazi concentration camp badges.
- 1945 – Upon the liberation of Nazi concentration camps by Allied forces, those interned for homosexuality are not freed, but required to serve out the full term of their sentences under Paragraph 175

=== Divided Germany (1945–1990) ===
- 1950 – East Germany removes the Nazis' emendations to Paragraph 175.
- 1951 – Die Freunde, a homophile magazine, is published by Johannes Dörrast in West Germany. In 1952, it is renamed Freond, and its content is edited to avoid local censorship. This was unsuccessful, and the magazine was no longer viable by 1952.
- 1968 – Paragraph 175 is abolished in East Germany, decriminalizing homosexual acts over the age of 18.
- 1969 – Paragraph 175 is eased in West Germany.
- 1974 – General Gay Association, the second openly LGBTQ rights organization in German history, is established.
- 1980 – Transsexuals Act passed in West Germany, allowing legal recognition of gender change with the approval of 2 independent medical court experts
- 1985 – Herbert Rusche becomes the first openly gay member of the West German Bundestag.
- 1987 – Jutta Oesterle-Schwerin becomes the first openly lesbian member of the West German Bundestag.

=== Reunified Germany (1991–2000) ===
- 1994 – After German reunification, the Supreme Court rules that the age of consent for sex must be equalized, although its unclear what part of the Constitution the court based its ruling on.
- 1994 - On June 11, Germany deletes Paragraph 175, which had made sexual acts between men a punishable crime.
- 2000 – The Bundestag officially apologizes to gays and lesbians persecuted under the Nazi regime, and for "harm done to homosexual citizens up to 1969".

== 21st century ==
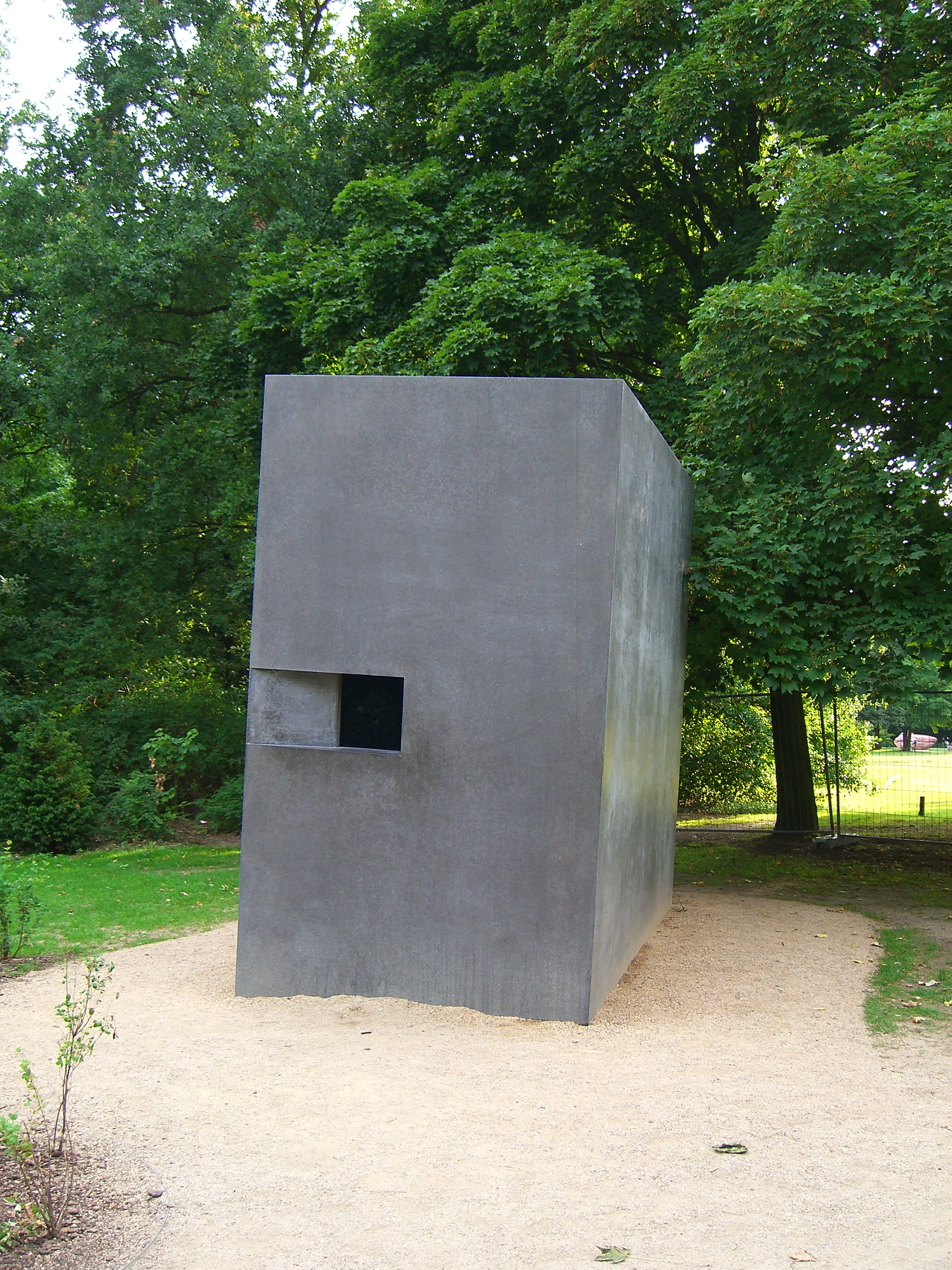
Memorial to Homosexuals Persecuted Under Nazism in Berlin's Tiergarten

- 2001 – Germany recognizes civil partnerships for same-sex couples (without joint adoption until Oct 2004, then with step-adoption); Klaus Wowereit becomes the first openly gay politician elected mayor of Berlin (and, by virtue of Berlin's status as a state, one of the two first openly gay premier of a German state; also makes Berlin the largest city in the world with an openly gay mayor); Ole von Beust becomes the first openly gay mayor of Hamburg.
- 2004 – Same-sex stepchild adoption is legalized; Guido Westerwelle, leader of the FDP, becomes the first leader of a major party to come out.
- 2008 – On May 27, the Memorial to Homosexuals Persecuted Under Nazism is handed over to the public in Berlin.
- 2009 – Westerwelle becomes the first openly gay member of the Federal Cabinet (Vice Chancellor and Foreign Minister under Angela Merkel's coalition government).
- 2013 – Barbara Hendricks becomes the first openly lesbian member of the Federal Cabinet (Federal Minister for the Environment, Nature Conservation and Nuclear Safety under Angela Merkel's coalition government)
- 2017 – In June 2017, the pardoning of men convicted in the postwar era under Paragraph 175 was passed by law in the Bundestag. One week later, a majority of Bundestag MPs voted in favor of a bill legalizing same-sex marriage in Germany and granting homosexual couples full adoption rights.
- 2018 – Third Gender Act is passed, allowing people to register their gender as diverse (German: divers) as an alternative to female or male, intended solely for intersex people and requiring medical certification of "a variant of sex development"
- 2020 – The Federal Court of Justice rules that the Third Gender Act is not available for non-binary people who are not intersex.
- 2019 – Conversion therapy is completely banned for minors and partially banned for adults in December 2019.
- 2021 – In May, a bill passes in the Bundestag that provides compensation to LGBTQ servicepeople in the military for past discrimination and harassment.
- 2024 – The new Self-Determination Act replaces the 1980 Transsexuals Act and amends the 2019 Third Gender Act, making it easier for trans, intersex and non-binary people to change their gender and first name in the civil status register.

== See also ==
- LGBTQ rights in Germany
- Violence against LGBTQ people
- Homophobia
- Transphobia
