= Nicole Höchst =

German politician

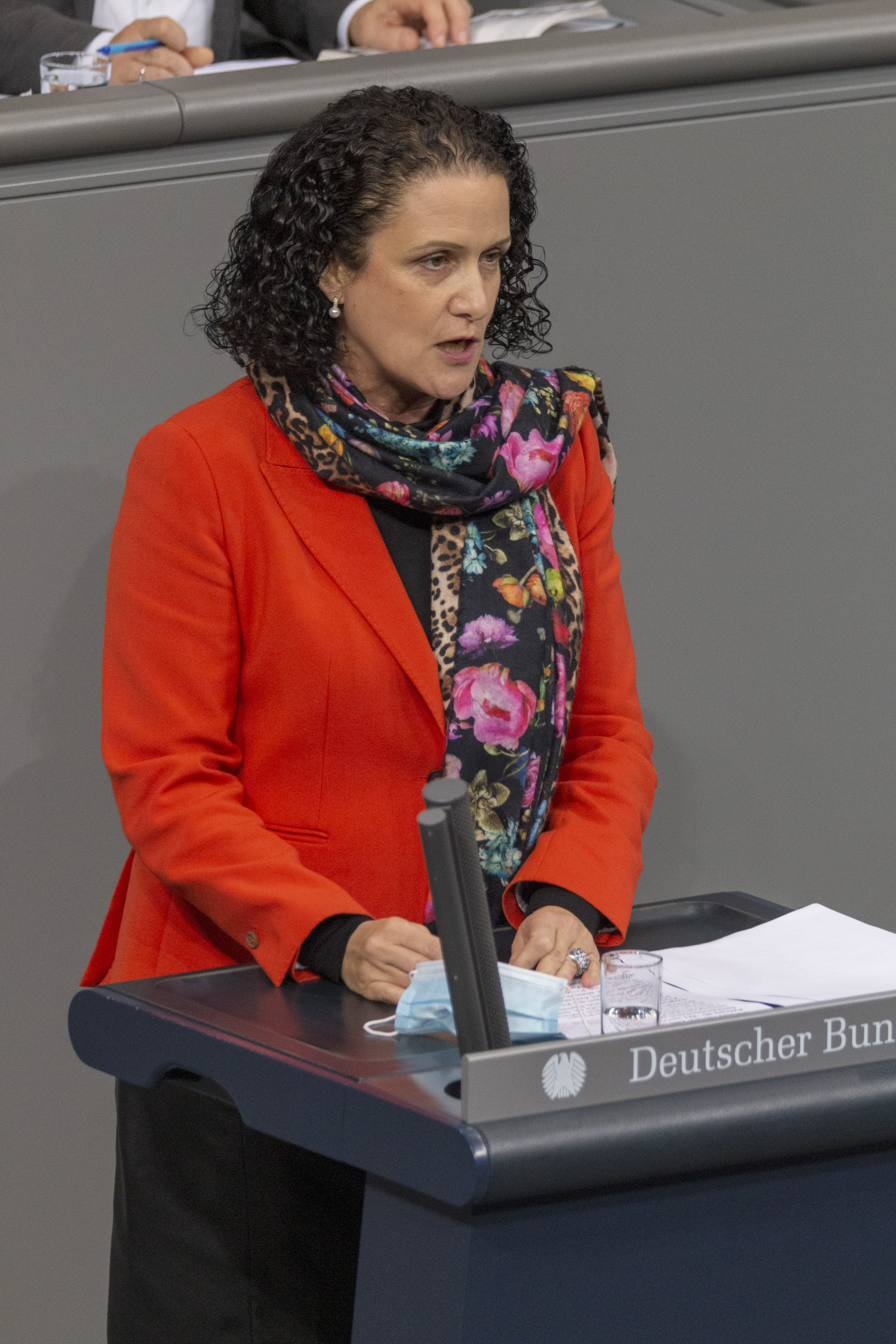
- Höchst in 2020

Member of the Bundestag
- Incumbent
- Assumed office 24 October 2017

Personal details
- Born: 10 February 1970 (age 56)
- Party: AfD

Nicole Höchst (born 10 February 1970) is a German politician for the Alternative for Germany (AfD) and since 2017 member of the Bundestag. Her positions are described by various interest groups as homophobic and hostile, which Höchst disputes.

== Life and politics ==
Höchst was born in 1970 in the West German town of Homburg (Saar) and became a teacher.

Höchst entered the AfD in 2015 and became after the 2017 German federal election a member of the Bundestag. She is a member of the Committee for Education, Research and Technology Assessment and the Committee on Family, Senior Citizens, Women and Youth. She criticized the concept of a third gender, partially in response to the Federal Constitutional Court's ruling that a third gender option was constitutionally necessary. (See also: Third gender law (Germany)). Her daughter is a member of the youth city council in Speyer. In late 2018, her daughter participated in a poetry competition, in which she read a poem that was widely deemed as racist, in which she criticized political correctness, so-called civil courage and mass immigration. She was disqualified and Speyer's mayor Monika Kabs later accused her of using racist comments to further her mother's political campaigns.
