= Schutzbereich =

German legal term

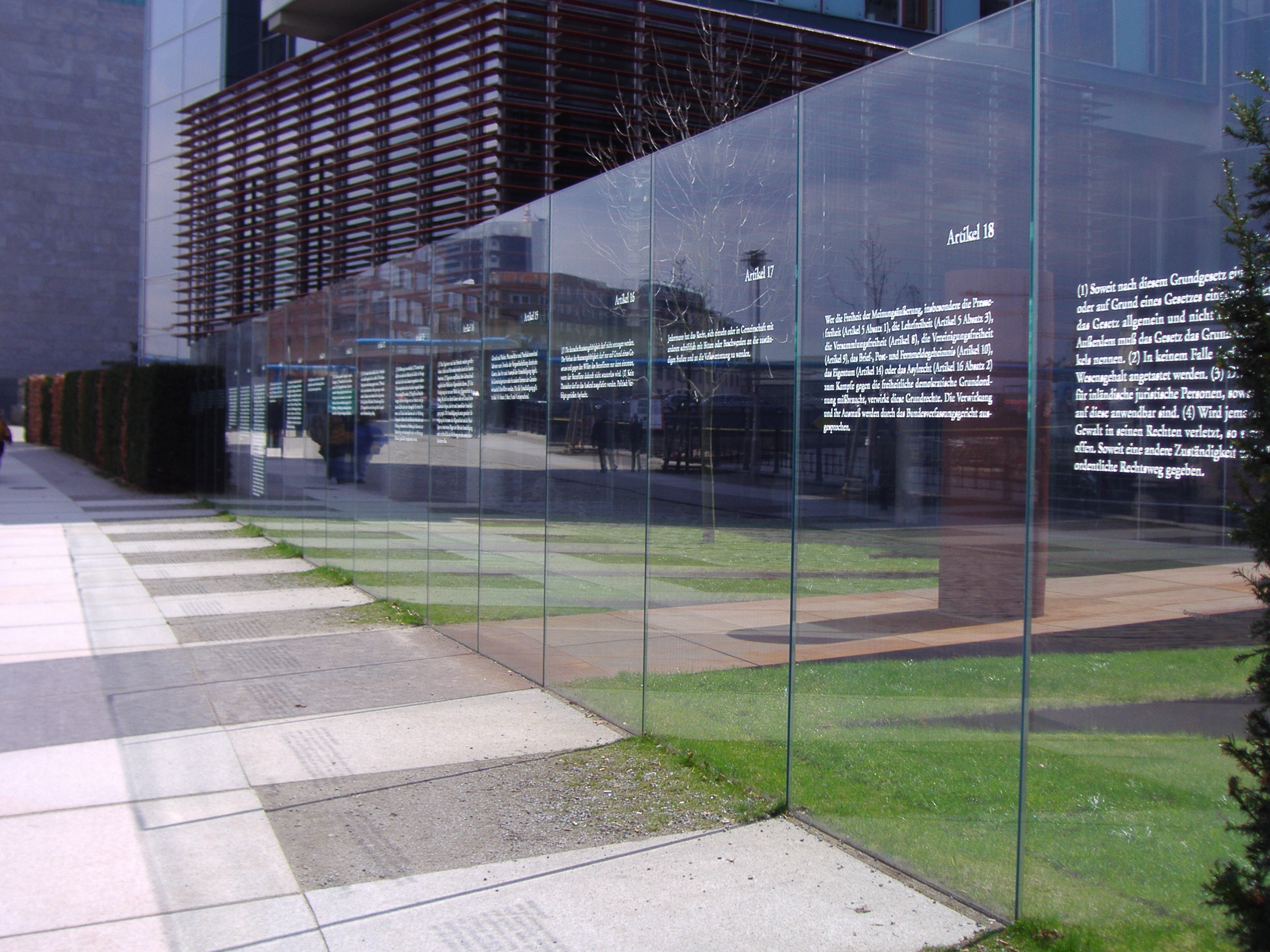
The Grundrechte at Jakob Kaiser House, Berlin

A Schutzbereich (literally protection area) in German legal terminology refers to the extent or scope of protection afforded to people under one or more of the Grundrechte (Fundamental rights in the German Constitution). The question as to whether the act in question actually falls within the Schutzbereich in the concrete circumstances of the case, is the first of three requirements in determining whether a complaint of violation of the right is admissible before the Bundesverfassungsgericht (Federal Constitutional Court). A Grundrecht is breached where the act falls within the Schutzbereich of the Grundrecht, the Schutzbereich was invaded, and this invasion is not justified by constitutional limitations to the protection.

The only exception to this is the protection of human dignity (Art. 1 I GG). Any invasion of its Schutzbereich automatically constitutes a violation as by definition there can be no justification.
