= Act to Protect against Conversion Treatments (Germany) =

German law prohibiting conversion therapy

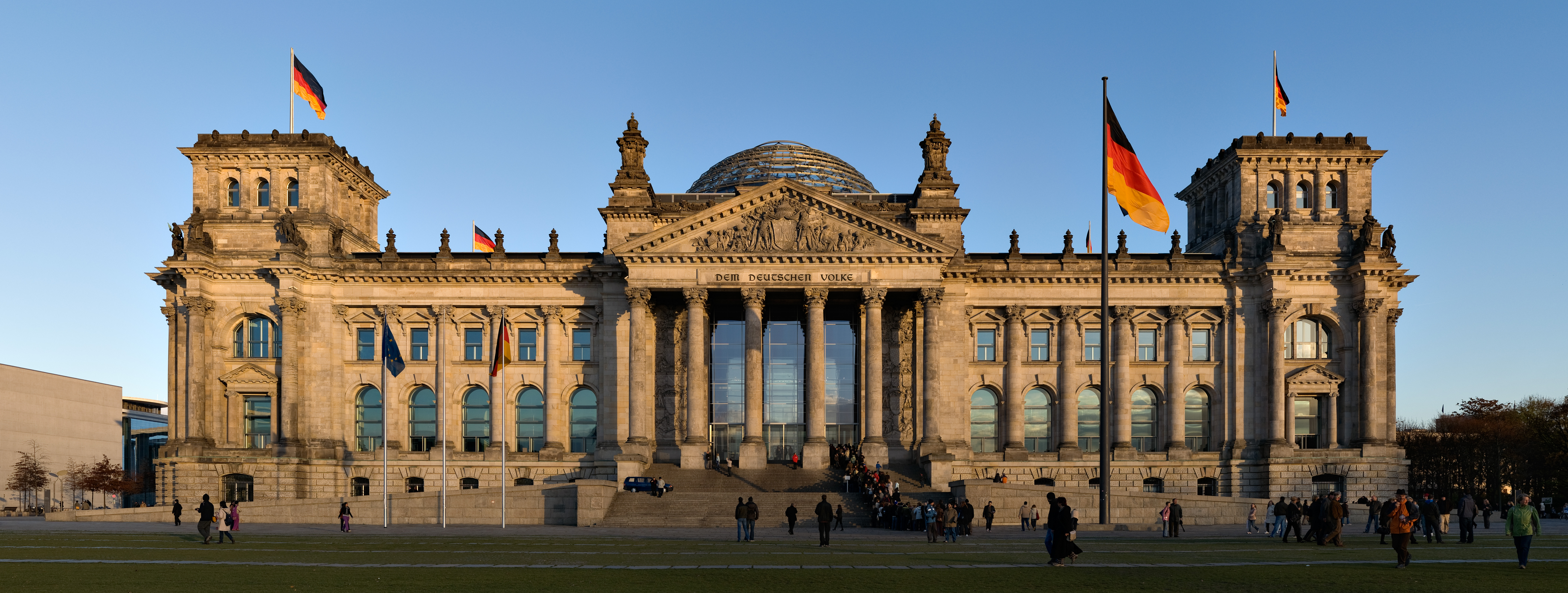

German Bundestag
- Long title: Act to Protect against Conversion Treatments German: Gesetz zum Schutz vor Konversionsbehandlungen
- Citation: Gesetz zum Schutz vor Konversionsbehandlungen of 12 June 2020
- Territorial extent: Germany
- Passed by: German Bundestag
- Passed: 7 May 2020
- Passed by: German Bundesrat
- Passed: 5 June 2020
- Signed by: President Frank-Walter Steinmeier
- Signed: 12 June 2020
- Commenced: 24 June 2020 (6 years ago)

Legislative history

Initiating chamber: German Bundestag
- Introduced: 19 February 2020
- First reading: 6 March 2020
- Second reading: 7 May 2020
- Third reading: 7 May 2020

Revising chamber: German Bundesrat
- Received from the German Bundestag: 15 May 2020
- Passed: 5 June 2020

Summary
- German federal law that makes conversion therapy a criminal offence
- Status: In force

The Act to Protect against Conversion Treatments (German: Gesetz zum Schutz vor Konversionsbehandlungen) is a German federal law. It prohibits the use of conversion therapy (called conversion treatment in the Act) on minors and adults who have not given their effective consent, and makes it a criminal offence. Conversion treatments are defined as treatments "aimed at changing or suppressing sexual orientation or self-perceived gender identity", but not the treatment of "medically recognised disorders of sexual preference" or surgical and hormonal gender-affirming measures.

Public advertising, offering and brokering conversion therapies is punishable as an administrative offence. Brokering conversion therapy for a minor is generally punishable as aiding and abetting the performance of the treatment in accordance with § 27 German Criminal Code in conjunction with § 5 of this Act if the brokered conversion therapy was performed.

The World Health Organisation (WHO) has declared that both homosexuality and transgender identity are not mental disorders, and that there is no indication for therapy. Since 1991, homosexuality has no longer been listed as a mental disorder in the ICD-10, and "transsexualism" was removed from the chapter on mental disorders when the ICD-11 came into force in 2022.

In 2013, the World Medical Association condemned conversion therapy as a violation of human rights that is incompatible with medical ethics. The following year, the German Medical Assembly of the German Medical Association issued a warning about its negative health effects.

== Counselling service ==
The Act requires the Federal Institute of Public Health (BIÖG) to offer free and anonymous counselling. This is to be provided as a telephone and online counselling service for people affected by conversion therapy or their relatives, as well as for people in general who are dealing with issues of sexual orientation and gender identity. It is provided via the website Liebesleben.de (see External links).
