= Transsexuals Act (Germany) =

Former Gender law in Germany (1981–2024)

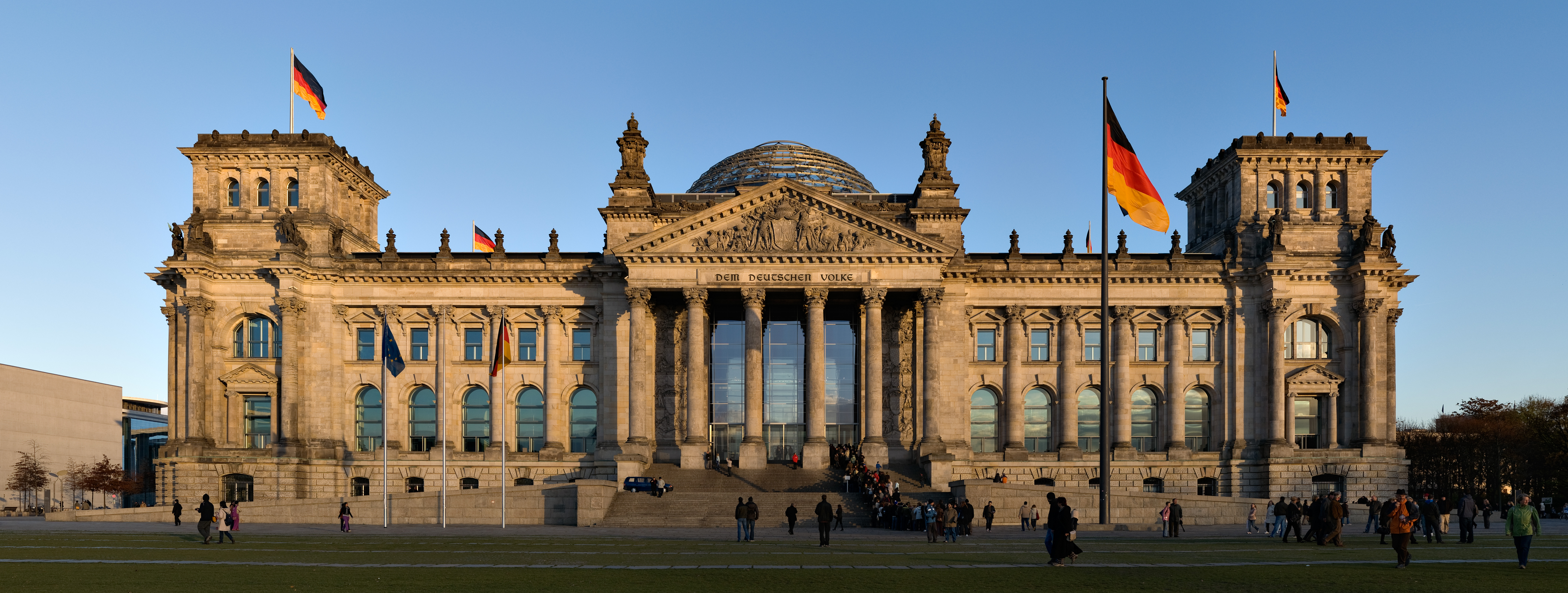

German Bundestag
- Long title: Law on changing first names and determining gender in special cases German: Gesetz über die Änderung der Vornamen und die Feststellung der Geschlechtszugehörigkeit in besonderen Fällen
- Citation: Transsexuellengesetz (TSG)
- Territorial extent: Germany
- Passed by: German Bundestag
- Passed: 4 July 1980
- Passed by: German Bundesrat
- Passed: 4 July 1980
- Signed by: President Karl Carstens
- Signed: 8 September 1980
- Commenced: 1 January 1981
- Repealed: 1 November 2024

Repealed by
- Self-Determination Act

Summary
- German Federal Act on the Change of Gender and First Name in Civil Status
- Status: Repealed

The Transsexuals Act (German: Transsexuellengesetz, TSG) was a German federal law that allowed people who did not feel they belonged to their gender to change their first name and gender in their civil status.

To changed either name or gender, two independent medical court experts had to be commissioned by the judge. They were asked to evaluate, whether

- the person "does not identify with the birth-assigned sex/gender, but with the other one", and
- "feels a compulsion to live according to his/her ideas for at least three years", and
- it is to be assumed with high probability, that the feeling of belonging to the other sex/gender is not going to change".

The law was repealed and replaced by the Self-Determination Act on 1 November 2024.

== Legislative history ==
In 1980, West Germany passed a law regulating the change of first names and legal gender, the Gesetz über die Änderung der Vornamen und die Feststellung der Geschlechtszugehörigkeit in besonderen Fällen, (Transsexuellengesetz – TSG) or, "Law concerning the change of first name and determination of gender identity in special cases" (Transsexual law). Since 1990, following the reunification of East and West Germany, it applies to all of Germany.

== Details ==
=== Name changes ===
One can either obtain a change of name alone, and proceed later with a change of legal gender, if possible or desired, or obtain both in a single legal procedure.

The name change becomes legally void if a child of the trans person is born more than 300 days after the name change.

Several court decisions have further specified several matters. For example, a person with only a name change has the right to be called "Herr" or "Frau" (Mr. or Ms.) according to their first name, not their legal gender; similarly, documents have to be issued reflecting their actual gender identity, not legal gender. Job references, certifications and similar from the time before the change of name may be reissued with the new name, so effectively there is no way for a new employer to learn about the change of name and/or legal gender. Also, people with only a name change do not have to divulge their legal gender to employers.

A name change is registered as previous last names in the resident registration (German "Melderegister"). It is also registered in the Federal Central Tax Office as previous last names with the Tax Identification Number. Based on the previous last names there can be seen the previous gender.

=== Gender marker changes ===
To change legal gender before 2011, it used to be required that the person:

- was permanently infertile, and
- has had surgery through which their outer sexual characteristics are changed to a "significant approximation" to the appearance of their preferred biological sex.

The administrative procedure for changing the legal gender under the TSG is lengthy and costly, requiring several assessments. According to a government study, the average cost for the assessments is 1,660 euros, with an additional 206 euros spent on court fees, on average. According to the LGBTQ rights association LSVD^{+}, some medical professionals that conduct the assessments also ask invasive questions about intimate details such as sexual fantasies, their underwear, masturbatory behaviour and other sexual practices. This contrasts with a comparatively easier process for intersex people under § 45b PStG.

=== Constitutional challenges ===
The TSG has been found unconstitutional on a variety of grounds by the Federal Constitutional Court since its inception. In 1982, the requirement that a candidate be 25 years of age was found in violation of the equality clause of the German Constitution (Art. 3). In 2006, the court ordered lawmakers to amend the law so that the TSG would apply for non-Germans who have legal residency status in Germany, as long as their country of citizenship does not have equivalent laws. In 2008, the court declared that the requirement that a candidate be unmarried was unconstitutional. In January 2011, the court declared the criteria for gender change requiring gender-affirming surgery and sterilization or infertility unconstitutional.
