= Self-Determination Act (Germany) =

Gender law in Germany

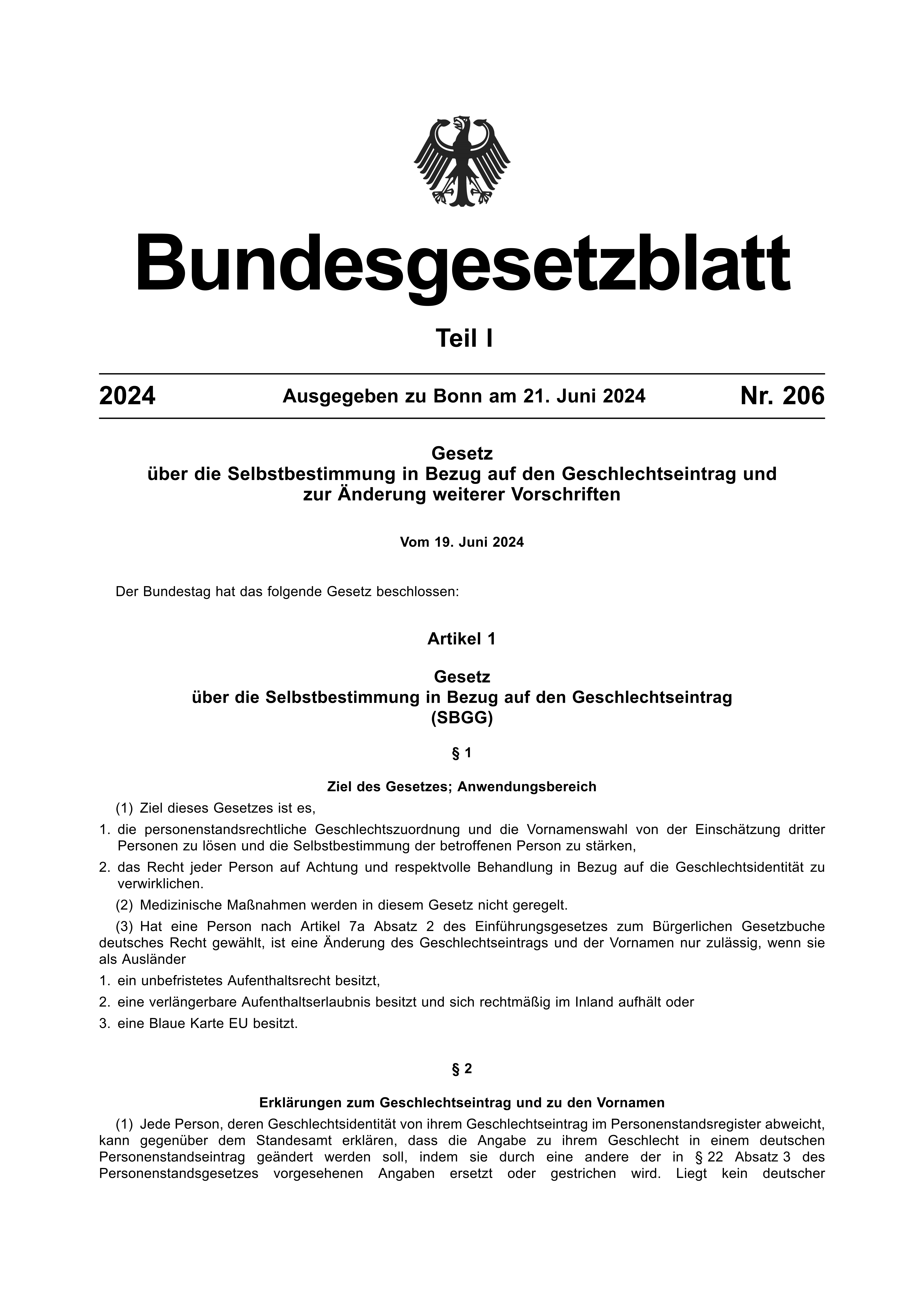
- First page of the law in the Federal Law Gazette

German Bundestag
- Long title: Act on Self-Determination with Regard to Gender Entry German: Gesetz über die Selbstbestimmung in Bezug auf den Geschlechtseintrag
- Citation: Gesetz über die Selbstbestimmung in Bezug auf den Geschlechtseintrag (SBGG) of 19 June 2024
- Territorial extent: Germany
- Passed by: German Bundestag
- Passed: 12 April 2024
- Passed by: German Bundesrat
- Passed: 17 May 2024
- Signed by: President Frank-Walter Steinmeier
- Signed: 19 June 2024
- Commenced: 1 November 2024 (22 months ago)

Codification
- Acts repealed: Transsexuals Act; German: Transsexuellengesetz

Legislative history

Initiating chamber: German Bundestag
- Introduced: 1 November 2023
- First reading: 15 November 2023
- Second reading: 12 April 2024
- Third reading: 12 April 2024
- Voting summary: 372 voted for; 251 voted against; 11 abstained; 100 absent

Revising chamber: German Bundesrat
- Received from the German Bundestag: 26 April 2024
- Passed: 17 May 2024

Summary
- German federal law on the free and independent determination of legal gender
- Status: In force

Countries in Europe allowing gender self-identification

The Act on Self-Determination with Regard to Gender Entry (German: Gesetz über die Selbstbestimmung in Bezug auf den Geschlechtseintrag, SBGG), unofficially also called Self-Determination Act (German: Selbstbestimmungsgesetz), is intended to make it easier for transgender, intersex, genderless and non-binary people in Germany to have their gender entry and first name changed.

A draft bill of the law has been available since May 2023. Following detailed changes, it was passed as a government draft on 23 August 2023. Further changes were made before it was adopted by the German Bundestag on 12 April 2024 and passed the German Bundesrat on 17 May 2024. The law was promulgated in the Bundesgesetzblatt on 21 June 2024 and came into force on 1 November 2024.

The law stipulates that the gender entry and first name can be changed by simply making a declaration at the Standesamt; a three-month waiting period must be observed beforehand. Medical measures are neither regulated nor mandated by the SBGG.

With the entry into force of the Self-Determination Act on 1 November 2024, the Transsexuals Act (German: Transsexuellengesetz, TSG), which prescribes a complex expert procedure and judicial recognition of the changes for changing the gender entry and name, has been repealed. It also replaced the main provisions introduced by the Third Gender Act, which previously only allowed intersex people to legally identify as a third, non-binary gender.

== Details ==
The SBGG standardizes the regulations for transgender and intersex individuals regarding changes to their gender entry and first names. Medical measures are not regulated by the SBGG (Section 1, subsection 2).

To change the gender entry and first names, a declaration must be made before the registry office (Section 2, subsection 1), along with an assurance that the chosen gender entry or the removal of the gender entry best corresponds to the person's gender identity (Section 2, subsection 2). For minors over the age of 14, the consent of a legal representative (or the family court) is required (Section 3, subsection 1); for minors under the age of 14, only the legal representative may submit the declaration (Section 3, subsection 2). The minor or the legal representative must also declare that they have received counseling (Section 3, subsection 1). The declaration to change the gender entry and first names must be notified to the registry office three months in advance (Section 4). After the change, a one-year waiting period applies during which no further changes may be made (Section 5).

Domestic rules (Section 6, subsection 2), sport (Section 6, subsection 3) and health-related measures or services (Section 6, subsection 4) are independent of the gender entry.

If a state of tension or defense is declared and a change in gender entry was declared no more than two months prior, the previous classification as male remains in effect with regard to military service (Section 9).

Documents containing the old gender or first names must be reissued upon request, provided a legitimate interest can be demonstrated (Section 10).

The SBGG prohibits disclosing or investigating former gender entries and first names (Section 13). However, in cases of "special reasons of public interest", e.g. for criminal prosecution, this prohibition is suspended (Section 13, subsection 1, number 2). Anyone who violates the prohibition on disclosure and intentionally causes harm to the person concerned commits an administrative offense and is subject to a fine of up to €10,000 (Section 14).

The federal government is required to review the law within five years and report its findings to the Bundestag.

== Legislative history ==
The law was initiated by the progressive traffic light coalition and voted upon in the Bundestag on 12 April 2024. It was adopted with 372 votes in favour, 251 against, 11 abstentions and 100 absent.

The law passed the Bundesrat on 17 May 2024. A motion to refer the matter to the mediation committee (German: Vermittlungsausschuss) failed to gain a majority.

The law was promulgated in the Bundesgesetzblatt on 21 June 2024 and came into force on 1 November 2024.

== Criticism ==
Queer associations criticised the final draft for the 3-month waiting period, which did not previously exist in TSG and § 45b PStG. Furthermore, trans people with legal guardians (due to impairments or disabilities) would not get self-ID under the draft. Legal guardians should be there to protect vulnerable people from things like giving away their possessions, but not to prevent them from coming out as trans, the association "Queer Handicap" argued.

In a letter dated 13 June 2024, United Nations Special Rapporteur on Violence Against Women Reem Alsalem criticised the Self-Determination Act. She cautioned that the current measures in place to safeguard women and girls from male perpetrators of violence were inadequate, and highlighted the potential for minors aged 14 and above to alter their gender registration without the consent of their legal guardians. Furthermore, she identified the prohibition on disclosure as a potential infringement on freedom of expression. The Federal Government of Germany rejected the accusations. For years, queer organisations have accused Alsalem of abusing her position to spread anti-trans policies. In 2023, the women's rights organisation Association for Women's Rights in Development (AWID) published an open letter in which it made serious accusations against Alsalem: "The UN Special Rapporteur is abusing her position and power to promote discriminatory policies against trans people and disregard established human rights principles". The letter was signed by hundreds of women's and LGBTI organisations, including the National Council of German Women's Organizations and ILGA World.

== Statistics from the Federal Statistical Office ==
=== 2024 ===
According to the Federal Statistical Office of Germany, there were already 10,589 gender entry changes nationwide in the first two months after the law came into force (November and December 2024). From January to October 2024, there were only 596 cases under the old Transsexuals Act. Of the declarations submitted in 2024, 33% involved changes from male to female and 45% from female to male, accounting for more than three-quarters of all changes.

Gender entry changes in Germany as a whole in 2024 (final results)
Month	Male to female	Female to male	Male to diverse or to without gender entry	Female to diverse or to without gender entry	Other	In total
January to October	270	289	14	17	6	596
November	2,355	3,166	459	1,066	11	7,057
December	842	1,323	218	547	6	2,936
In total	3,467	4,778	691	1,630	23	10,589

=== 2025 ===
In total, 15,688 gender entry changes were made in 2025. 27% of the declarations from 2025 involved a change from male to female, and 42% involved a change from female to male. 20% were changes from female to diverse or to without gender entry, and 9% were changes from male to diverse or to without gender entry. As in the previous year, the majority of changes were from female to male.

Gender entry changes in Germany as a whole in 2025 (final results)
Month	Male to female	Female to male	Male to diverse or to without gender entry	Female to diverse or to without gender entry	Other	In total
In total	4,304	6,648	1,464	3,194	78	15,688

== Gallery of the Act published in the Federal Law Gazette ==
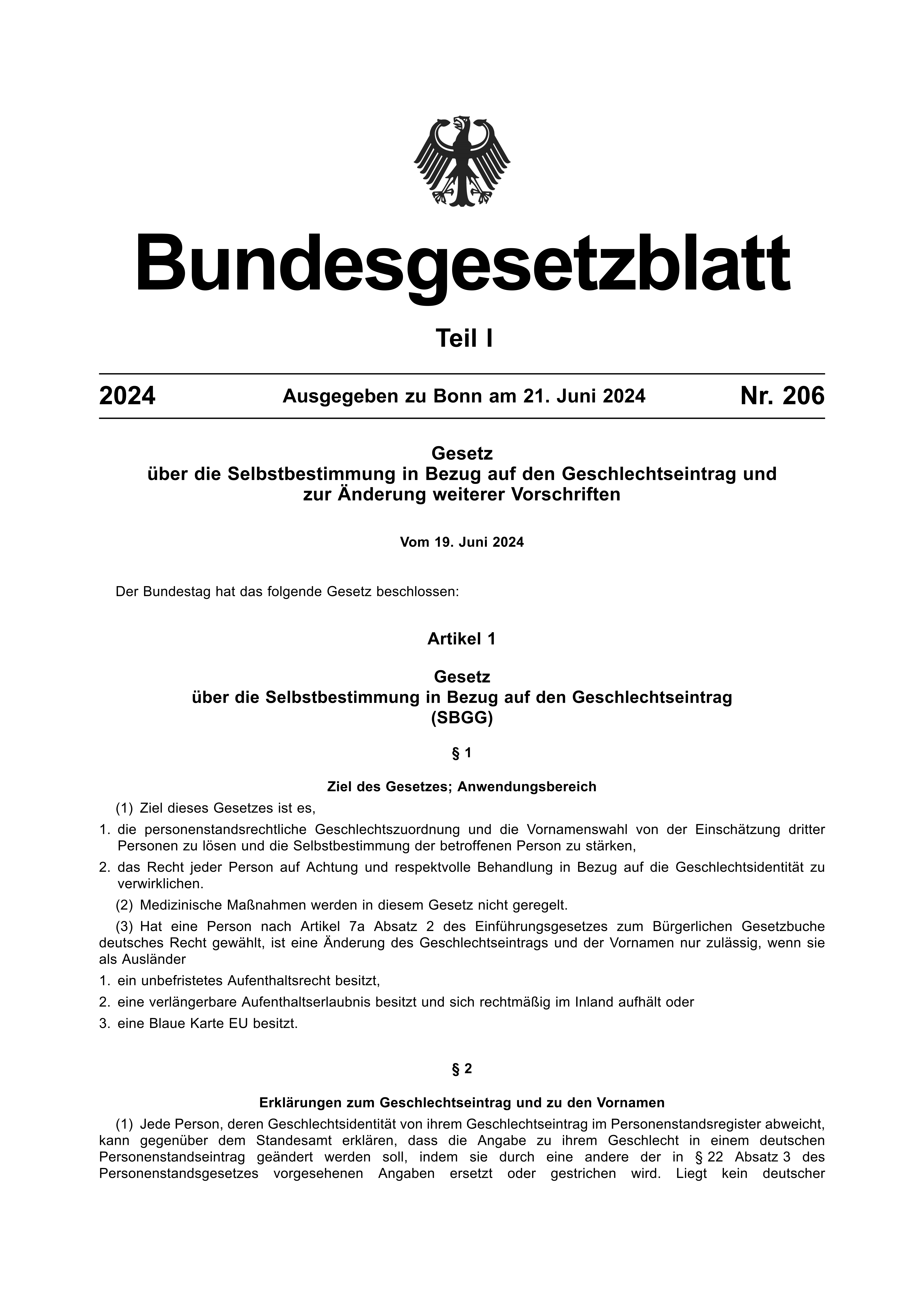
Page 1

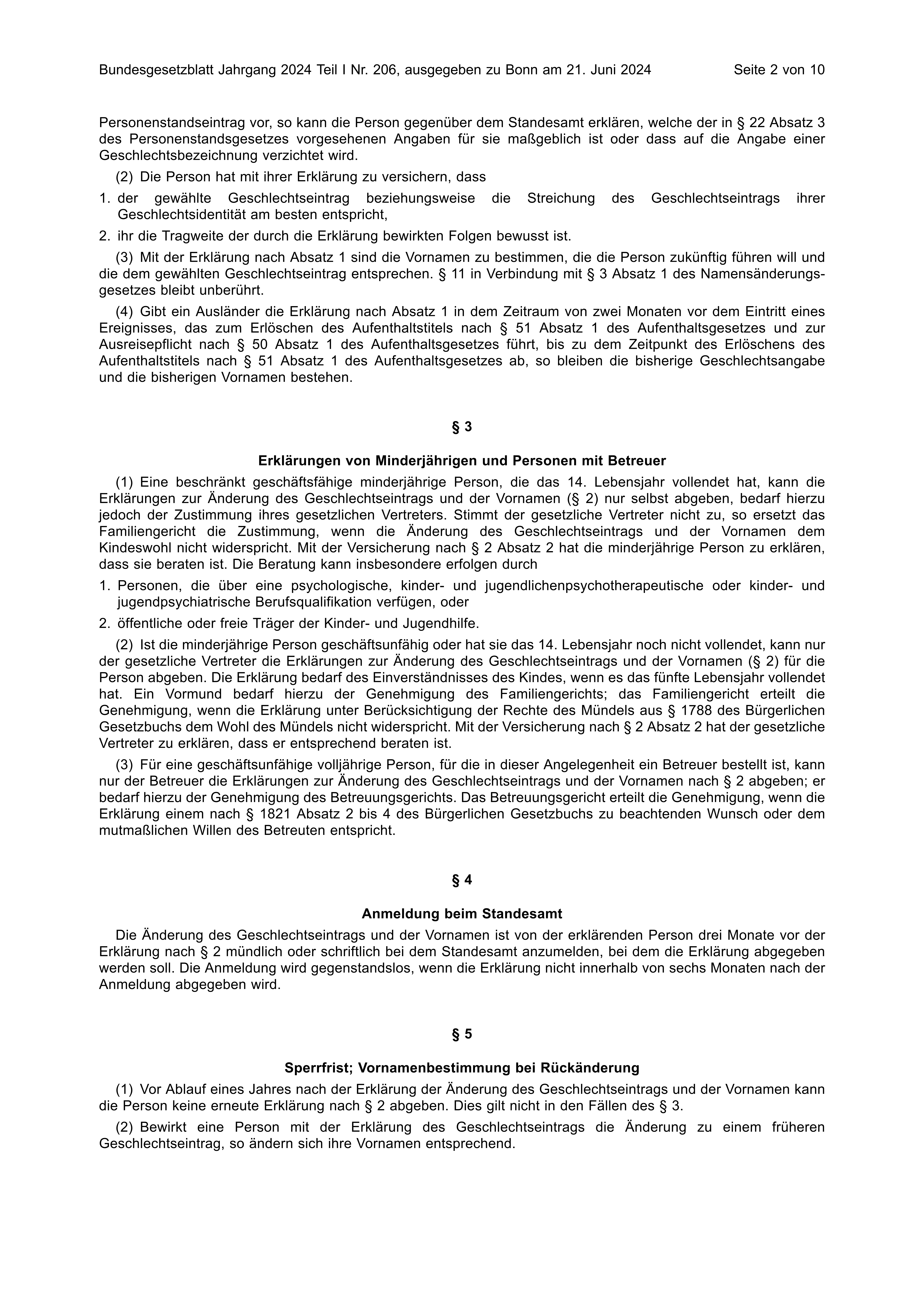
Page 2

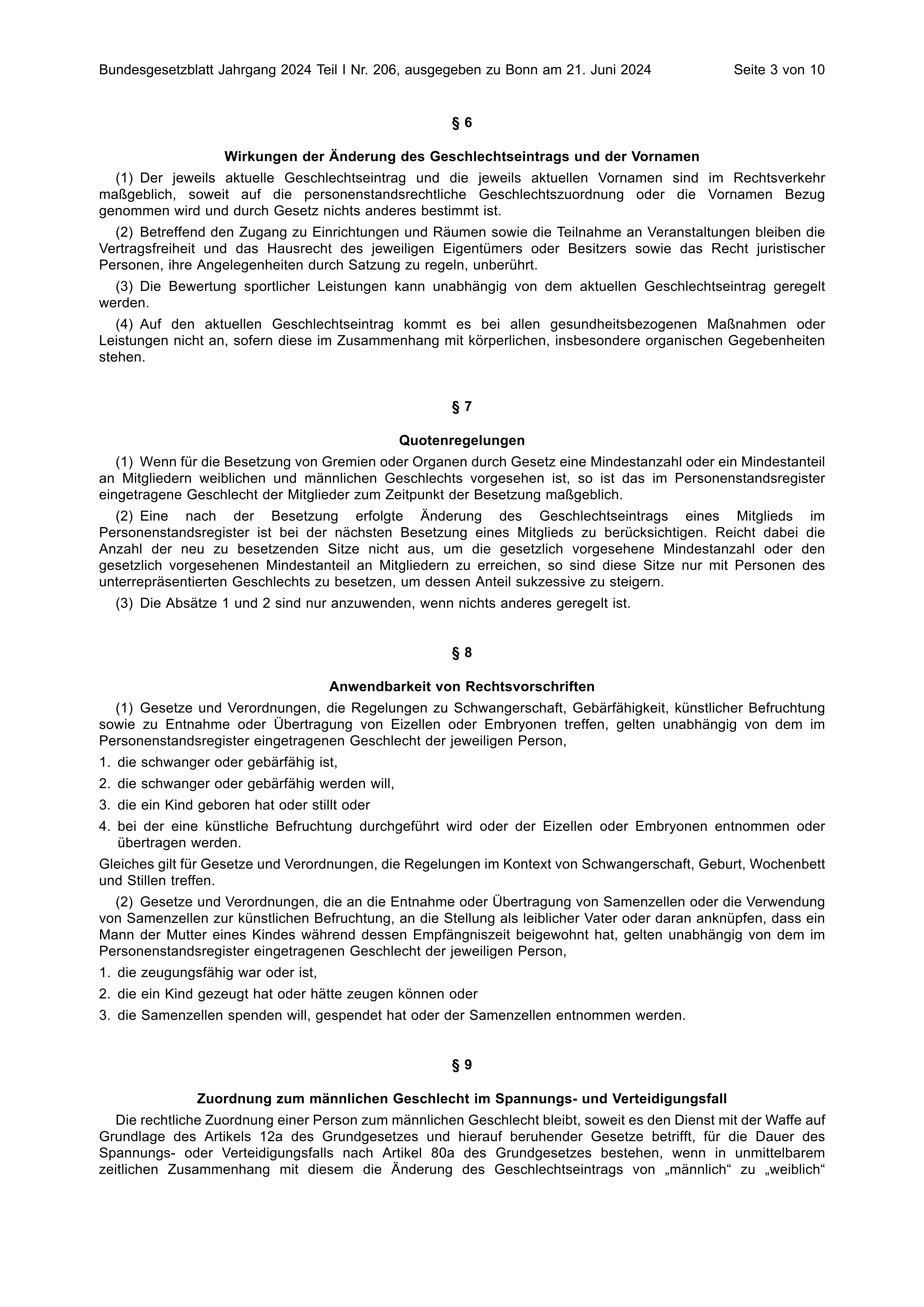
Page 3

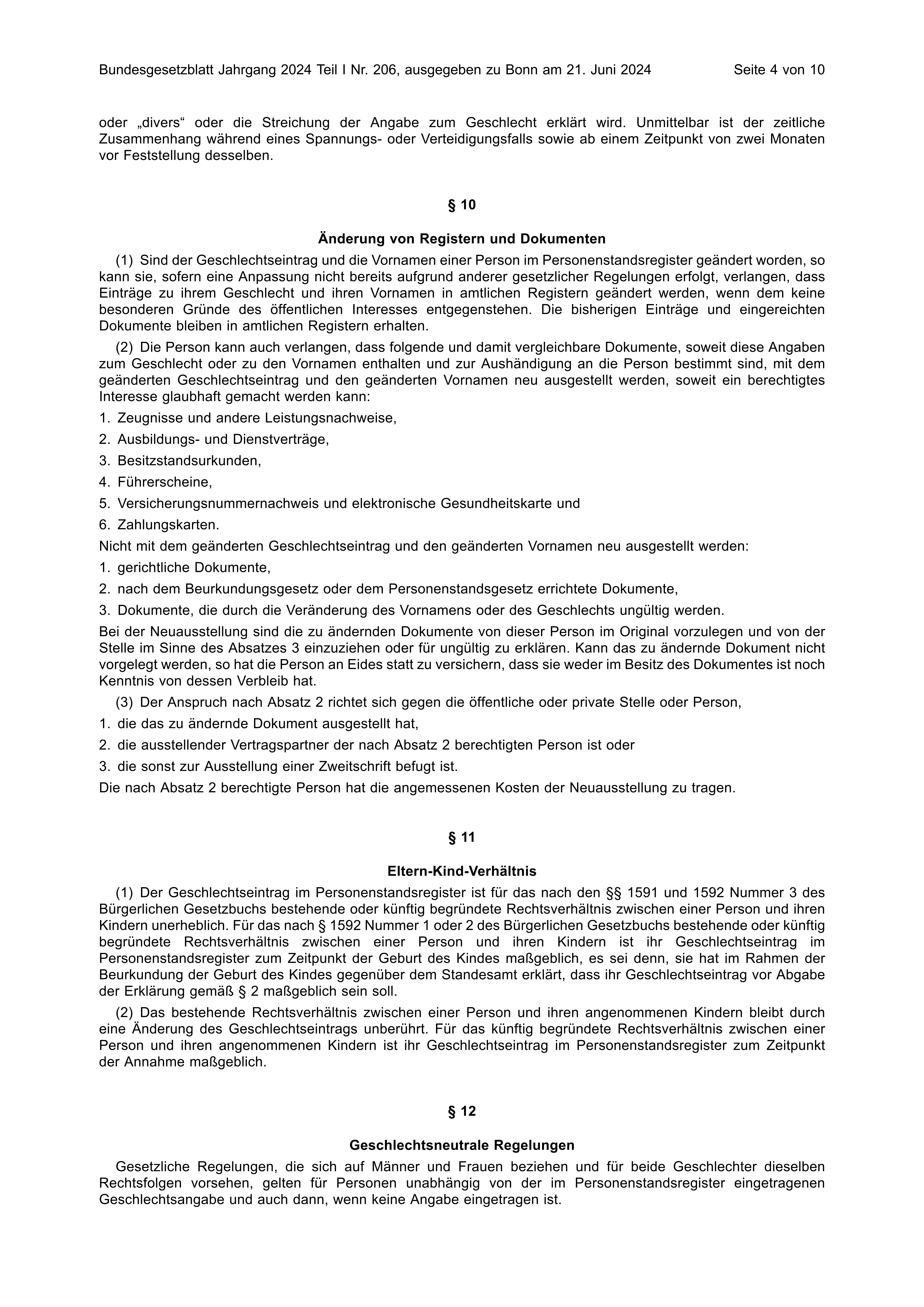
Page 4

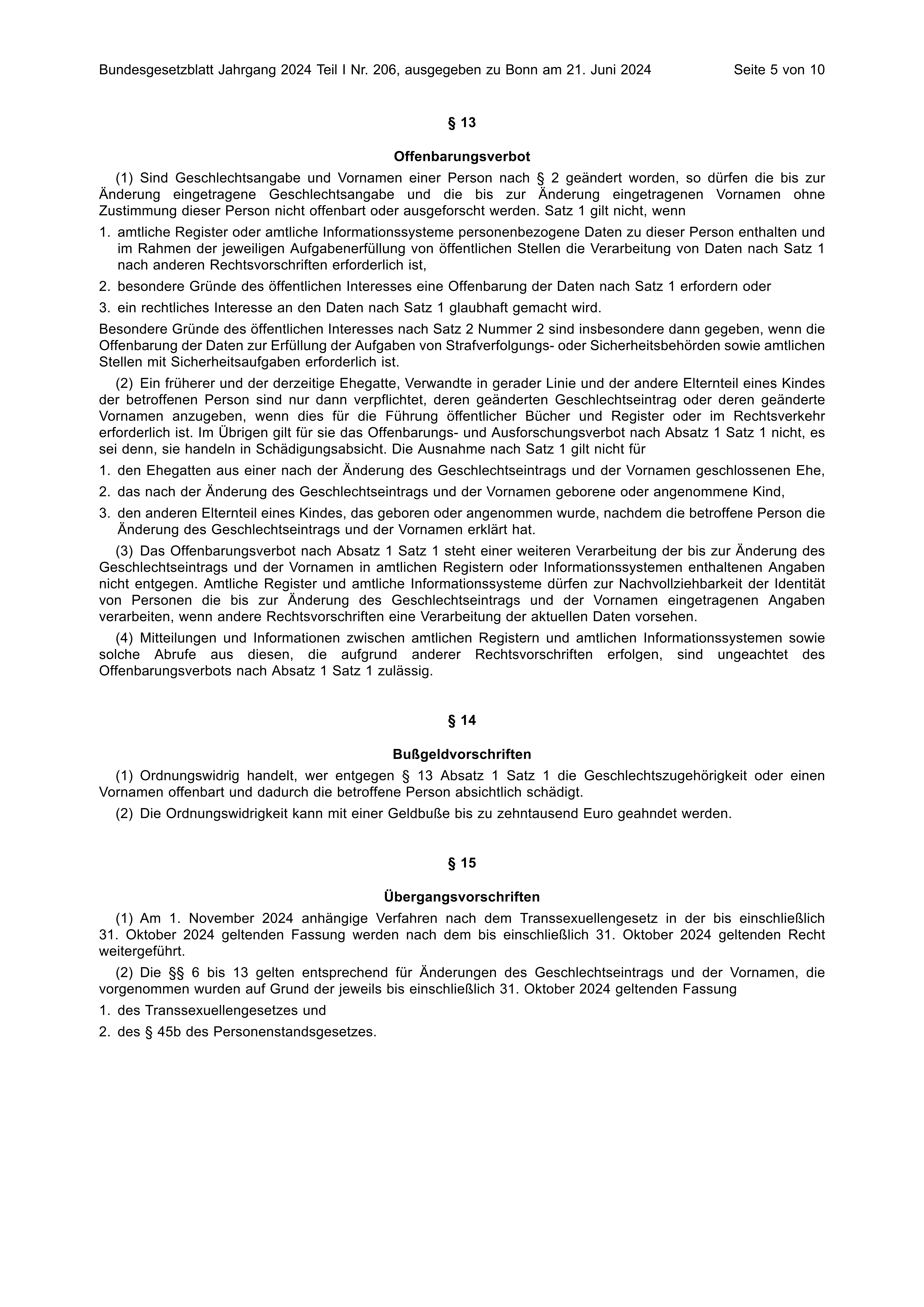
Page 5

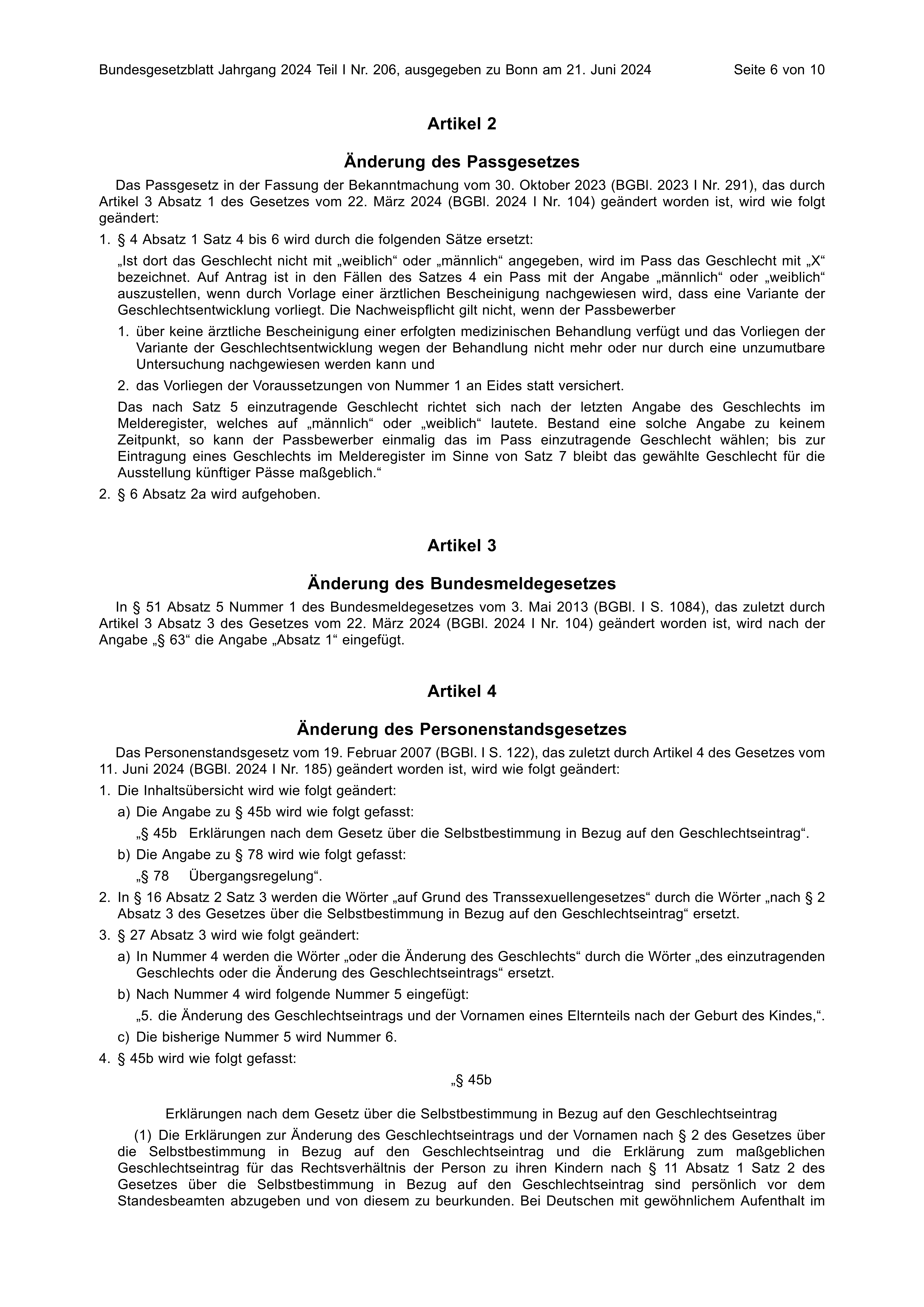
Page 6

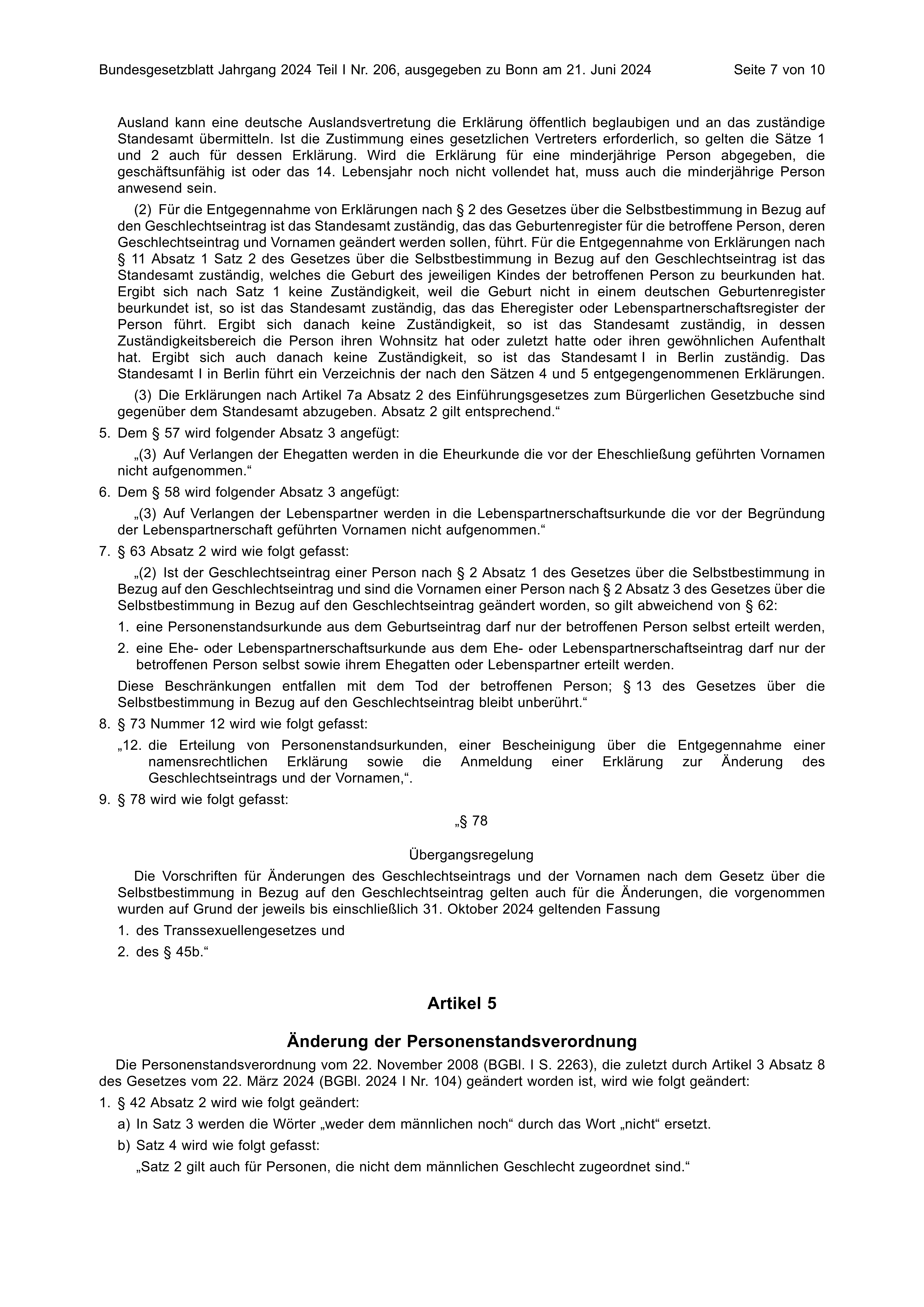
Page 7

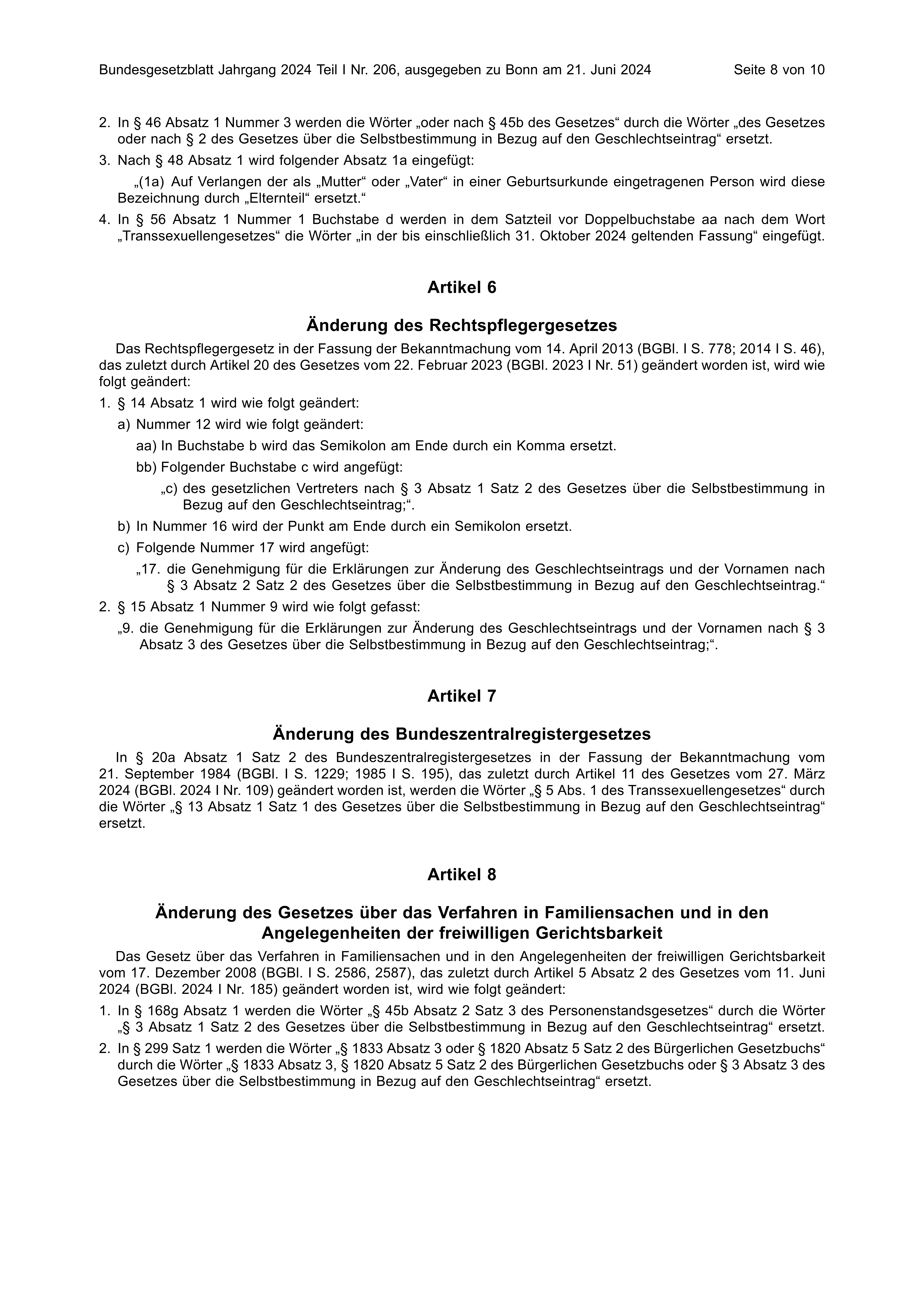
Page 8

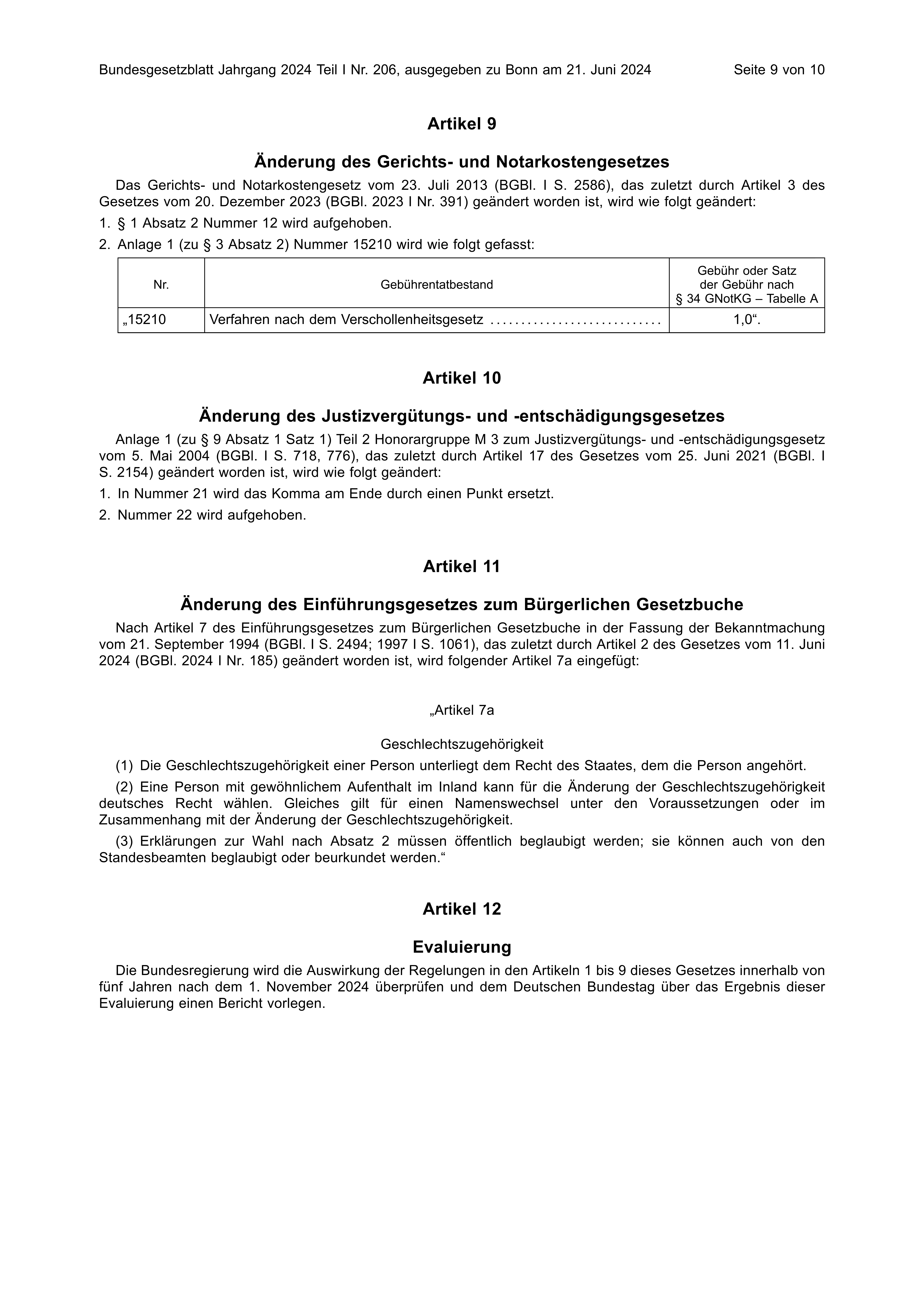
Page 9

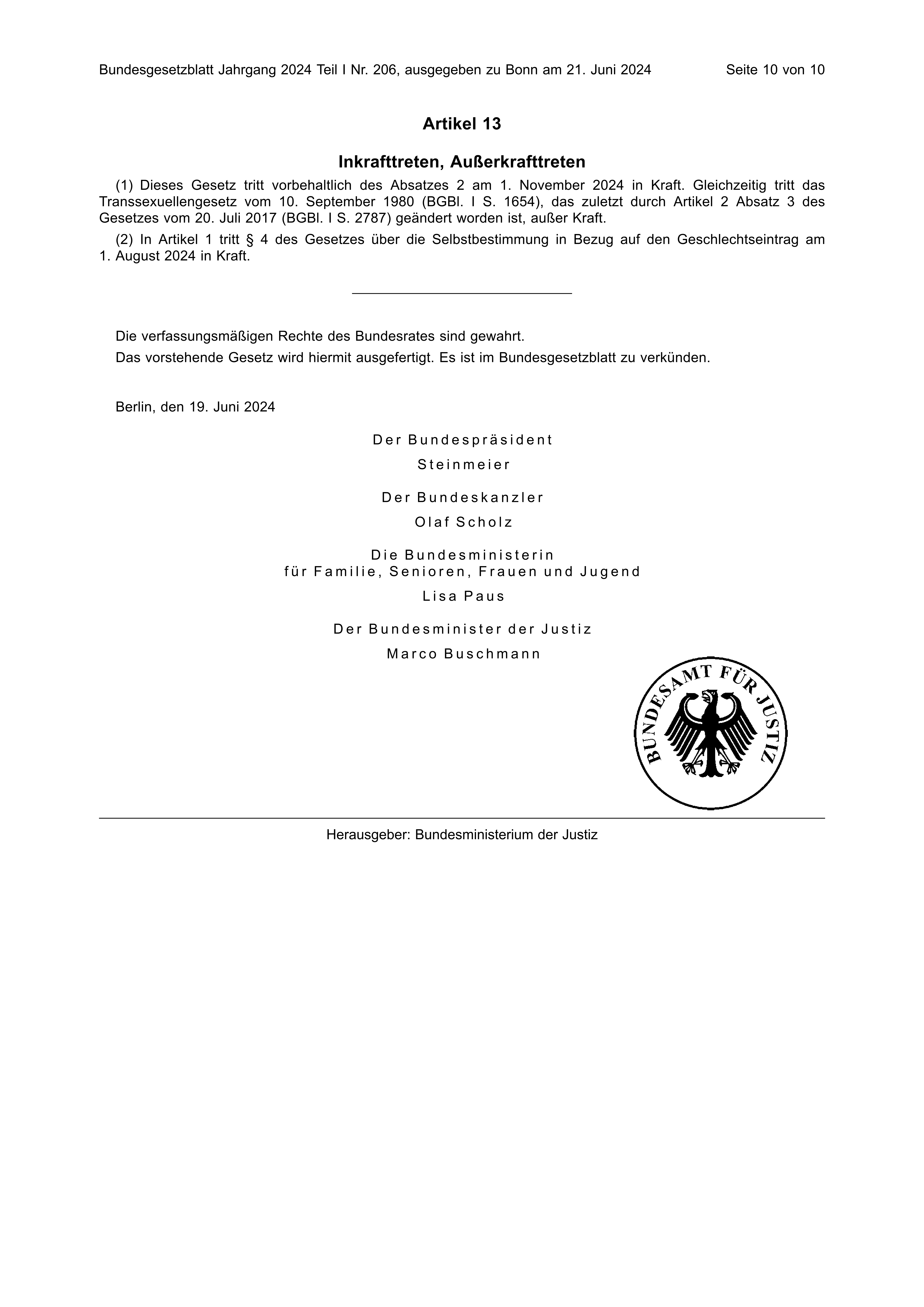
Page 10

== See also ==
- Transgender rights in Germany
- Legal recognition of non-binary gender
- Third Gender Act (Germany)
