= Third Gender Act (Germany) =

Gender law in Germany

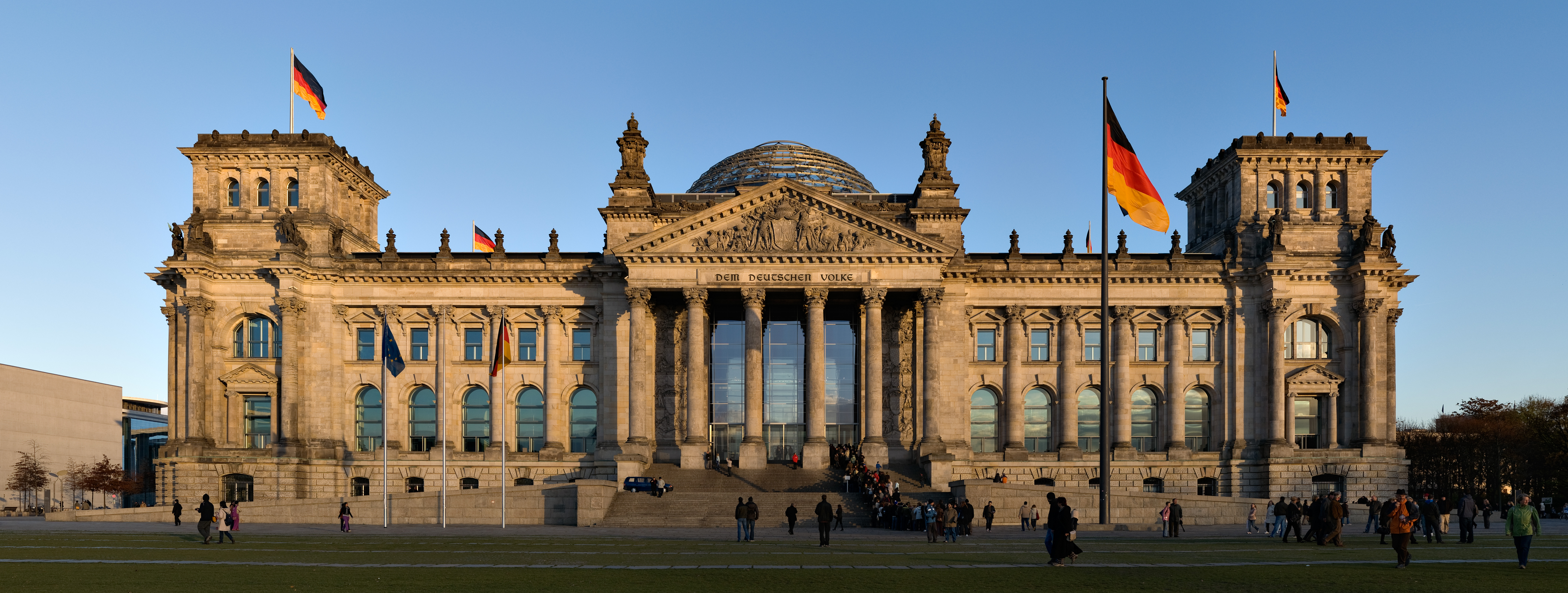

German Bundestag
- Long title: Act amending the Information to be Entered in the Register of Births (German: Gesetz zur Änderung der in das Geburtenregister einzutragenden Angaben)
- Citation: Gesetz zur Änderung der in das Geburtenregister einzutragenden Angaben
- Territorial extent: Germany
- Passed by: German Bundestag
- Passed: 13 December 2018
- Passed by: German Bundesrat
- Passed: 14 December 2018
- Signed by: President Frank-Walter Steinmeier
- Signed: 18 December 2018
- Commenced: 22 December 2018 (7 years ago)

Legislative history

Initiating chamber: German Bundestag
- Introduced: 1 October 2018
- First reading: 11 October 2018
- Second reading: 13 December 2018
- Third reading: 13 December 2018

Revising chamber: German Bundesrat
- Received from the German Bundestag: 14 December 2018
- Passed: 14 December 2018

Summary
- German federal law on the enabling of a third positive gender entry
- Status: In force

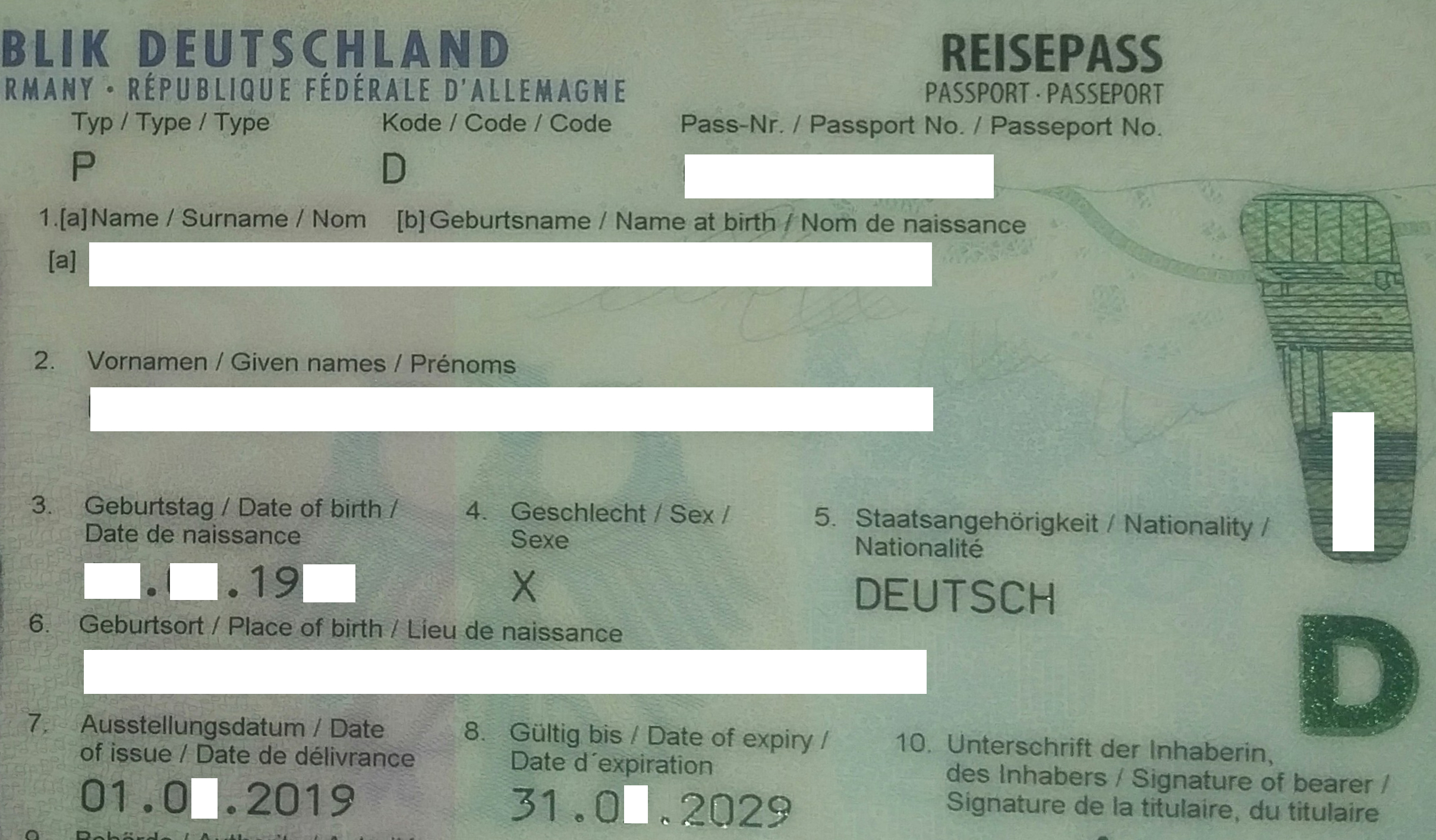
A German passport with the sex marker 'X' for 'Unspecified', according to ICAO Document 9303

The Act amending the Information to be Entered in the Register of Births (German: Gesetz zur Änderung der in das Geburtenregister einzutragenden Angaben), unofficially also called Third Gender Act, introduced the gender "diverse" (German: divers) in Germany as a third positive option in alternative to "female", "male" or without an entry in the German civil status register.

The law, codified in § 45b and § 22 PStG (German: Personenstandsgesetz), laid down an administrative procedure for assigning a diverse gender. It required a doctor's note confirming "a variant of sex development". The diverse gender can be assigned to people listed in the register, at birth or later in life. When individuals change their legal gender later in life, they can also change their first name.

The administrative process was officially aimed at intersex people, but nonbinary people (who were not intersex) have also tried to use it, due to its manageable burden compared to the gender entry change procedure for trans people at that time (Transsexuals Act). However, the Federal Court of Justice ruled on 22 April 2020 that § 45b could not be used by a nonbinary person who was not intersex.

The Third Gender Act took effect on 22 December 2018. A bill to ease the process for transgender, intersex and non-binary non-intersex people, the Self-Determination Act, was passed on April 12, 2024, and took effect in November 2024. It completely revised § 45b PStG and standardised the regulations for trans, inter and non-binary people in a single law.

== Legislative history ==
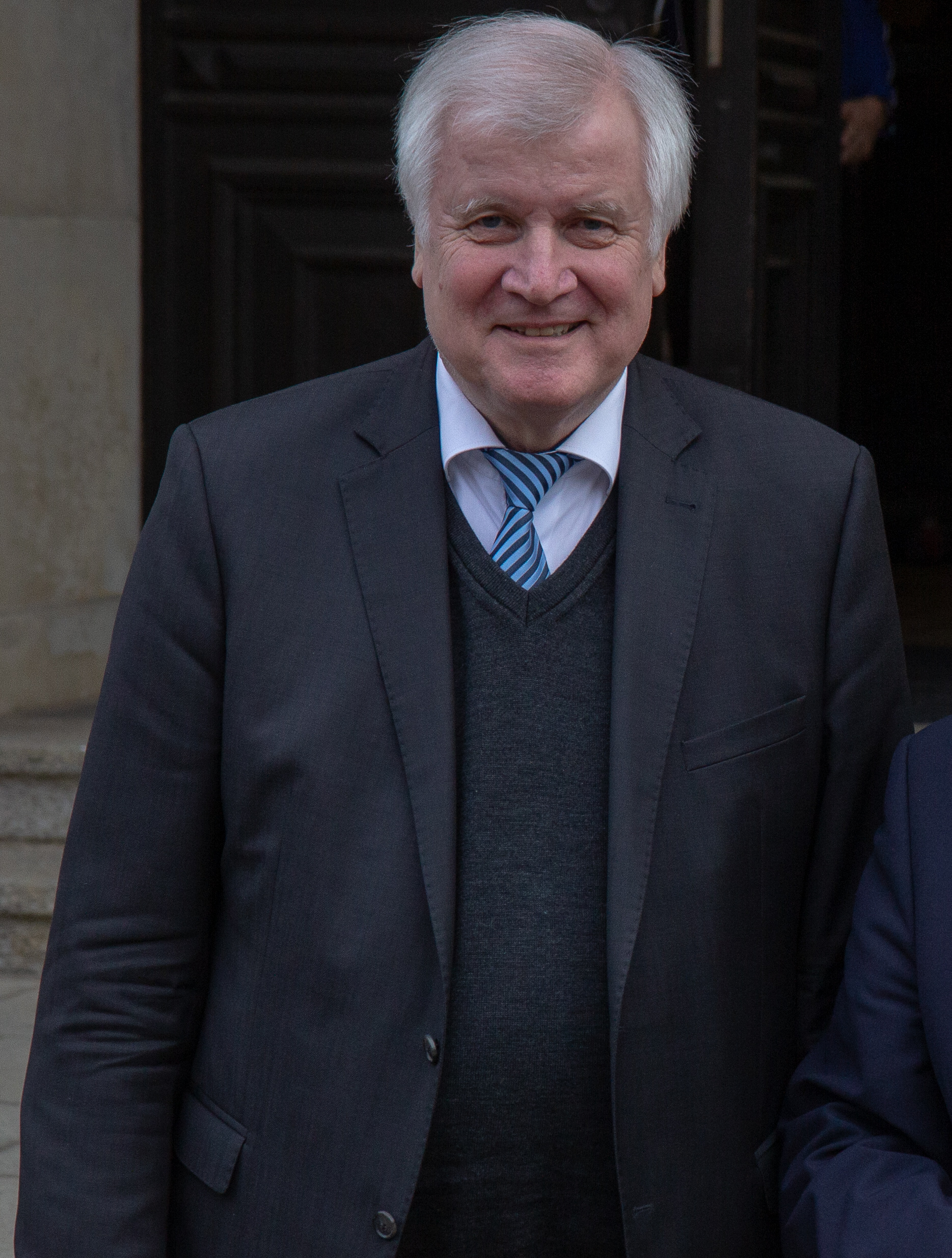
Horst Seehofer in 2018

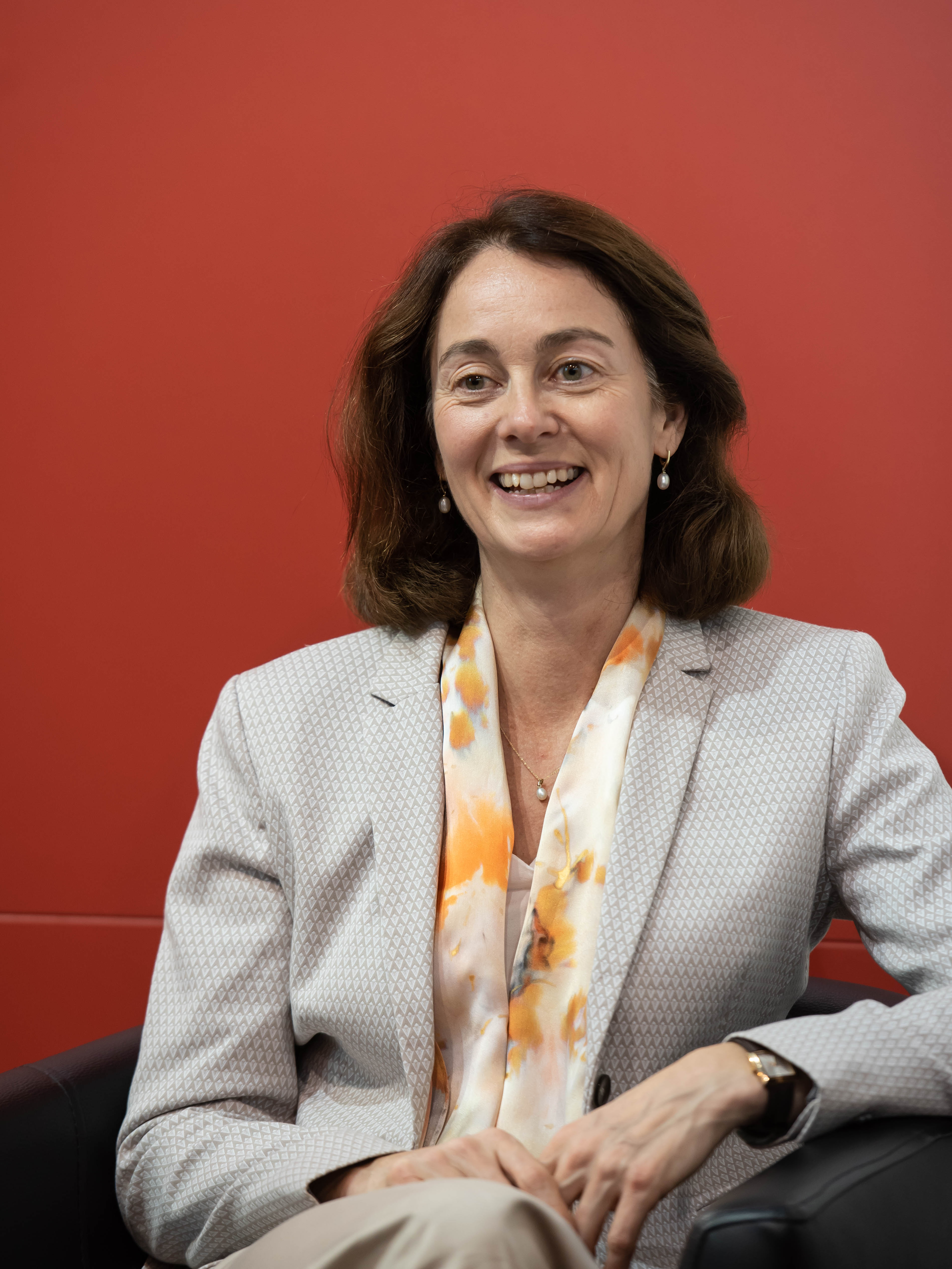
Katarina Barley in 2018

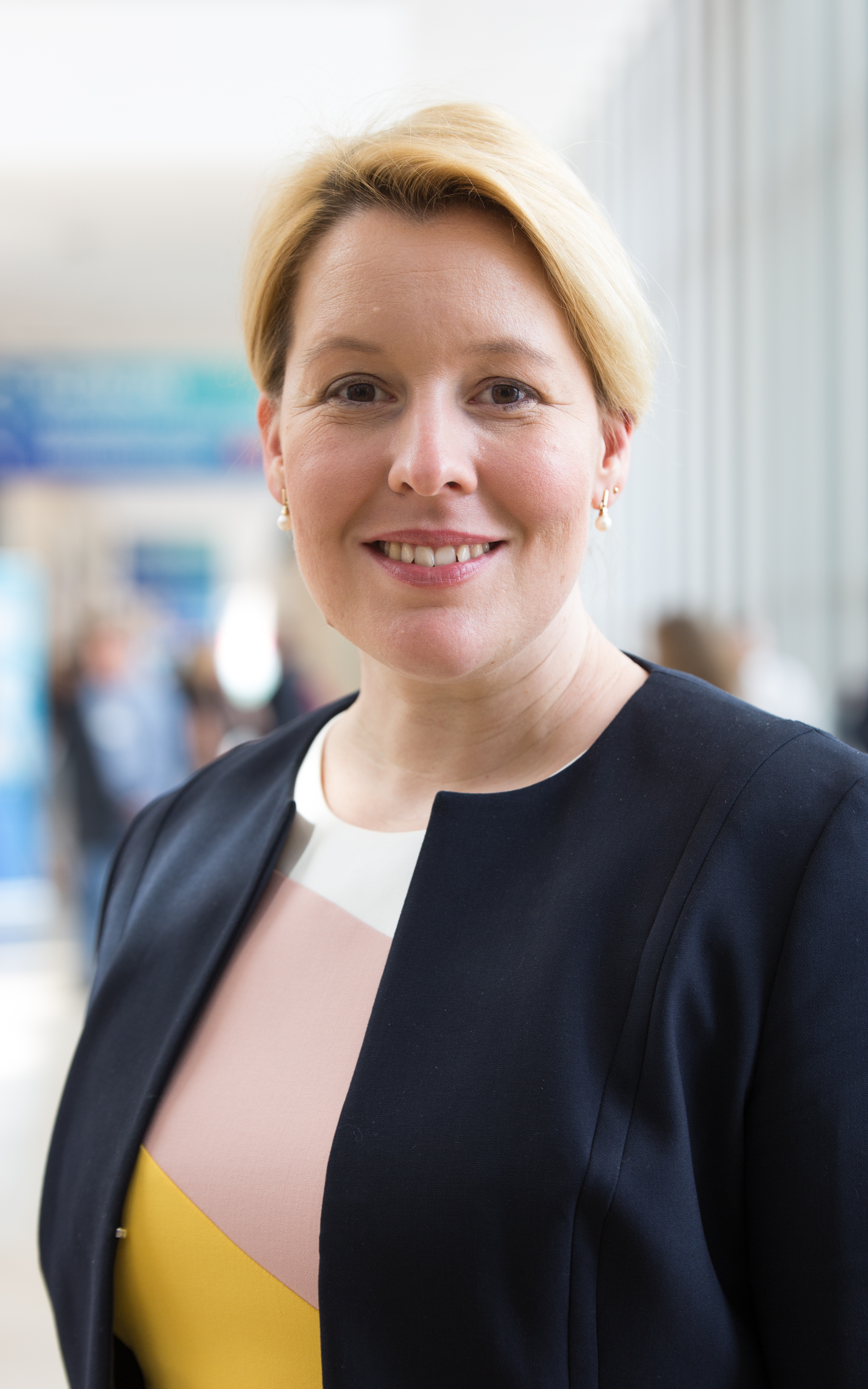
Franziska Giffey in 2018

Germany established a third positive gender option because, on 10 October 2017, the Federal Constitutional Court ruled that it was constitutionally necessary. The court decided that it was unconstitutional to refuse a third positive gender option for people "not clearly identifiable" as female or male,⁣ citing Articles 1, 2, and 3 of the German constitution. This ruling came in response to a constitutional complaint by Vanja, a 26-year-old intersex person from Leipzig at the time. Vanja had appealed his case up to the Constitutional Court.

The constitutional court ruling for the right to a third gender came shortly after federal elections in 2017. The elections led to the formation of a grand coalition of Christian Democrats, Social Democrats and the Christian Social Union. The coalition agreement was signed on 12 March 2018, and Horst Seehofer (Christian Social Union) became minister of the interior.

Minister Seehofer's legal draft provided for the third gender to be called "other" (German: anderes). However, justice minister Katarina Barley and family minister Franziska Giffey, both of the social democrats, blocked this proposal. In their view, "other" was disparaging. Barley favoured "further" (German: weiteres) while Giffey preferred "inter/diverse" (German: inter/divers).

The government draft, hashed out within the grand coalition, settled on a third gender entry called German: divers, as well as an option for an empty gender entry.

== Trivia ==
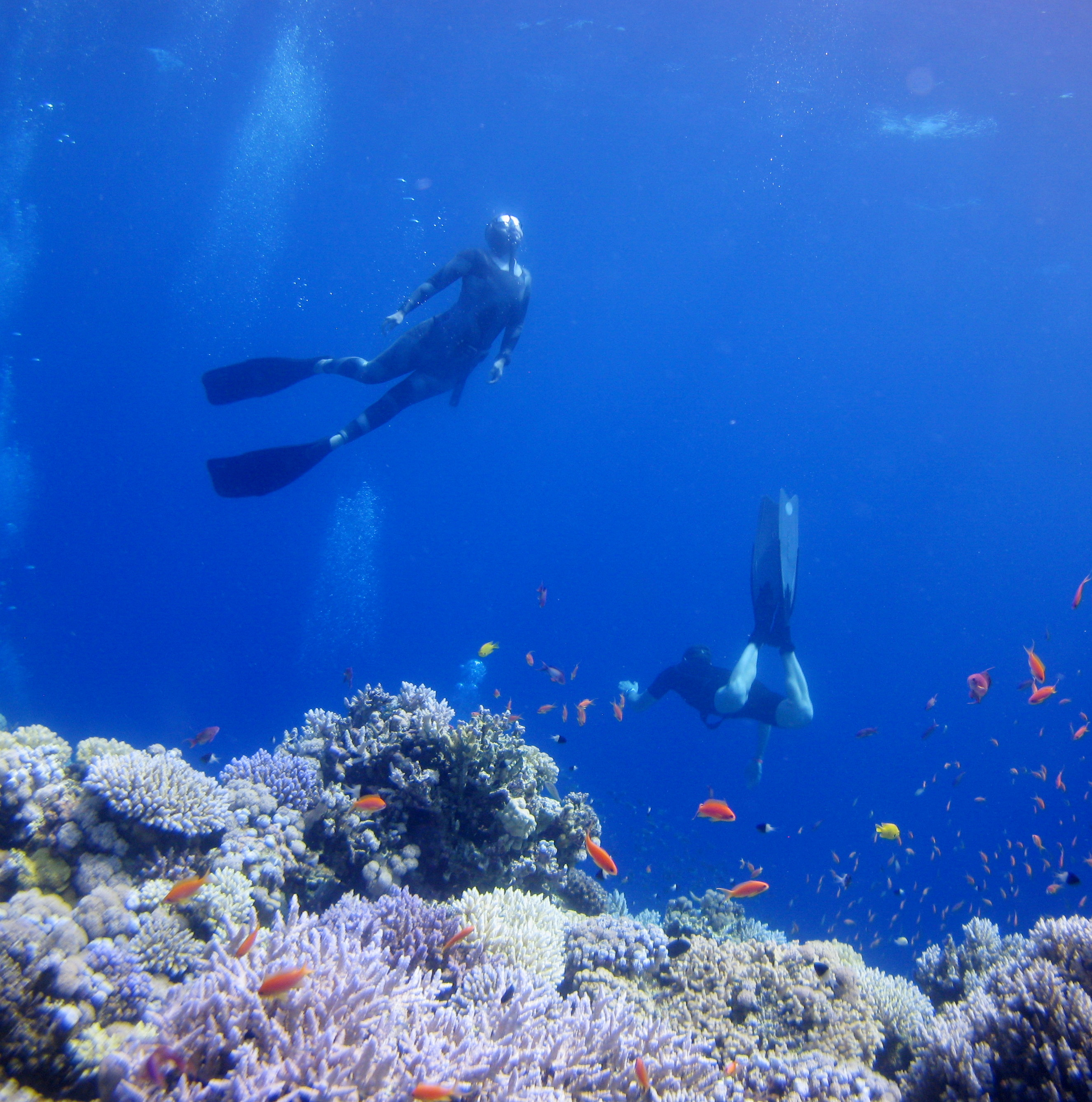
Divers

In 2021, an online form created to book COVID-19 vaccination appointments around Cologne and Dusseldorf mistakenly offered users to declare their gender as German: Taucher, a literal translation of the English "divers" as in "people who dive". The booking form was made by the regional public doctors' association German: Kassenärztliche Vereinigung Nordrhein.

== See also ==
- Legal recognition of intersex people
- Legal recognition of non-binary gender
- Intersex rights in Germany
- Transgender rights in Germany
- Transsexuals Act
- Self-Determination Act
