= Federal Institute of Public Health =

German federal government institute

Coordinates: 50.9445°N 6.8977°E

Federal Institute of Public Health (BIÖG)
- Bundesinstitut für Öffentliche Gesundheit

Agency overview
- Formed: 20 July 1967
- Preceding agency: Federal Centre for Health Education (BZgA)
- Jurisdiction: Government of Germany
- Headquarters: Cologne, Germany
- Employees: 151 (2025)
- Annual budget: €21.7 million (2026)
- Parent department: Federal Ministry of Health
- Website: bioeg.de

The Federal Institute of Public Health (German: Bundesinstitut für Öffentliche Gesundheit; BIÖG) is a federal authority within the portfolio of the German Federal Ministry of Health. The Authority has its headquarters in Cologne, Germany. The BIÖG was founded in 1967 as Federal Centre for Health Education (BZgA) and was renamed 2025 in Federal Institute of Public Health (BIÖG).

== Tasks ==
The BIÖG has the task of promoting the willingness of citizens to act responsibly to meet their health needs and to use the health care system properly. The main focuses of the BIÖG are AIDS prevention, sex education, drug abuse prevention for both legal and illegal drugs, child and youth health, healthy eating and organ donation. In addition, the BIÖG performs studies and investigations in order to improve their educational work. The studies are published regularly.

The tasks of the BIÖG also include:

- Development of guidelines and principles for the content and the methods of practical health education
- Education and training of people in the field of health education and information
- Coordination of health information and health education in the federal territory
- Cooperation with foreign countries in these fields

In 2023, the German government announced the creation of a new institute, the Federal Institute for Prevention and Education in Medicine, into which the BZgA was expected to be integrated. This was projected to complete by January 2025.

== Campaigns and initiatives ==
=== Liebesleben ===
Liebesleben (English: Love Life) is a nationwide sexual health information campaign launched by the German Federal Institute of Public Health (BIÖG). It focuses particularly on topics related to love and sex that concern teenagers and young adults. These include sexually transmitted infections (in particular HIV/AIDS), romantic relationships, mental health, sexual orientation, gender identity, and protection against Conversion therapy. The initiative has been running since 2016.
