= Fundamental rights in the German Constitution =

Set of rights guaranteed to everyone in Germany

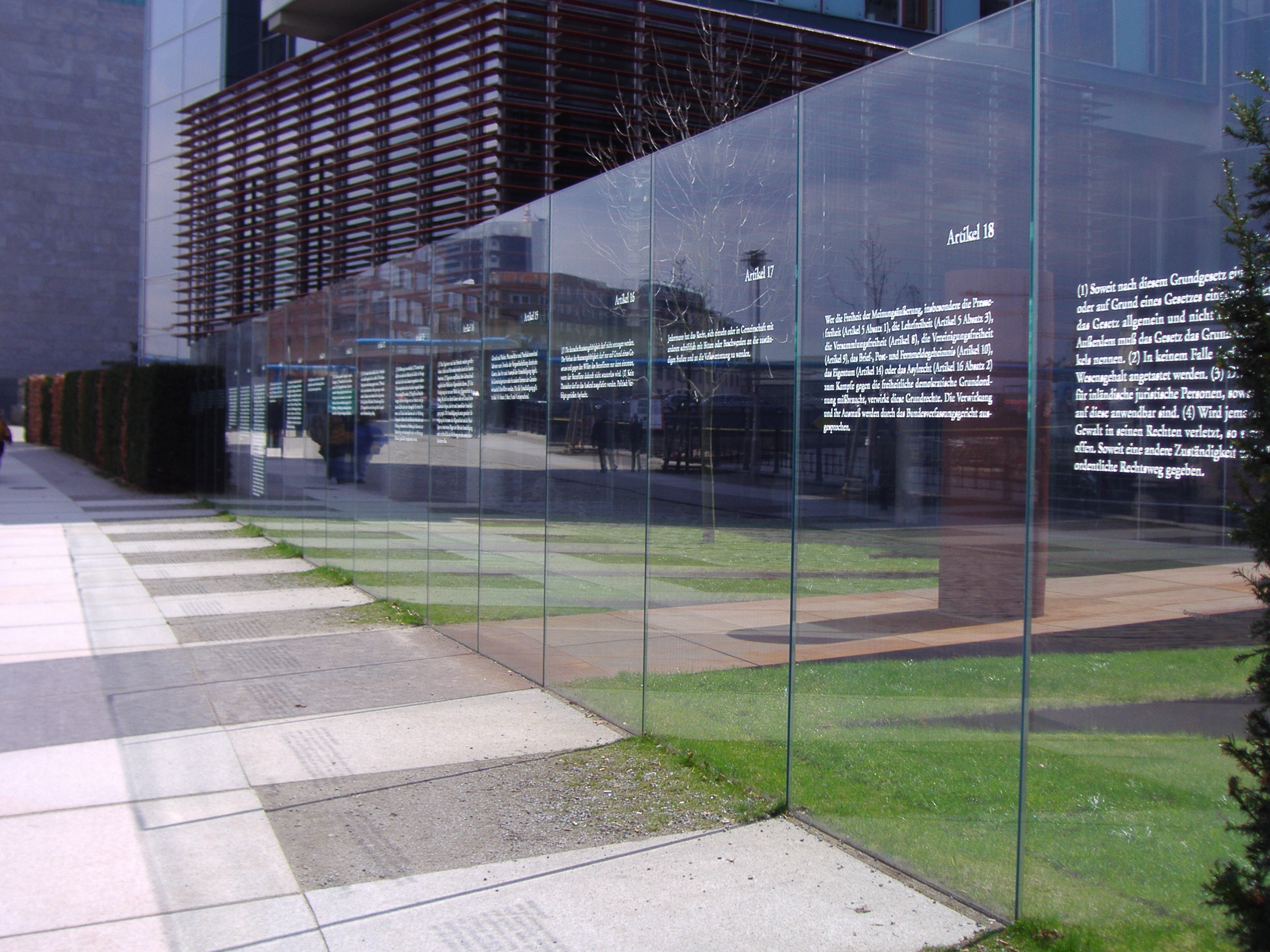
The Grundrechte at Jakob Kaiser House, Berlin

Fundamental Rights in the Federal Republic of Germany (German: Grundrechte) are a set of rights guaranteed to everyone in Germany and partially to German people only through their Federal Constitution, the Grundgesetz and the constitutions of some of the States of Germany. In the Federal Constitution, the majority of the Grundrechte are contained in the first title, Articles 1 to 19 of the Grundgesetz (GG). These rights have constitutional status, binding each of the country's constitutional institutions. In the event that these rights are violated and a remedy is denied by other courts, the constitution provides for an appeal to the Federal Constitutional Court (Bundesverfassungsgericht) (Art. 93 Abs. I Nr. 4a GG).

According to this article, the Constitutional Court is entitled to hear appeals concerning not just the Grundrechte contained in Arts. 1-19, but also Art. 20 Abs. I, 33, 38, 101, 103 and 104. These rights are also therefore referred to as grundrechtsgleiche Rechte (rights equal to fundamental rights) or colloquially also as fundamental rights.

== Limitation ==
In addition to the Grundrechte, the Basic Law guarantees a number of other public rights, such as the uniform application of federal law between states (Art.28 (2)(1) GG) and the independence of the church (Art. 137 (3) of the Weimar Constitution and Art. 140 GG). These however are not Grundrechte as they are not contained under the first title of the constitution or in the appeal mechanism to the Federal Constitutional Court.

There are also lists of fundamental rights in the majority of state constitutions, which vary slightly from one another but are never capable of ruling out a Grundrecht. Landesrechte (i.e. rights guaranteed by state constitutions) which mirror Bundesrechte (those guaranteed by the Federal Constitution) are therefore disregarded in favour of the Bundesrechte. Many state constitutions of the Old states of Germany which were written after the Federal Basic Law do not contain their own lists of fundamental rights at all; the New states of Germany, however, do contain lists of fundamental rights, which incorporate both the civil and political rights of the Federal Basic Law and the social rights guaranteed by the erstwhile Constitution of the German Democratic Republic.

== Applicability ==
All the Grundrechte have a binding effect on each of the constitutional institutions, regardless of whether it is the executive, legislature or judiciary, federally or in one of the states (Länder). It is also irrelevant whether the state was directly or indirectly involved in the violation, whether it acted through public or private law or through legal entities under private law; public bodies are always bound by the Grundrechte (Art. 1(3) GG).

Rights under the German constitution can also be divided between universal fundamental rights (Jedermann-Grundrechte), which are afforded to everyone, and German fundamental rights (Staatsbürgerrechte or Deutschenrechte), to which only Germans are entitled. The reason for the separation is largely due to democratic will and the protection of sovereignty.

The Deutsche Grundrechte include the rights to freedom of assembly (Art. 8 GG), freedom of association (Art. 9 GG), freedom of abode (Art. 11 GG) and freedom to work (Art. 12 GG), as well as the right to vote and stand for public office. The restriction of these rights only to Germans does not just refer to German citizenship, German status being regulated by Art. 116 GG. While some Grundrechte apply only to Germans, there are some on which only non-Germans can rely, e.g. right to asylum (art. 16a GG).

Some of the Deutsche Grundrechte also apply for other citizens of the European Union with or without residence in Germany regarding their rights to move freely within Germany or to work. Nevertheless it is disputed whether all German fundamental rights apply to them in light of the prohibition of discrimination contained in Art. 18 (1) of the TFEU treaty. This article requires that all citizens of the EU are given equal status and equality of protection under all legal systems in the community.

According to their contents, the Grundrechte can also be divided into freedom rights and equality rights.

== Protection ==
Although the Grundgesetz might be changed with a 2/3 majority of the Bundestag, the original Fundamental Rights are protected by article 19. Modification on the first 18 articles (and article 19) is only allowed as long as the original essential contents are not removed. Where, as has happened in several instances, articles have been amended to provide for rights not spelled out in the original Basic Law, these extended rights are not protected as Fundamental Rights.
