= LGBTQ rights in Germany =

- Location of Germany (dark green) – in Europe (light green & dark grey) – in the European Union (light green) – [Legend]
- Legal status: Decriminalised since 1968 in East Germany and since 1969 in West Germany; Equal age of consent since 1988 in East Germany and since 1994 in unified Germany
- Gender identity: Transgender people are allowed to change legal gender since 1980; Effective from 1 November 2024 individuals over 18 can change gender by self-determination
- Military: LGBTQ+ people allowed to serve
- Discrimination protections: Sexual orientation and gender identity protection nationwide; some protections vary by region (see below)

Family rights
- Recognition of relationships: Same-sex marriage since 2017
- Adoption: Full adoption rights since 2017

Lesbian, gay, bisexual, transgender, and queer (LGBTQ) rights in Germany rank among the highest in the world, having evolved significantly over the course of the last several decades. During the 1920s and the early 1930s, lesbian and gay people in Berlin were generally tolerated by society and many bars and clubs specifically pertaining to gay men were opened. Although same-sex sexual activity between men was already made illegal under Paragraph 175 by the German Empire in 1871, Nazi Germany extended these laws during World War II, which resulted in the persecution and deaths of thousands of homosexual citizens. Same-sex sexual activity between men was decriminalized in both East and West Germany in 1968 and 1969, respectively.

Same-sex marriage has been legal since 1 October 2017, after the Bundestag passed legislation giving same-sex couples full marital and adoption rights on 30 June 2017. Prior to that, registered partnerships were available to same-sex couples, having been legalised in 2001. These partnerships provided most though not all of the same rights as marriages, and they ceased to be available after the introduction of same-sex marriage. Same-sex stepchild adoption first became legal in 2005 and was expanded in 2013 to allow someone in a same-sex relationship to adopt a child already adopted by their partner.

Discrimination protections on the basis of sexual orientation and gender identity vary across Germany, but discrimination in employment and the provision of goods and services is banned nationwide. Transgender people have been allowed to change their legal gender since 1980. Effective from 1 November 2024 individuals over 18 can change gender by self-determination. The law initially required them to undergo surgical alteration of their genitals in order to have key identity documents changed. This has since been declared unconstitutional. In May 2020, Germany became the fifth nation in the world to enact a nationwide ban on conversion therapy for minors.

Despite the biggest party being socially conservative on the issues of LGBTQ rights (CDU/CSU), Germany has frequently been seen as one of the most gay-friendly countries in the world. Recent polls have indicated that a large majority of Germans support same-sex marriage. Another poll, conducted by the Pew Research Center, in 2013 indicated that 87% of Germans believed that homosexuality should be accepted by society, which was the second highest score in the 39 countries polled, following Spain (88%). Berlin has been referred to by publications as one of the most gay-friendly cities in the world. Former Mayor of Berlin Klaus Wowereit is one of the most famous openly gay men in Germany, next to the former Mayor of Hamburg, Ole von Beust, the former Federal Minister of Health, Jens Spahn, the deceased former Minister for Foreign Affairs and Vice-Chancellor, Guido Westerwelle, the former Federal Ministry of the Environment, Barbara Hendricks, comedians Hape Kerkeling, and Hella von Sinnen, or political journalist Anne Will. Founded in 1981, the Akademie Waldschlösschen, an adult education conference center near Göttingen, has developed into a national networking hub for LGBTI teachers, lawyers, clergy, gay fathers and gay and lesbian student groups at German universities. Other famous gay rights activists include Rosa von Praunheim, whose film It Is Not the Homosexual Who Is Perverse, But the Society in Which He Lives (1971) triggered the modern gay liberation movement in Germany.

== History of laws regarding same-sex sexual activity ==
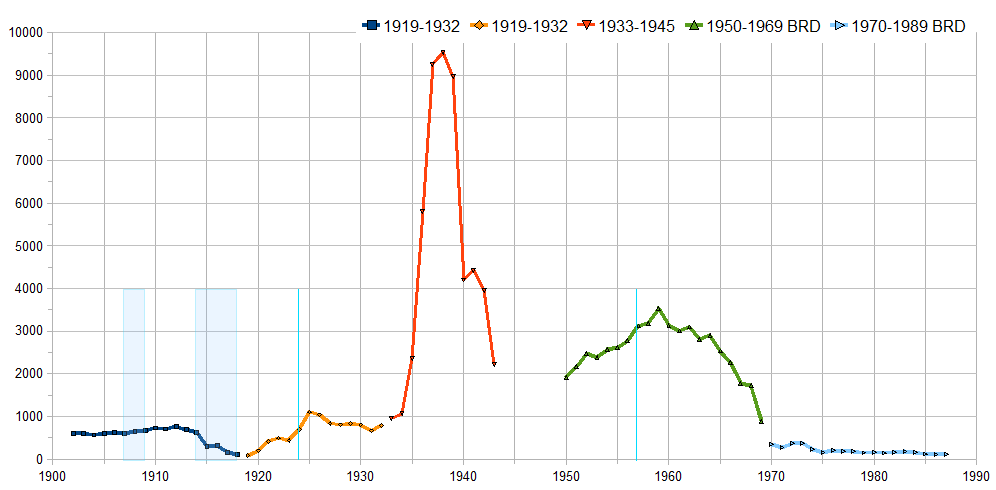
Graph of convictions under Paragraph 175. Spike occurs during Nazi era, and dropoff after partial repeal in 1969.

Homosexuality was punishable by death in the Holy Roman Empire from 1532 until its dissolution in 1806 and from 1620 to 1794 in Prussia. The influence of the Napoleonic Code in the early 1800s sparked decriminalisations in much of Germany outside of Prussia. However, in 1871, the year the federal German Empire was formed, Paragraph 175 of the new Penal Code recriminalised homosexual acts. The first homosexual movement unsuccessfully campaigned for the repeal of the law both under the German Empire and in the Weimar Republic.

Under Nazism the persecution of homosexuals in Nazi Germany resulted in convictions multiplying by a factor of ten to about 8,000 per year. Penalties were severe, and 5,000–15,000 suspected offenders were interned in concentration camps, where most of them died. The Nazi persecution is considered the most severe persecution of homosexual men in history.

The Nazi additions were repealed in East Germany in 1950, but homosexual relations between men remained a crime until 1968. West Germany kept the more repressive version of the law, legalising male homosexual activity one year after East Germany, in 1969. The age of consent was equalized in East Germany at 14 years in 1989, and in unified Germany in 1994. It is now 14 years (16/18 in some circumstances) for female-female, male-male and female-male sexual activity.

=== East Germany (1949–1990) ===
East Germany inherited Paragraph 175. Communist gay activist Rudolf Klimmer, modelling himself on Magnus Hirschfeld and his Scientific-Humanitarian Committee, campaigned in 1954 to have the law repealed, but was unsuccessful. However, his work prevented any further convictions for homosexuality after 1957.

In the five years following the Uprising of 1953 in East Germany, the GDR Government instituted a program of "moral reform" to build a solid foundation for the new socialist republic in which masculinity and the traditional family were championed, while homosexuality, seen to contravene "healthy mores of the working people", continued to be prosecuted under Paragraph 175. Same sex activity was "alternatively viewed as a remnant of bourgeois decadence, a sign of moral weakness, and a threat to the social and political health of the nation".

In East Germany, Paragraph 175 ceased to be enforced from 1957 but remained on the books until 1968. Officially, homosexuality was decriminalized in East Germany in 1968.

According to historian Heidi Minning, attempts by lesbian and gay activists to establish a visible community were "thwarted at every turn by the GDR Government and the SED party". Minning writes: Police force was used on numerous occasions to break up or prevent public gay and lesbian events. Centralized censorship prevented the presentation of homosexuality in print and electronic media, as well as the import of such materials.

The Protestant Church provided more support than the state, allowing meeting spaces and printing facilities. Eduard Stapel was an important figure in the creation of meetings in Protestant Church spaces, in his case in Leipzig. In a 1994 interview, conducted and published by researcher Kurt Strake, Stapel emphasized the importance of these meetings as one of the first gathering spaces for the gay community in East Germany. Stapel mentioned attempts to create a community before the 1980s, but still considered the meetings in the church starting in 1982 as the most important.

On 11 August 1987, the East German Supreme Court affirmed that "homosexuality, just like heterosexuality, represents a variant of sexual behavior. Homosexual people do therefore not stand outside socialist society, and the civil rights are warranted to them exactly as to all other citizens".

In 1988, the German Hygiene Museum in Dresden commissioned the state-owned film studio, DEFA, to make the documentary film Die andere Liebe ("The Other Love"). It was the first DEFA film about homosexuality, and its aim was to convey official state acceptance. In 1989, the German Hygiene Museum also commissioned DEFA to make the GDR's only HIV/AIDS prevention documentary, Liebe ohne Angst ("Love Without Fear"). This did not focus on homosexuality directly but pointed out that AIDS was not a "gay disease."

In 1989, DEFA also produced the film Coming Out, directed by Heiner Carow, telling the story of an East German man coming to accept his homosexuality. Much of the film was shot in East Berlin gay bars. It was the only East German feature film about same-sex desire ever produced. It won a number of awards, including a Silver Bear and Teddy Award at the 40th Berlin International Film Festival, and awards at the National Feature Film Festival of the GDR.

Jürgen Lemke is considered one of the most prominent East German gay rights activists and has published a book on the subject (Gay Voices from East Germany, English edition published in 1991). Lemke claimed that the gay community was far more united in the GDR than it was in the West.

=== West Germany (1949–1990) ===
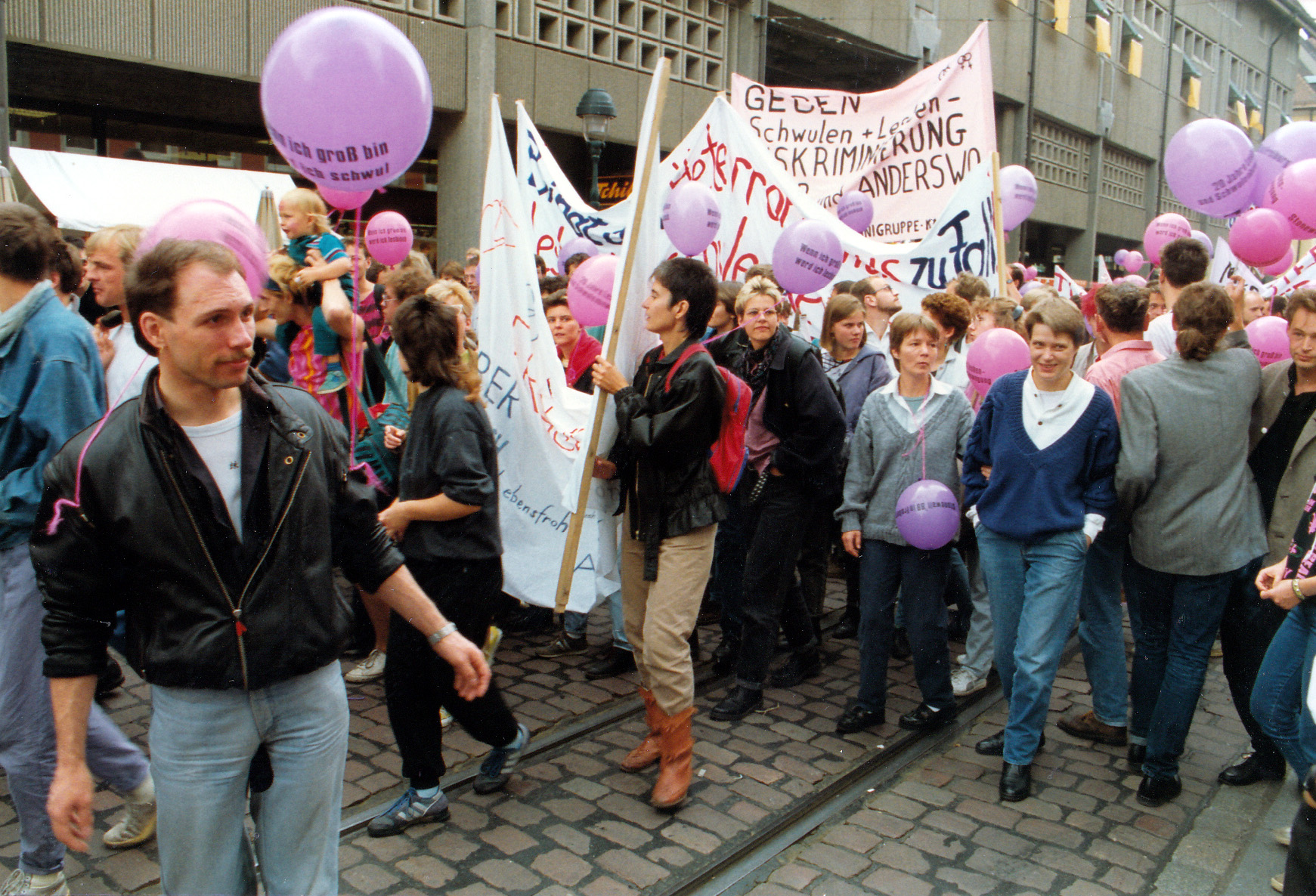
Christopher Street Day in Freiburg im Breisgau, 1989

West Germany inherited Paragraph 175, which remained on the books until 1969. However, as opposed to East Germany, the churches' influence in West Germany was very strong. Fundamentalist Protestants and the Roman Catholic Church were staunchly opposed to LGBT rights legislation.

The Frankfurt Homosexual Trials of 1950/51 constituted a significant chapter in the persecution of homosexual men within the Federal Republic of Germany, representing a continuity from the Nazi era while also occurring under the new administration of the Adenauer era. Primarily instigated by the Frankfurt public prosecutor's office, these trials were propelled forward with the aid of sex worker Otto Blankenstein, who served as a pivotal witness.

Amidst prevailing socially conservative sentiments, the German Christian Democratic Union, wielding considerable political influence in post-war West Germany, generally disregarded or actively opposed gay rights issues. Conversely, their frequent coalition partners, the Free Democratic Party, often espoused stronger advocacy for civil liberties. However, as a smaller political entity, the Free Democratic Party was often reticent to antagonize the more socially conservative factions within the larger Christian Democratic Union.

During the Cold War era, support for gay rights in Germany was generally restricted to the Free Democratic Party, the Social Democratic Party and, later in the 1980s, the Greens. At the national level, advancements in gay rights did not begin to happen until the end of the Cold War and the electoral success of the Social Democratic Party. For example, in 1990, the law was changed so that homosexuality and bisexuality were no longer grounds for being discriminated against in the military.

The first kiss between two men on German television was shown in Rosa von Praunheim's film It Is Not the Homosexual Who Is Perverse, But the Society in Which He Lives (1971). This film marks the beginning of the German modern gay liberation movement. In 1986, the popular soap opera Lindenstraße showed the first gay kiss in a German TV series. From then on, many other television shows followed this example. The creation of private TV stations in 1984 resulted in a stronger LGBT presence in the media by the end of the decade. The station RTL in particular was very gay-friendly and some TV stars had come out by then.

=== Annulment of convictions ===
In 2002, the German Government decided to overturn any convictions for homosexuality made during the Nazi period.

In May 2016, Justice Minister Heiko Maas announced that gay and bisexual men who were convicted of same-sex sexual activity after World War II would have their convictions overturned. Maas said the following in a statement:

We will never be able to eliminate completely these outrages by the state, but we want to rehabilitate the victims. The homosexual men who were convicted should no longer have to live with the taint of conviction.

In October 2016, the German Government announced the introduction of a draft law to pardon around 50,000 men for the prosecutions they endured due to their sexual orientation. On 22 March 2017, the Germany Cabinet officially approved the bill. The bill, which also includes compensation of €3,000 for each conviction, plus €1,500 for every year of jail time, then had to obtain parliamentary approval. On 22 June 2017, the Bundestag (German Parliament) unanimously passed the bill to implement the scheme to rehabilitate gay and bisexual men. The bill then went back to the Bundesrat for final approval, and was signed into law by German President Frank-Walter Steinmeier on 17 July 2017.

=== Compensation scheme ===
In September 2021, Germany implemented a compensation scheme for hundreds and possibly thousands of LGBT victims of the law criminalizing homosexual acts, which continued to apply in West Germany in its Nazi era version until 1969.

== Recognition of same-sex relationships ==
Same-sex couples have been legally recognized in Germany since 2001. That year, registered life partnerships (eingetragene Lebenspartnerschaft) were instituted, giving same-sex couples rights and obligations in areas such as inheritance, alimony, health insurance, immigration, hospital, jail visitations, and name change. Subsequently, the Constitutional Court repeatedly ruled in favor of same-sex couples in registered partnerships, requiring the Bundestag to make incremental changes to the partnership law. In one case, the European Court of Justice ruled that refusing a widow's pension to the same-sex partner of a deceased person is direct discrimination if the partnership was comparable to marriage (see also "same-sex unions in the European Union").

Even though a majority of the political parties in the Bundestag supported legalising same-sex marriage, attempts to follow through with the proposal were repeatedly blocked by CDU/CSU, the largest parliamentary party and the dominant party in the government coalitions since 2005. This changed on the final sitting day of the Bundestag before the 2017 summer break, when the junior party in the coalition, the Social Democratic Party, introduced a bill to legalise same-sex marriage and adoption which had previously passed the Bundesrat in September 2015. German Chancellor Angela Merkel moderated her stance on the issue by allowing members of the CDU/CSU to follow their personal conscience rather than the party line, which freed up moderate members who had long been in favour of same-sex marriage to vote for it. On 30 June 2017, the SPD, Die Linke and the Greens as well as 75 members of the CDU/CSU formed a majority in the Bundestag to pass the bill by 393 votes to 226. The law came into effect three months after promulgation, on 1 October 2017.

The first same-sex weddings in Germany were celebrated on 1 October 2017. Berlin couple Karl Kreile and Bodo Mende, a couple for 38 years, were the first same-sex couple to exchange their vows under the new law and did so at the town hall of Schöneberg, Berlin.

In 2020, the Christian Democratic Union published a political video supporting same-sex marriage and families. In 2023, the Christian Social Union in Bavaria adopted a party platform supporting same-sex marriage. As of 2023, the Alternative for Germany remains the largest party opposed to same-sex marriage whilst being led by Alice Weidel, who herself is a lesbian.

Some religious groups and organisations formally bless same-sex marriages within Germany - for example all 20 lutheran, reformed and united churches in Evangelical Church in Germany, while others do not. In March 2023, it was reported that from 2026 within the Frankfurt region of Germany the Catholic church will perform same-sex blessings - that go against the policies of the Vatican. After the Synodal Path first German dioceses of Catholic Church in Germany started blessing ceremonies for same-sex couples in April 2023, for example Roman Catholic Diocese of Osnabrück or Roman Catholic Diocese of Essen. In April 2025, Roman Catholic bishop conference in Germany published a manual for blessing ceremonies for same-sex unions.

== Adoption and parenting ==
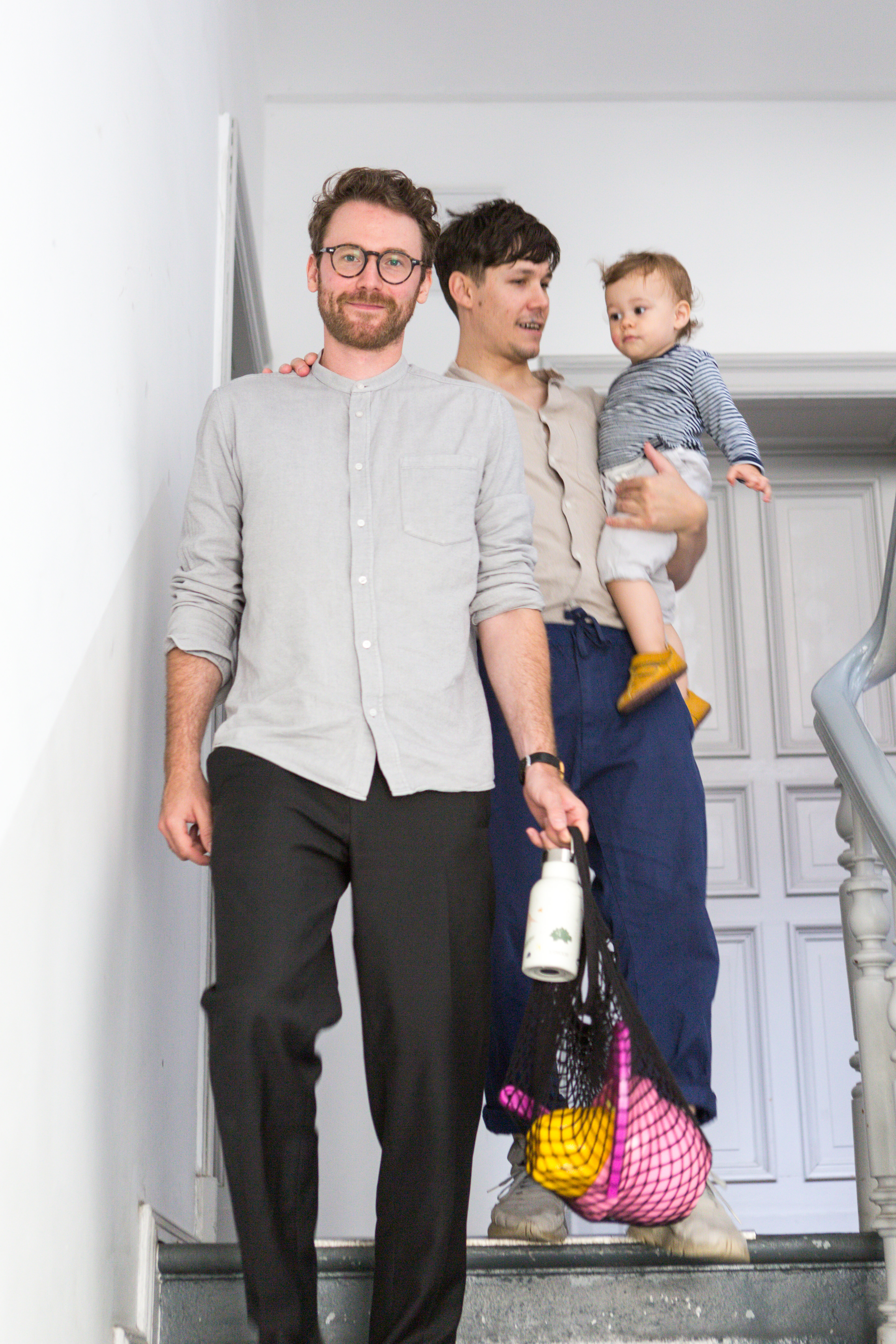
A German gay couple living in Berlin with their daughter

In 2004, the registered partnership law (originally passed in 2001) was amended, effective on 1 January 2005, to give registered same-sex couples limited adoption rights (stepchild adoption only) and reform previously cumbersome dissolution procedures with regard to division of property and alimony. In 2013, the Supreme Constitutional Court ruled that if one partner in a same-sex relationship has adopted a child, the other partner has the right to become the adoptive mother or father of that child as well; this is known as "successive adoption". The same-sex marriage law, passed in June 2017, gave same-sex couples full adoption rights. On 10 October 2017, a court in Berlin's Kreuzberg district approved the first application for joint adoption of a child by a same-sex couple.

There is no legal right to assisted reproduction procedures for lesbian couples, such as artificial insemination and in vitro fertilisation, but such practices are not explicitly banned either. The German Medical Association is against explicit legalisation and directs its members not to perform such procedures. Since this directive is not legally binding, however, sperm banks and doctors may work with lesbian clients if they wish. This makes it harder for German lesbian couples to have children than in some other countries, but it is becoming increasingly popular. If a married lesbian couple conceives a child via donor insemination, the non-biological parent is not automatically recognized on the child's birth certificate and must go through an adoption procedure. This is not the case for married heterosexual couples, where the non-biological father is automatically recognized as a legal parent. A bill initiated by Alliance 90/The Greens in June 2018 to rectify this inequality is pending in the Bundestag. In October 2018, the Federal Court of Justice (Bundesgerichtshof) in Karlsruhe ruled that, unlike heterosexual couples, the wife of the child's legal mother does not automatically become a parent, and that an adoption is necessary. This specific case involved a lesbian couple from Saxony, who had converted their civil partnership in mid-October 2017 into a marriage. At the beginning of November, their child was born via artificial insemination. When trying to record the birth, only the biological mother was allowed to register. The couple then unsuccessfully applied to the registry office to correct the birth record so that the non-biological mother could also be listed as the child's mother. The office rejected this request, whereupon the woman filed suit. A district court in Chemnitz initially ruled for the couple, but the Dresden Higher Regional Court overturned this decision in April 2018. Eventually, after another appeal, the Federal Court of Justice ruled against them. In its judgment, the Court referenced Paragraph 1592 of the Bürgerliches Gesetzbuch, which states that "the father of a child is the man who at the moment of birth is married to the child's mother". The Ministry of Justice has begun looking into legal reforms to grant automatic co-parent recognition for lesbian couples.

In May 2019, Federal Minister of Family Affairs, Senior Citizens, Women and Youth Franziska Giffey recommended that teachers use forms that are gender-neutral, which no longer use "mother and father" but instead "parent 1 and parent 2".

== Military and police services ==
LGBT people are permitted to serve openly in the German Armed Forces.

The Bundeswehr maintained a "glass ceiling" policy that effectively banned homosexuals from becoming officers until 2000. First Lieutenant Winfried Stecher, an army officer demoted for his homosexuality, had filed a lawsuit against former Defense Minister Rudolf Scharping. Scharping vowed to fight the claim in court, claiming that homosexuality "raises serious doubts about suitability and excludes employment in all functions pertaining to leadership". However, before the case went to trial, the Defense Ministry reversed the policy. While the German Government declined to issue an official explanation for the reversal, it was widely believed that Scharping was overruled by former Chancellor Gerhard Schröder and former Vice-Chancellor Joschka Fischer. Nowadays, according to general military orders given in the year 2000, tolerance towards all sexual orientations is considered to be part of the duty of military personnel. Sexual relationships and acts amongst soldiers outside service times, regardless of the sexual orientation, are defined as "irrelevant", regardless of the rank and function of the soldier(s) involved, while harassment or the abuse of functions is considered a transgression, as well as the performance of sexual acts in active service. Transgender persons may also serve openly in the German Armed Forces.

In September 2020, the German Government issued a formal apology for past anti-gay discrimination in the military. In November 2020, the German Cabinet approved legislation providing compensation to LGBT servicepeople for past discrimination and harassment. In March, 2021, the bill was discussed in the Lower Chamber of Parliament (Bundestag), where it was supported by a majority - with some minor amendments suggested. On May 20, 2021, the bill got a supporting vote in the Bundestag.

In March 2021, it was reported that both transgender and intersex individuals can now serve openly within both the military and police in Germany.

== Discrimination protections ==
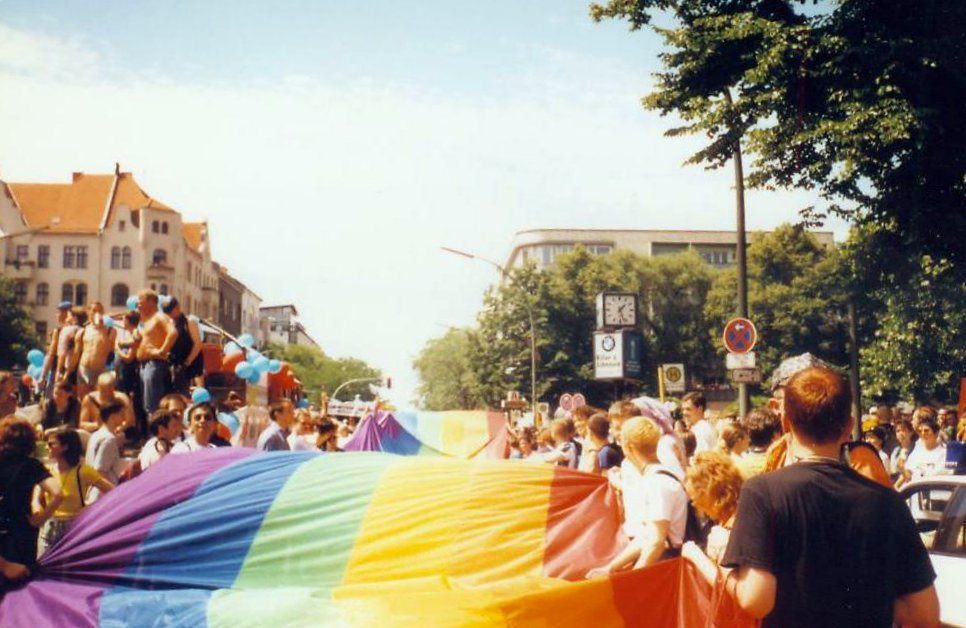
Berlin Pride in 1997

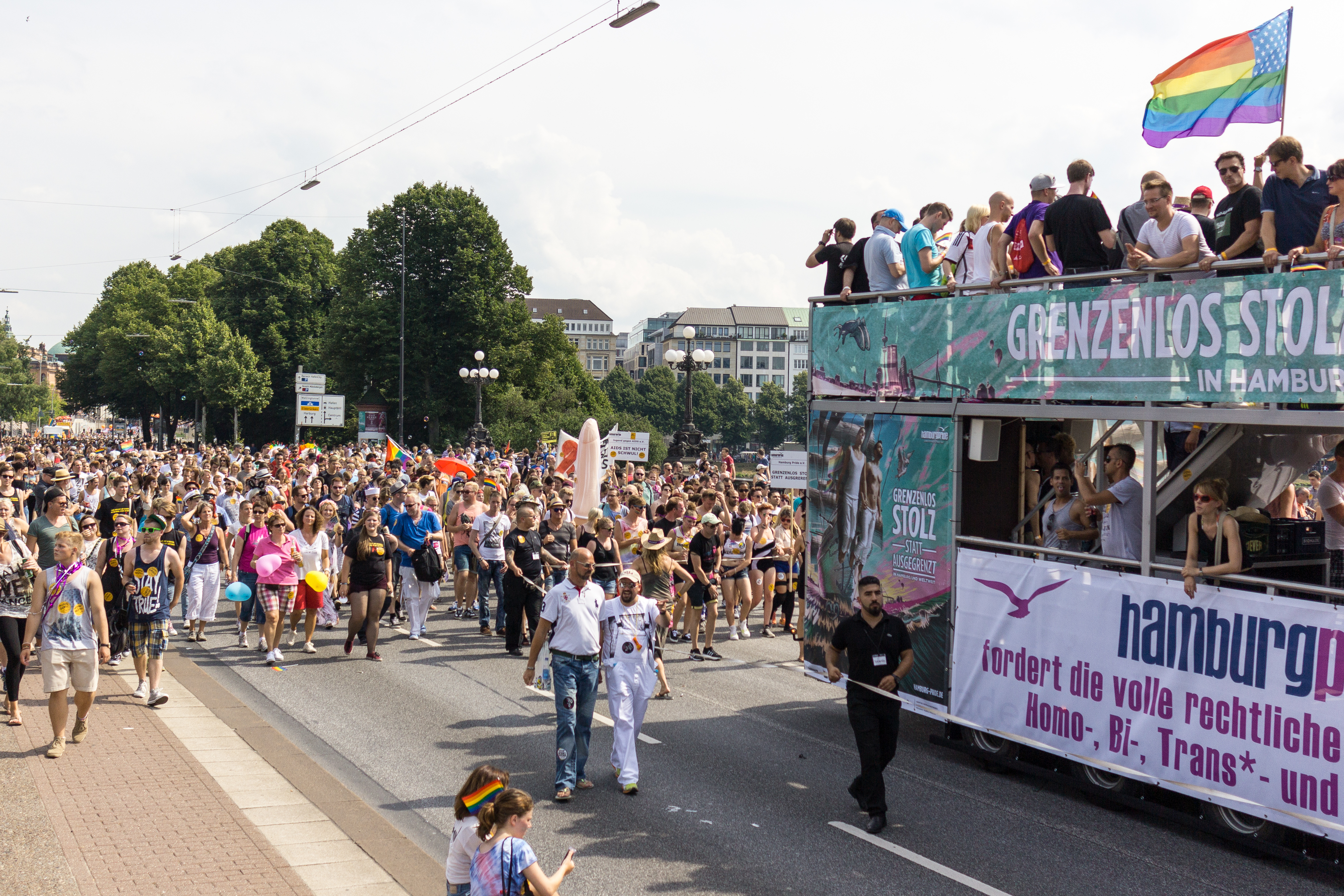
Hamburg Pride in 2014

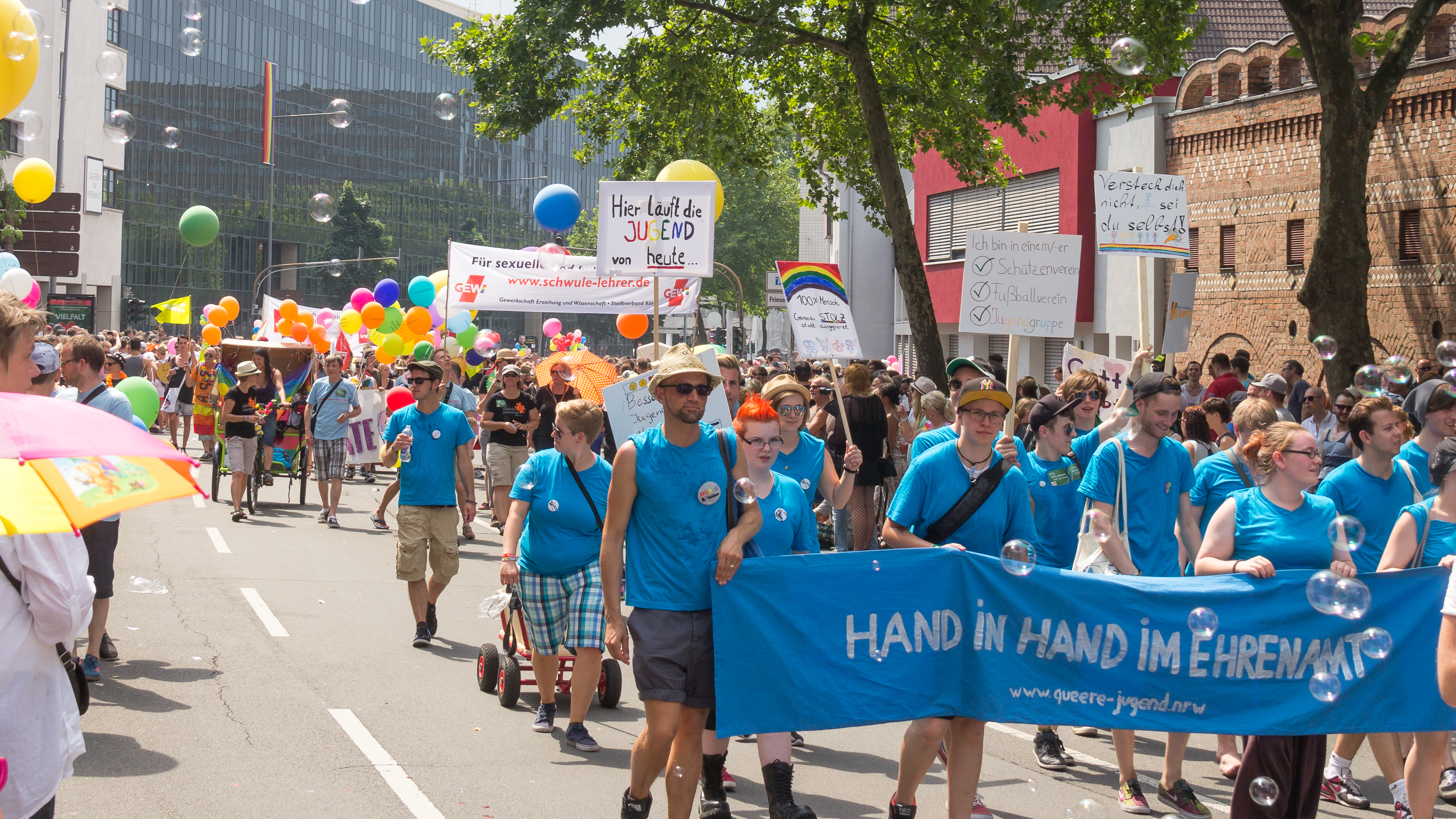
The 2015 edition of Cologne Pride

In the fields of employment, goods and services, education and health services, discrimination on the basis of sexual orientation or gender identity is illegal throughout Germany. As a signatory to the Treaty of Amsterdam, Germany was required to amend its national anti-discrimination laws to include, among others, sexual orientation. It failed to do so for six years, due to discussions about the scope of the proposed laws. Some of the proposals were debated because they actually surpassed the requirements of the Treaty of Amsterdam (namely, extending discrimination protection for all grounds of discrimination to the provision of goods and services); the final version of the law, however, was criticised as not fully complying with some parts of the Treaty, especially with respect to the specifications about the termination of work contracts through labor courts. The Bundestag finally passed the General Act on Equal Treatment (German: Allgemeines Gleichbehandlungsgesetz) on 29 June 2006; the Bundesrat voted on it without discussion on 7 July 2006. Having come into force on 18 August 2006, the law bans discrimination based on sexual orientation and gender identity in employment, education, health services and the provision of goods and services.

Some state constitutions have anti-discrimination laws that include sexual orientation and gender identity, including the constitutions of Berlin (since 1995), Brandenburg (since 1992), Bremen (since 2001), Saarland (since 2011) and Thuringia (since 1993), and Saxony-Anhalt in the public sector since 1997. Article 10(2) of the Berlin Constitution reads as follows:

No one may be prejudiced or favoured because of sex, birth, race, language, national or social origin, faith, religious or political opinions or sexual orientation.

Hate speech on the basis of sexual orientation and gender identity is banned in Germany. German law prohibits incitement to hatred based on membership to a certain social or ethnic group. According to the Ministry of the Interior, 245 cases of homophobic and transphobic attacks occurred in the first half of 2019, compared to 351 recorded in all of 2018.

=== Basic Law amendment ===
In 1994, although a majority in the Joint Constitutional Commission of the Bundestag and Bundesrat voted in favor of the inclusion of a prohibition on discrimination based on sexual identity in the Basic Law (Grundgesetz), the required two-thirds majority was not achieved.

In June 2018, the states of Berlin, Brandenburg, Bremen, Hamburg, Rhineland-Palatinate and Thuringia submitted a draft bill to the Bundesrat to amend article 3 of the Basic Law to add the characteristics "sexual and gender identity". In July, the draft proposal failed after the state of Berlin requested that it be rejected, as it became clear that the two-thirds majority would not be achieved.

In May 2019, Alliance 90/The Greens, the Free Democratic Party and The Left proposed a joint legislative initiative to amend Article 3 of the Basic Law to ban discrimination on grounds of "sexual identity" (sexuelle Identität). In November 2019, the Christian Democratic Union expressed support for the initiative.

== Transgender and intersex rights ==
Since 1980, the Transsexuals Act has stated that transgender persons may change their legal sex following genital surgery and sterilization. In January 2011, the Federal Constitutional Court ruled that these two requirements were unconstitutional.

In May 2019, the Ministry of Justice and the Ministry of the Interior presented a draft bill to reform the law. It was criticized by LGBT groups for failing to adopt a self-determination model and still requiring transgender people to go to court before a legal gender change. In addition, it would introduce the concept of "spousal veto", and requires a three-year waiting period before the applicant can reapply to change gender after a spousal veto or a negative court decision.

In 2019, the German Society for Transidentity and Intersexuality estimates the number of transgender and intersex people in Germany at between 210,000 and 500,000 people.

Since 2013, German law has allowed children born with atypical sexual anatomy to have their gender left blank instead of being categorised as male (männlich) or female (weiblich). The Swiss activist group Zwischengeschlecht came out in support of the change, saying "if a child's anatomy does not, in the view of physicians, conform to the category of male or the category of female, there is no option but to withhold the male or female labels given to all other children".

In November 2017, the Federal Constitutional Court (Bundesverfassungsgericht) ruled that civil status law must allow a third gender option, meaning that intersex people would have another option besides being listed as female or male or having a blank gender entry. A government proposal on the matter was presented in August 2018. Intersex individuals would be able to register themselves as divers (miscellaneous) on official documents. The resulting Third Gender Act was approved by the Bundestag in December 2018, and took effect on 1 January 2019. The divers option is available for such documents as birth certificates, passports and driver's licenses; however, intersex people are required to receive a doctor's statement or medical certification confirming their intersex status, which was criticized by LGBT groups. Additionally, parents are able to use the divers category for newborns with unclear sex traits. In April 2019, the Ministry of the Interior clarified that the divers option is applicable to intersex people only, not transgender people.

In August 2023, the Cabinet approved the Self-Determination Act which the German government had proposed the previous year. Any adult—whether transgender, intersex or nonbinary—would have to give three months' notice that they are changing their first name and gender.

In April 2024, the bill passed the Parliament of Germany on gender self-determination by a vote of 374–251. The law went into effect on 1 November 2024.

== Conversion therapy ==
Conversion therapy has a negative effect on the lives of LGBT people, and can lead to low self-esteem, depression and suicide ideation. It is opposed by every medical organisation in Germany.

In 2008, the German Government declared itself completely opposed to the pseudoscientific practice. In 2013, Alliance 90/The Greens introduced a draft bill to the Bundestag to ban conversion therapy on minors, but it was never voted on. A petition calling on the Health Ministry to ban the practice was launched in July 2018, and had collected about 60,000 signatures by mid-August 2018.

In February 2019, openly gay Health Minister Jens Spahn stated that he wanted conversion therapy for both minors and adults to be made illegal, calling it "a form of assault". Spahn said he hoped to work together with Justice Minister Katarina Barley for a law to ban conversion therapy, that he hoped would be approved by the autumn of 2019. In April 2019, after an online petition on the issue started by international LGBT organisation All Out collected around 110,000 signatures, Spahn called for a commission to draft proposals on how exactly such a ban can be introduced. The panel would then present its final report in autumn. The commission met in May and June for two full-day workshops. Likewise, the Ministry of Health invited politicians, scientists and those affected, as well as institutions from abroad who have already gained experience with legal prohibitions, to participate in the exchange. In June, Spahn presented in a press conference the results of two scientific reports that denounced conversion therapy and called for a legal ban. In early November 2019, Spahn submitted a draft bill that would ban the use of conversion therapy on minors and punish those coercing, deceiving and threatening someone of any age into the practice. On 18 December, the Cabinet gave its approval to the draft bill. Conversion therapy on adults would also be banned, provided there was a "lack of will power" such as coercion, threats, deceit or misapprehension. The ban would also be in effect for psychotherapeutic and pastoral conversations, but only if "the conversational partner purposefully tries to influence one's sexual orientation". People charged with illegally performing conversion therapy may face up to one year in prison. Offering, promoting and referring to conversion therapy in case of minors would also be deemed illegal and may carry a fine of €30,000. Both people performing the therapies and legal guardians "grossly violating their duty of care" may be charged. The legislation was approved by the Bundestag on 7 May 2020 with support from all political parties except the AfD.

There was also an initiative of several federal states for a ban on conversion therapy. The states of Hesse, Berlin, Bremen, Saarland and Schleswig-Holstein tabled a joint motion in the Bundesrat, which was presented in plenary on 12 April 2019. The states of Saxony, Saxony-Anhalt and Thuringia agreed to the motion, while Bavaria expressed potential support but with some modifications. The motion was to be voted on in plenary in the Bundesrat in May, but was later postponed. Another bill to ban conversion therapy for minors and a motion with numerous measures to educate and support victims of such practices was presented by the Green parliamentary group in the Bundestag in March 2019.

== Blood donation ==
In Germany, as in many other countries, men who have sex with men (MSM) were previously not allowed to donate blood. In June 2016, German health ministers announced that the MSM ban would be lifted, replacing it with a one-year deferral period. The proposal to lift the ban was championed by Saarland Health Minister Monika Bachmann. Since summer 2017, gay and bisexual men have been allowed to donate blood following a year of abstinence from sex. Since September 2021, gay and bisexual men have been allowed to donate blood following four months of abstinence from sex.

Bone marrow donation has been allowed since December 2014.

=== Individual risk based assessment ===
In June 2021, Reuters reported that Germany plans to implement an "individual risk based assessment" (similar format to the UK, Italy and Spain) blood donations that replaces the current one-year deferral period policy since 2017. It is not clear yet on when it will go into effect. From 1 April 2023, the updated "individual risk based assessment" blood donation policy went into effect throughout Germany.

== Openly gay and lesbian politicians ==
There are several prominent German politicians who are openly gay. Among them are

- former Berlin Mayor Klaus Wowereit (having outed himself with the famous words "Ich bin schwul – und das ist auch gut so!" ["I am gay – and that's a good thing!"]) and Johannes Kahrs, Michael Roth, Takis Mehmet Ali, Johannes Arlt, Karl-Heinz Brunner, Lars Castellucci, Falko Droßmann, Timon Gremmels, Carlos Kasper, Kevin Kühnert, Dorothee Martin, Matthias Miersch, Jan Plobner and Helga Schuchardt (from the SPD);
- Volker Beck, Andreas Audretsch, Dirk Behrendt, Birgitt Bender, Vasili Franco, Kai Gehring, Oliver Hildenbrand, Bruno Hönel, Anne Klein, Sven Lehmann, Jutta Oesterle-Schwerin, Josefine Paul, Ulle Schauws, Gerhard Schick, Marlene Schönberger, Emilia Fester, Anja Hajduk, Sibyll-Anka Klotz, Katja Meier, Herbert Rusche, Daniel Wesener and Wolfgang Wetzel (from The Greens);
- Karin Binder, Achim Kessler, Matthias Höhn, Sabine Jünger, Klaus Lederer, Carsten Schatz and Harald Petzold (from The Left)
- Jens Spahn (Federal Minister of Health in the Fourth Merkel cabinet), Ole von Beust, Jan Redmann, Uwe Schummer, Hendrik Streeck, Sepp Müller and Stefan Kaufmann (from the CDU);
- Bernd Fabritius and Wolfgang Stefinger (from the CSU);
- Michael Kauch, Jens Brandenburg, Jörg van Essen, Heiner Garg, Konstantin Kuhle, Thomas Sattelberger and Guido Westerwelle, who served as federal Foreign Minister from 2009 to 2013 and Vice-Chancellor from 2009 to 2011, (from the FDP).
- and Alice Weidel, Kay Gottschalk, and Tobias Ebenberger (from AfD);

In addition, former Hamburg Mayor Ole von Beust (CDU) did not deny anything when his father outed him but considered it a private matter; after leaving office he began talking about his homosexuality. In July 2007, Karin Wolff, the Minister of Education for Hesse, came out as a lesbian. In December 2013, Barbara Hendricks (SPD), the Federal Minister for the Environment in the Third Merkel Cabinet, came out as lesbian. In 2012, Michael Ebling (SPD) became the Mayor of Mainz. In 2013 and 2015, Sven Gerich (SPD) and Thomas Kufen (CDU) became the openly gay mayors of Wiesbaden and Essen, respectively.

== Positions of political parties ==
The Social Democratic Party (SPD), The Left (Die Linke), Alliance '90/The Greens (Bündnis 90/Die Grünen) and the liberal Free Democratic Party (FDP) support LGBT rights, including same-sex marriage. The Christian-conservative parties, the Christian Democratic Union and the Christian Social Union (CDU/CSU) support it since 2020 and 2023 respectively. The right-wing Alternative for Germany (AfD) is opposed to LGBT rights and opposes same-sex marriage, whilst being led by Alice Weidel, who is in favour of registered partnerships, being herself in a registered partnership with a woman.

== Queer Commissioner ==
In January 2022, the position of Federal Government Commissioner for the Acceptance of Sexual and Gender Diversity was established within the Federal Ministry of Family Affairs, Senior Citizens, Women and Youth. Sven Lehmann was the first appointee. Since May 2025, Sophie Koch hold this position.

== LGBTQ rights movement in Germany ==
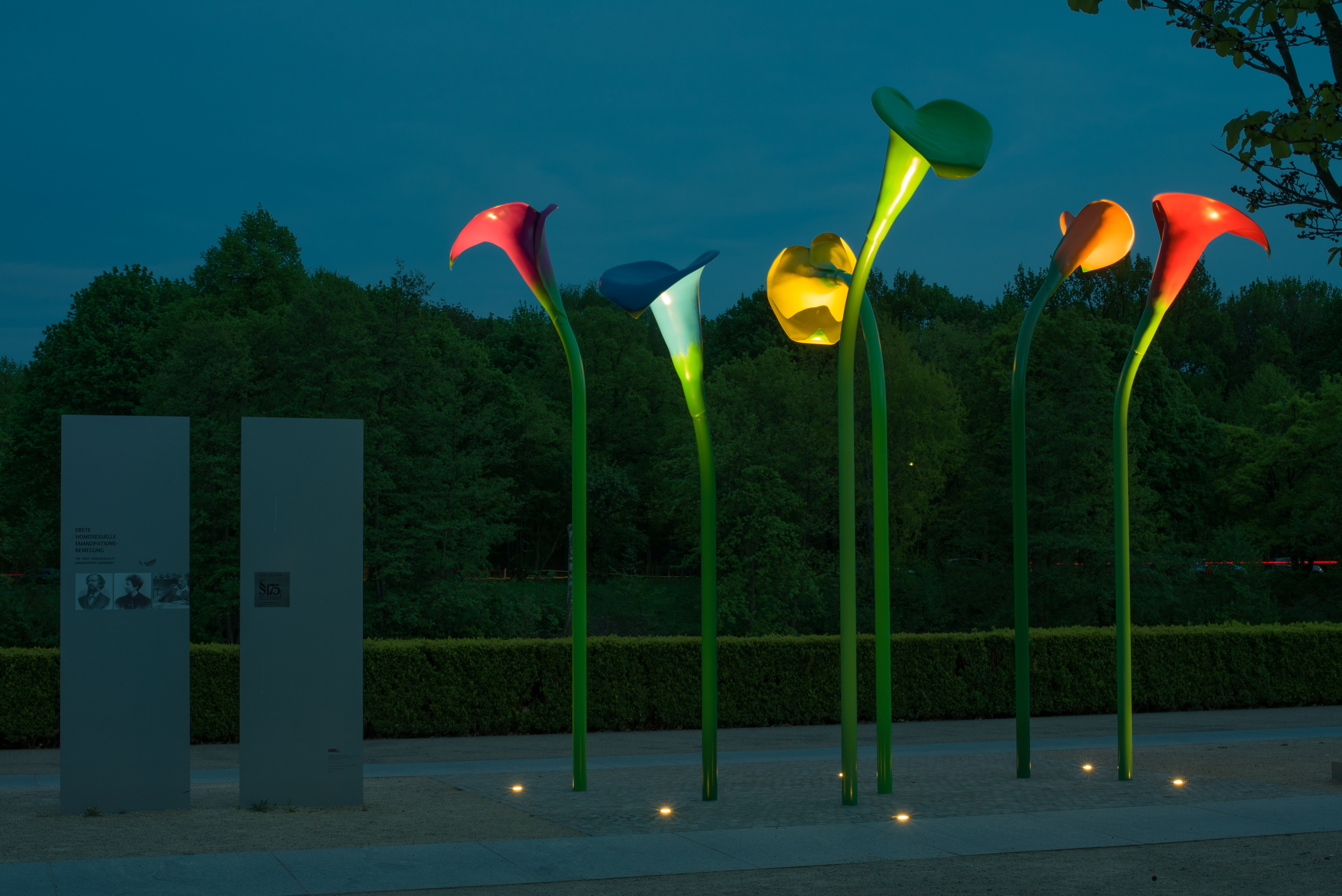
Memorial to the first homosexual emancipation movement in Berlin-Moabit, unveiled in 2017

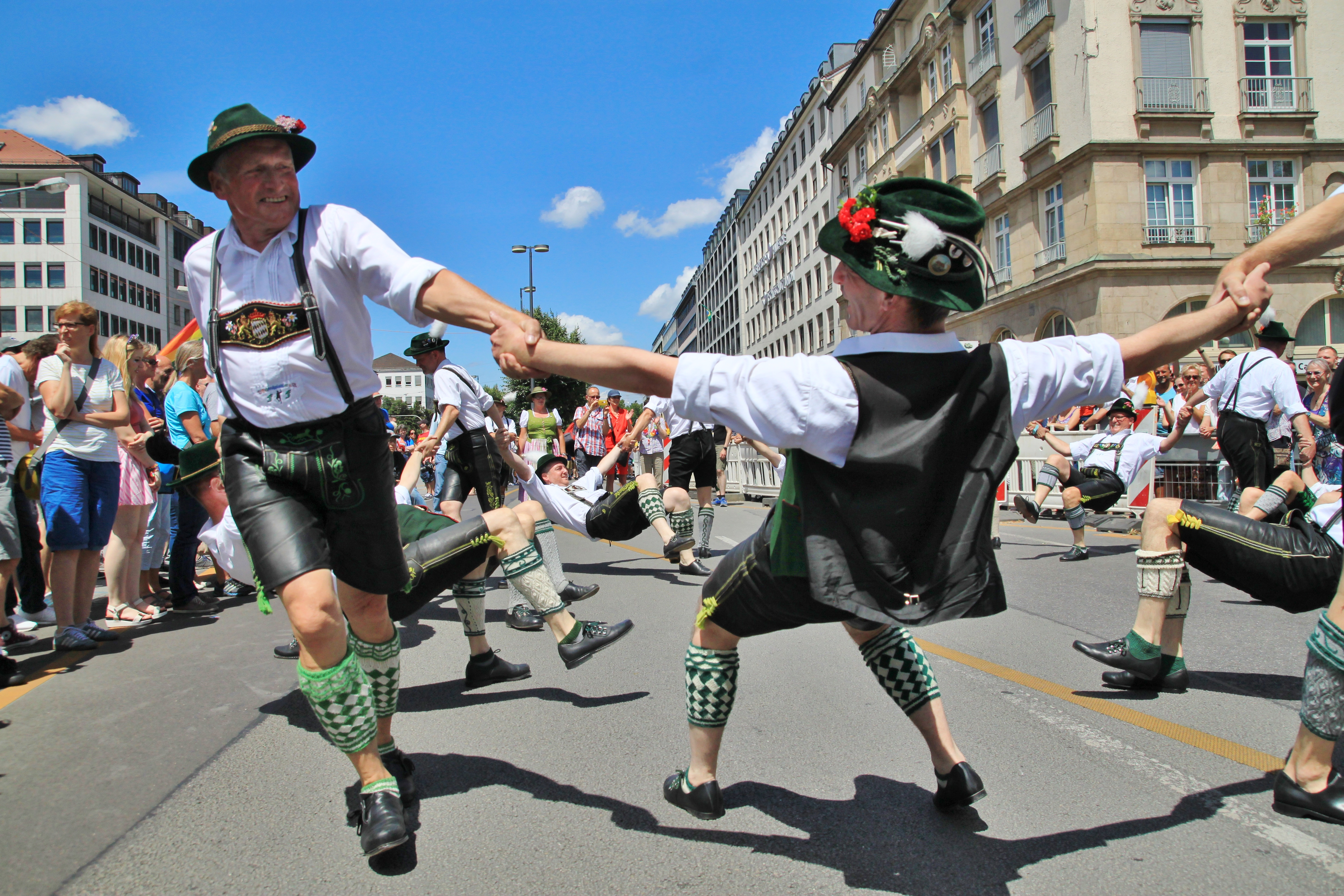
Participants at the 2016 Munich Pride parade dancing the traditional Bavarian Schuhplattler

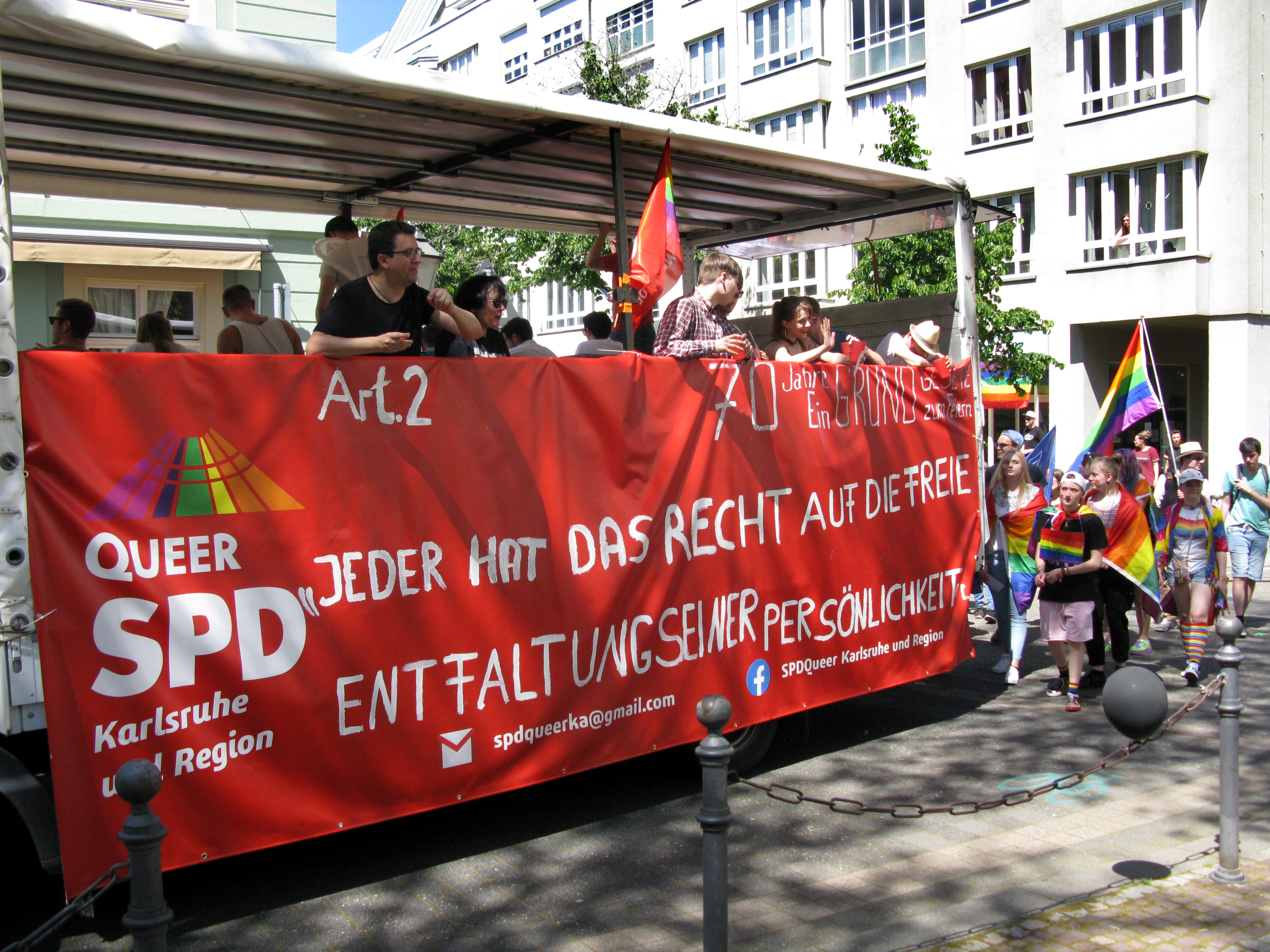
The Social Democratic Party at the 2019 Karlsruhe Pride parade

The first homosexual rights organization anywhere in the world was the Scientific-Humanitarian Committee, founded in 1897 in Berlin by Magnus Hirschfeld to campaign for the repeal of Paragraph 175. The first gay journal in the world Der Eigene ("The Self-Owning") began publishing in 1896. The journal continued publishing, with contributions from Benedict Friedlaender, Hanns Heinz Ewers, Erich Mühsam and more, until 1932. During the 1920s and 1930s, two major mass organisations arose, the Bund für Menschenrecht and the Deutscher Freundschaftsverband, many further special interest groups followed, dozens of LGBQ+-journals got published in huge numbers, among them the world's first lesbian journals like Die Freundin, Garçonne, and Die BIF and the first ever transgender magazine Das 3. Geschlecht. Hundreds of gay bars and clubs created a vital LGBTQ+ landscape in Berlin. With the rise to power of the Nazi Party, officials closed the bars, censored and banned gay publications and forced all organisations of the movement do dissolve themselves. During the Nazi era, gay, lesbian and trans people were persecuted by authorities and sometimes imprisoned in concentration camps.

Right after the second world war, some LGBT+-activists tried to establish a new movement, fighting the continuation of Nazi anti-gay laws. The first homosexual publication, Amicus-Briefbund, was founded in 1948, followed by other magazines in the early 1950s. Activists in Berlin, Hamburg and Frankfurt founded new organisations to follow up the powerful movement of the 1920s. Internal disputes and the repressive climate of the young Federal Republic, however, prevented a development as successful as that of the Weimar Republic, and by the end of the 1950s the movement had already failed and reached its end. It was not until the liberalization of the social and political climate in the second half of the 1960s that homophile organizations made a modest new start, but they were soon marginalized by the rise of the modern gay and lesbian movements.

The Homosexual Action West Berlin (Homosexuelle Aktion Westberlin, HAW) was founded on 15 August 1971. The group formed as a result of Rosa von Praunheim's film It Is Not the Homosexual Who Is Perverse, But the Society in Which He Lives. From 1973 onwards, the group organised annual meetings with several other gay groups including the Homosexuelle Aktion Göttingen, founded in 1972 in the city of Göttingen, and the Homosexuelle Frauengruppe Münster (Homosexual Women's Group Münster). The first gay and lesbian protest was organised in Münster on 29 April 1972. The groups campaigned for the repeal of Paragraph 175 and societal acceptance of LGBT people. In 1975, several members of HAW split from the group to form their own organisation, the Lesbisches Aktionszentrum Westberlin (Lesbian Action Center West Berlin). HAW began to lose influence from the late 1970s; founding the gay club SchwuZ (SchwulenZentrum) and eventually shutting down in the late 90s. The Federal Association of Homosexuality (Bundesverband Homosexualität) was established in Cologne in 1986 and dissolved in 1997. In 1990, the Lesbian and Gay Federation in Germany (LSVD, Lesben- und Schwulenverband in Deutschland) was founded in Berlin. The LSVD is today Germany's largest LGBT rights organisation. Several more advocacy groups were formed, including Lesbenring in 1982, the Association of Lesbian and Gay Journalists (Bund Lesbischer und Schwuler JournalistInnen) in Cologne in 1997, the Ecumenical Working Group Homosexuals and the Church (Ökumenische Arbeitsgruppe Homosexuelle und Kirche) in 1977, and the Association of Gay and Lesbian Police Officers (Verband lesbischer und schwuler Polizeibediensteter), among many others. The Bundesverband Trans* and Intersexuelle Menschen e.V. are among several groups campaigning for transgender and intersex rights.

The first Christopher Street Day occurred in Berlin in 1979 with 400 masked participants. Attendance increased thereafter, with 15,000 attendees in 1990 and reaching 100,000 attendees in the late 90s. In 2005, the event attracted an estimated 400,000 people. Today, Berlin Pride is among the city's largest events, attracting an estimated one million attendees in 2019. Outside Berlin, pride parades are also held in numerous cities, including Bremen and Cologne which held their first events in 1979, and Hamburg (known as Hamburg Pride) and Munich whose first pride events were organized in 1980. Freiburg im Breisgau organized its first pride event in 1985, followed by Frankfurt in 1993, Dresden in 1994, Dortmund in 1996, Kiel in 1998 and Stuttgart in 1999. Events are also held in Bonn, Leipzig, Karlsruhe, Hanover, Nuremberg, Darmstadt, Bielefeld, Düsseldorf, Essen, Duisburg, Heidelberg, Wuppertal, Mannheim, Saarbrücken and Lübeck, among many others.

== Demographics ==
A May 2019 study revealed that 6.9% of the German population identified as LGBTI. The study also showed that 10.6% of the population of Cologne between the ages of 18 and 75 described themselves as lesbian, gay, bisexual, transgender, intersex or queer. This accounted to over 87,000 people in the city. In 2019, the European Union Agency For Fundamental Rights conducted a survey of LGBT individuals which found that 18% identified as Protestant, 17% as Catholic and 55% as irreligious. A 2023 survey found that most religious LGBT Germans identified as Protestant.

== Public opinion ==
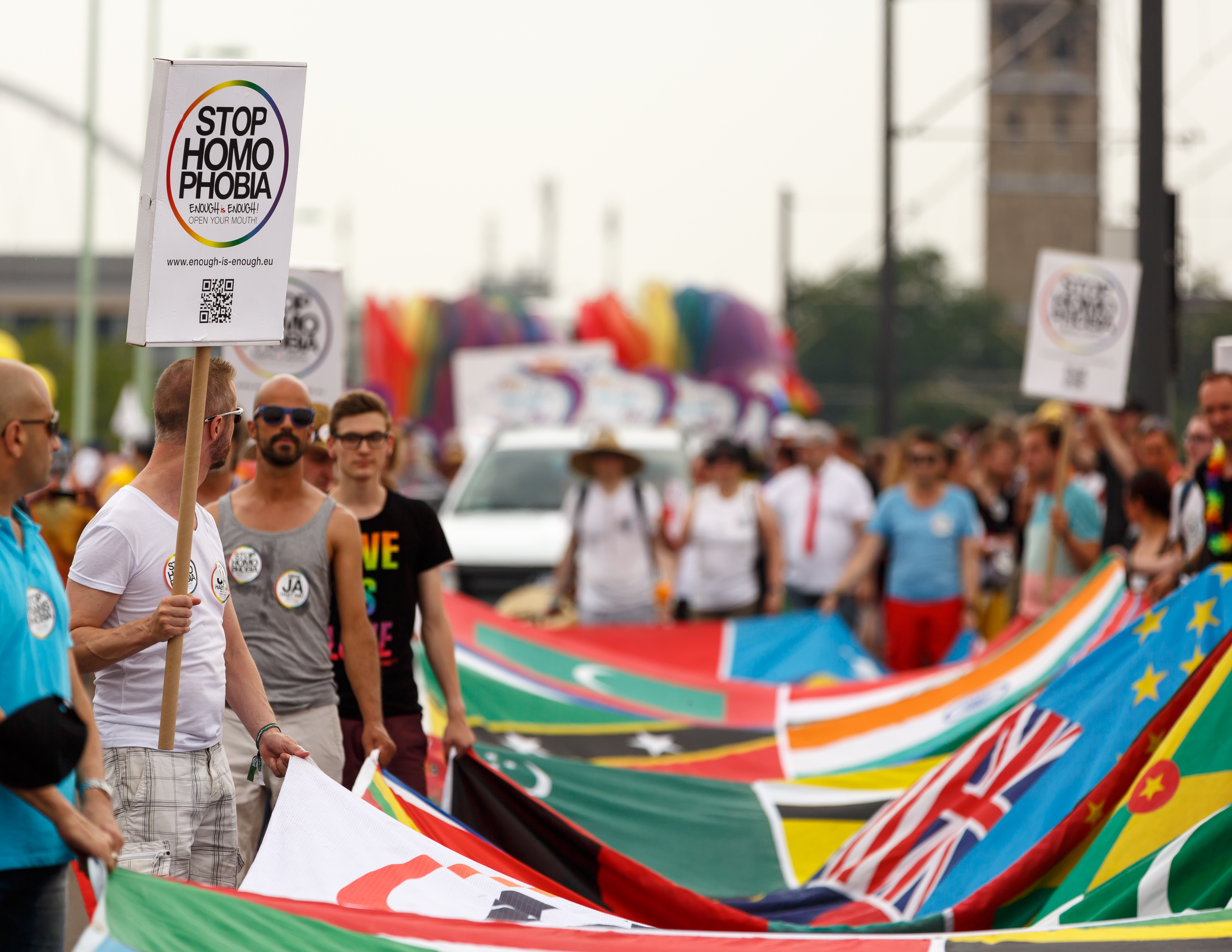
LGBT rights activists at Cologne Pride carrying a banner with the flags of over 70 countries where homosexuality is illegal

A 2013 Pew Research Center poll indicated that 87% of Germans believed that homosexuality should be accepted by society, which was the second highest in the 39 countries polled, following Spain at 88%.

46% of 20,000 German LGBT people said they had experienced discrimination because of their sexual orientation and gender identity in the past year per the 2013 results of a survey by the EU's Fundamental Rights Agency (the EU average was 47%). Two-thirds of respondents said they concealed their sexual orientation at school and in public life and a fifth felt discriminated at work.

In May 2015, PlanetRomeo, an LGBT social network, published its first Gay Happiness Index (GHI). Gay men from over 120 countries were asked about how they feel about society's view on homosexuality, how they experience the way they are treated by other people and how satisfied are they with their lives. Germany was ranked 14th with a GHI score of 68.

A 2017 poll found that 83% of Germans supported same-sex marriage, 16% were against. For comparison, the 2015 Eurobarometer found that 66% of Germans thought that same-sex marriage should be allowed throughout Europe, 29% were against.

The 2019 Eurobarometer showed that 88% of Germans believed gay and bisexual people should enjoy the same rights as heterosexual people, and 84% supported same-sex marriage.

The 2023 Eurobarometer found that 84% of Germans thought same-sex marriage should be allowed throughout Europe, and 84% agreed that "there is nothing wrong in a sexual relationship between two persons of the same sex".

== Summary table ==
Right	Status
Same-sex sexual activity legal	Yes (Legal in East Germany since 1968, legal in West Germany since 1969)
Equal age of consent (14)	Yes (Since 1994 in unified Germany, in East Germany since 1988)
Anti-discrimination laws in employment	Yes In Brandenburg since 1992 (the first Bundesland). Nationwide since 2006
Anti-discrimination laws in the provision of goods and services	Yes (Nationwide since 2006)
Anti-discrimination laws in all other areas (incl. indirect discrimination, hate speech)	Yes
Anti-discrimination laws covering gender identity in all areas	Yes In Brandenburg since 1992 (the first Bundesland). Nationwide since 2006
Discrimination based on sex characteristics prohibited	Yes
Hate crimes and hate speech based on sexual orientation, gender identity and sex characteristics prohibited	Yes
Same-sex marriage	Yes (Since 2017)
Same-sex civil unions	Yes (Since 2001)
Stepchild adoption by same-sex couples	Yes (Since 2005)
Joint adoption by same-sex couples	Yes (Since 2017)
Automatic parenthood on birth certificates for children of same-sex couples	No (Pending as of September 2018)
LGBTI people allowed to serve openly in the military and as German police officers	Yes (Since 1990 for lesbian, gay and bisexual individuals and since 2021 for transgender and intersex individuals)
Third gender option on a birth certificate	Yes (Since 2019)
Change of sex on a birth certificate by self-determination without barriers or impediments	Yes (Since 2024)
Gender self-identification	Yes (Since 2024, for those aged 18+)
Legal recognition of non-binary gender	Yes (Since 2024)
Homosexuality, transgender identity and transvestism declassified as illnesses	(Homosexuality has not been classified as a mental disorder since the ICD-10-GM came into effect; however, transgender identity and transvestism are still classified as such, since the ICD-11 has not yet been implemented in Germany.)
Conversion therapy banned on minors	Yes (Since 2020)
Access to IVF for lesbian couples	Yes (Not legally binding, but doctors and sperm banks may work with lesbian couples if they wish)
Commercial surrogacy for gay male couples	No (Both altruistic and commercial surrogacy are illegal for all couples, different-sex and same-sex; however, case law allows a foreign judicial decision establishing legal parenthood of the genetic father and his life partner to be recognised under certain conditions in case of surrogacy abroad)
MSMs allowed to donate blood	Yes (Legal since 2017; From 1 April 2023, the updated "individual risk-based assessment" blood donation policy was brought into effect throughout Germany.)

== See also ==
- Same-sex marriage in Germany
- LSVD+
- Intersex rights in Germany
- Transgender rights in Germany
- Human rights in Germany
- LGBTQ rights in the European Union
- LGBTQ rights in Europe
