= Federal Government Commissioner for the Acceptance of Sexual and Gender Diversity =

German federal office tasked with safeguarding LGBTQ+ rights

Commissioner for the Acceptance of Sexual and Gender Diversity of Government of Germany

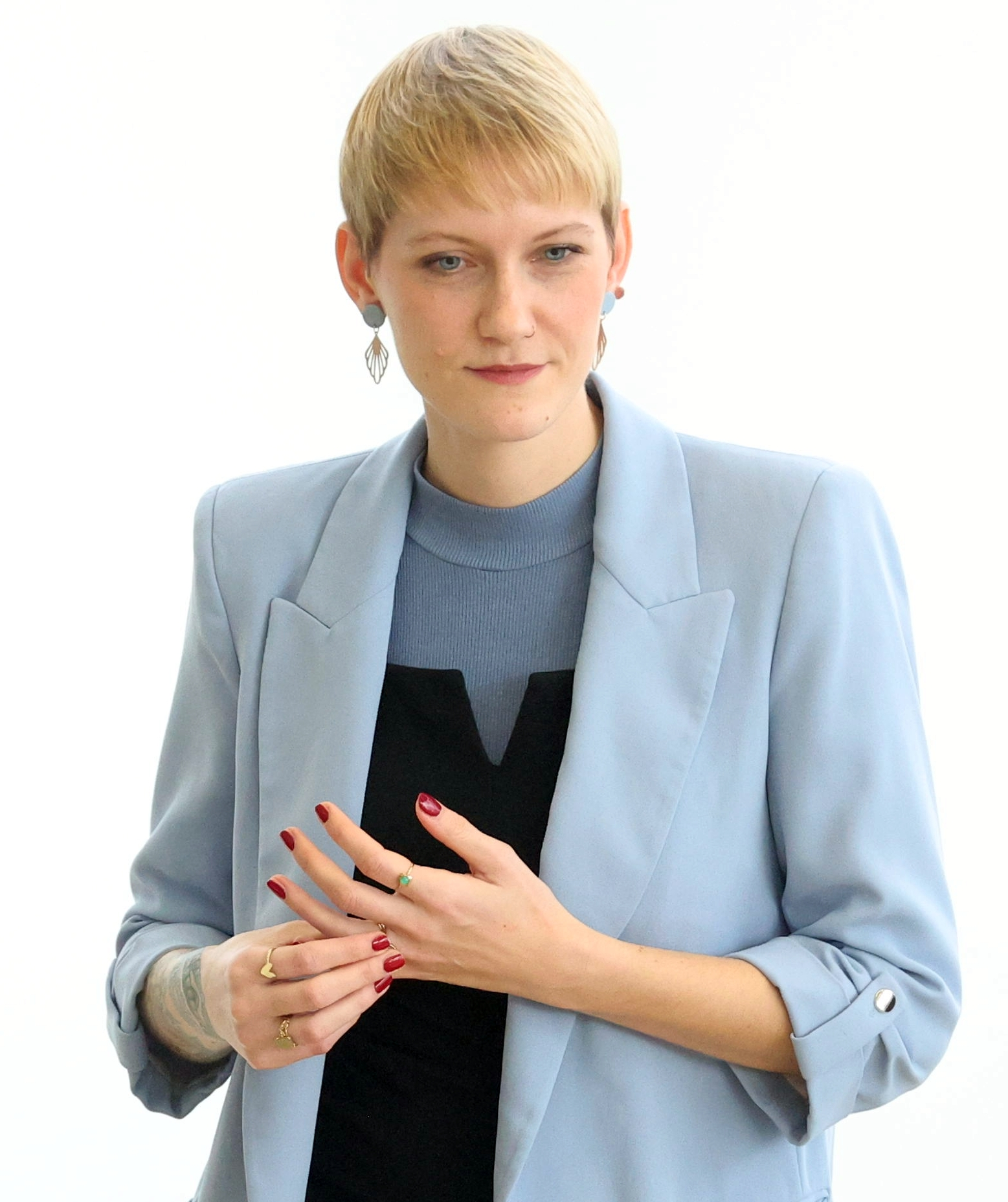
- Incumbent; Sophie Koch since 28 May 2025
- Inaugural holder: Sven Lehmann
- Formation: 5 January 2022
- Unofficial names: Queer Commissioner
- Website: Official Website (German)

The Federal Government Commissioner for the Acceptance of Sexual and Gender Diversity (known as Commissioner for LGBTIQ+ Equality for short and informally nicknamed the "Queer Commissioner") is an office in the federal Government of Germany's Federal Ministry for Education, Family Affairs, Senior Citizens, Women and Youth that is tasked with promoting and defending LGBTQ rights and fighting anti-LGBTQ hate. The incumbent has been Sophie Koch since 28 May 2025.

The office was created by the coalition government of Chancellor Olaf Scholz in 2021. The inaugural holder of the office is Sven Lehmann of the Alliance 90/The Greens. In November 2022 the federal cabinet adopted a new strategy to promote LGBTIQ+ rights and combat anti-LGBTIQ+ hate.

== Policy ==
On November 18, 2022, the German Federal Government adopted the Queer Living Action Plan . It encompasses the following areas of action: legal recognition, participation, safety, health, strengthening of support and community structures, and international relations. The Commissioner coordinates the work process for its implementation. It is supported by the Federal Service Center for Queer Living (German: Bundesservicestelle Queeres Leben) within the Federal Office for Family Affairs and Civil Society, an office within the same ministry.

Of the 140 associations and initiatives that applied to participate in the working group process for the German Federal Government's "Queer Living" action plan through the expression of interest process, 78 were selected. The budget for the action plan was €342,245 in 2023. No projects will be funded in 2024. The evaluation of the action plan, which has a budget of €210,000, is not scheduled to begin until early 2025.

== List of officeholders ==
No.	Name	Time in office	Party
1	Sven Lehmann	2021-2025	Alliance 90/The Greens
2	Sophie Koch	2025-present	SPD
