= Arndt Klocke =

German politician (born 1971)

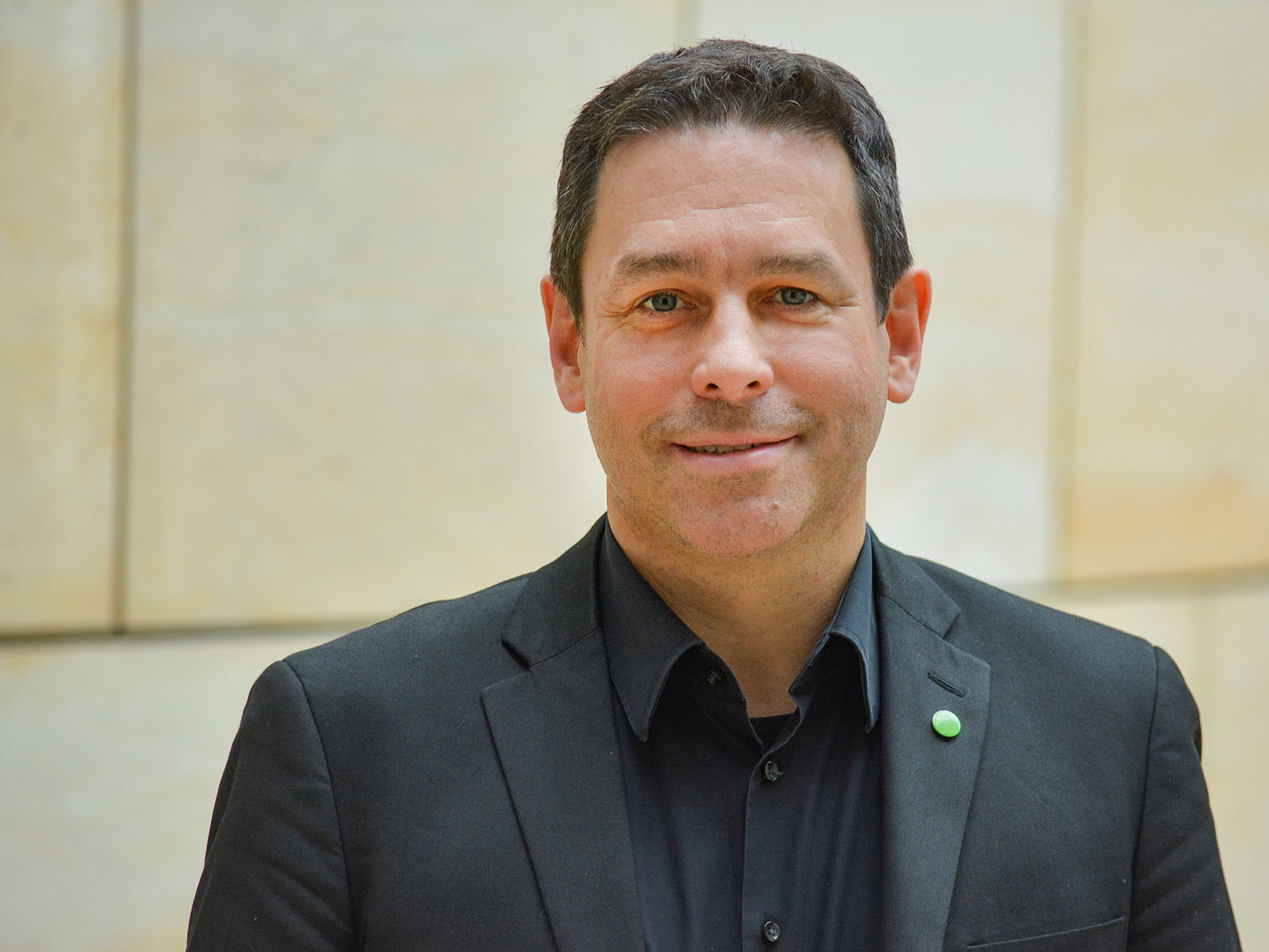
- Klocke in 2018

Member of the Landtag of North Rhine-Westphalia
- Incumbent
- Assumed office 9 June 2010
- Constituency: Cologne III (2024–present)

Personal details
- Born: 11 February 1971 (age 55) Bad Oeynhausen
- Party: Alliance 90/The Greens
- Spouse: Sven Lehmann (m. 2024)

Arndt Klocke (born 11 February 1971 in Bad Oeynhausen) is a German politician serving as a member of the Landtag of North Rhine-Westphalia since 2010. He has been married to Sven Lehmann since 2024.
