= Akademie Waldschlösschen =

Coordinates: 51.4600°N 10.0185°E

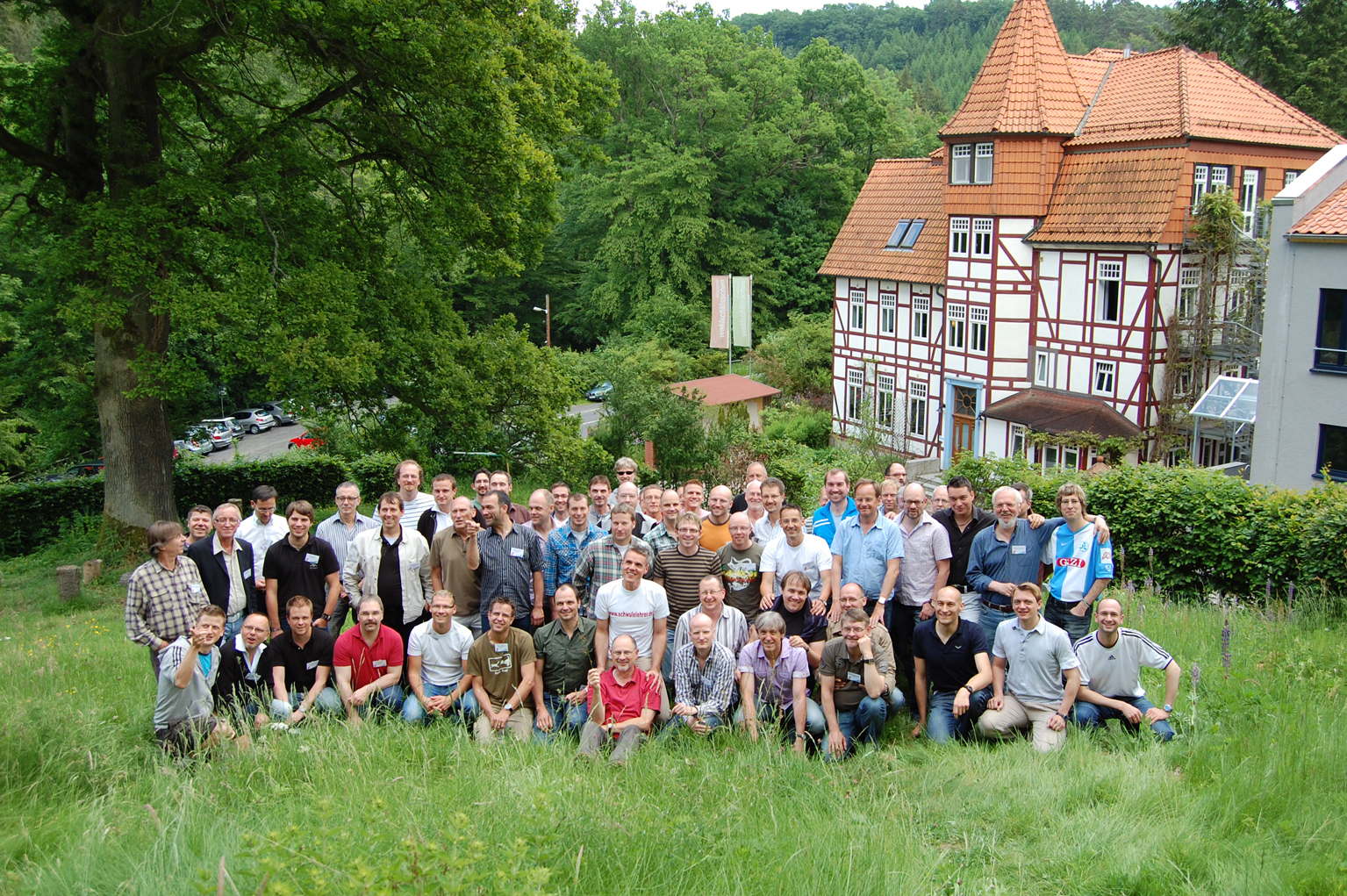
Teachers conference in 2009

The Akademie Waldschlösschen (Waldschlösschen Academy) is an education and conference center near Reinhausen in Lower Saxony, between Göttingen and Heiligenstadt.

== Building and history ==
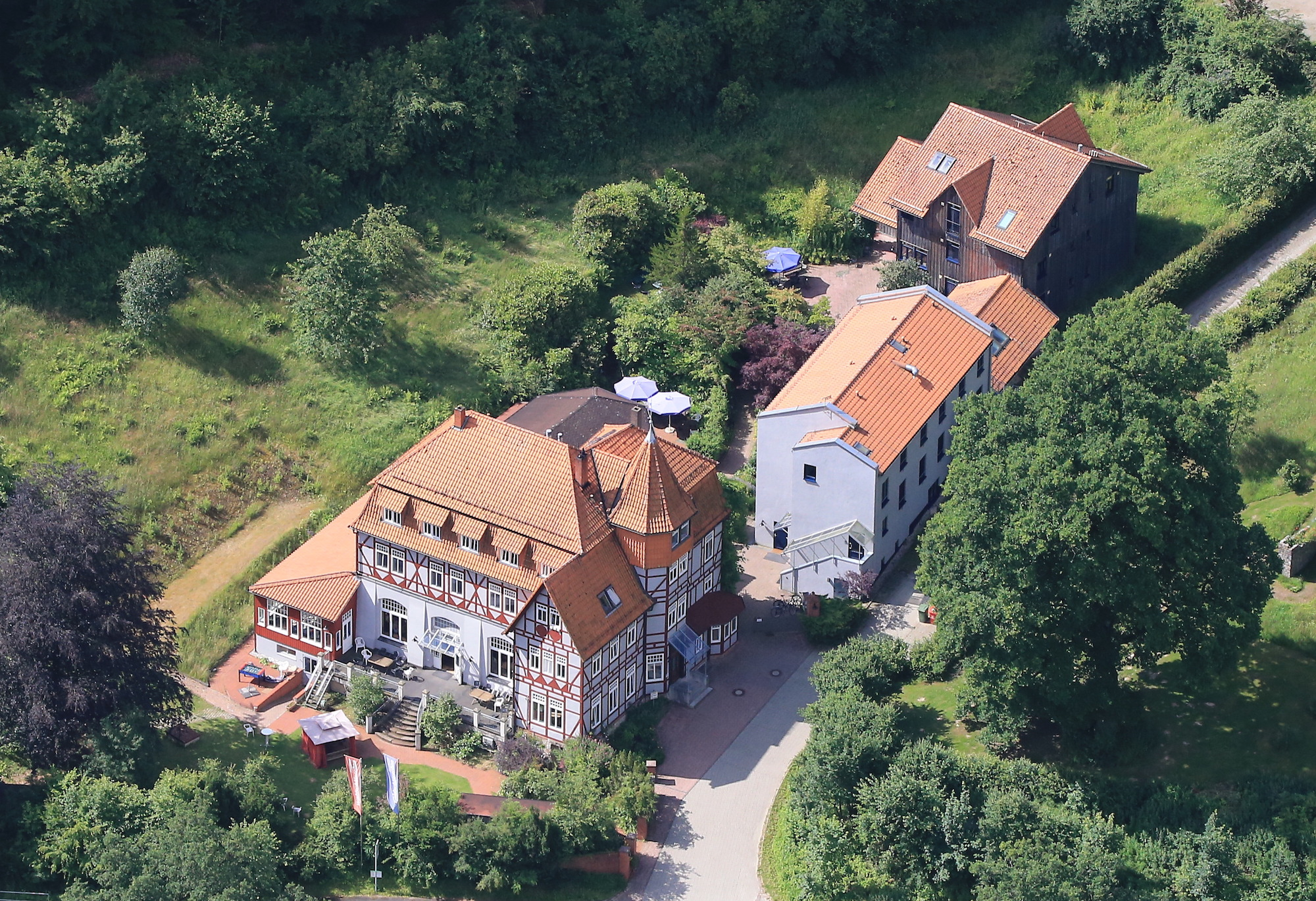
Aerial view of the landmarked building (left) and newer additions (right)

The main building of the institution was built in 1904 as the "Kurhotel Waldschlösschen" (Waldschlösschen Spa Hotel). In 1981, the founders of the Akademie took over the vacant, landmarked building as the headquarters of the educational institution, initially named "Freies Tagungshaus Waldschlösschen" (Waldschlösschen Independent Conference Center). In 2000, the name was changed to "Akademie Waldschlösschen".

In 1989, the opening of the inner-German border located just five kilometers to the southeast shifted the Waldschlösschen to the geographic center of Germany. In 1990, 2008, 2018, and 2024, four more seminar and accommodation buildings were added to the original building.

Since 2000, the Akademie has been accredited as a Heimvolkshochschule (residential institution for continuing adult education) under the terms of the Niedersächsisches Erwachsenenbildungsgesetz (Lower Saxony Adult Education Act). This status leads to a dedicated budget line within the annual state budget, in the same manner as Lower Saxony's 22 other accredited Heimvolkshochschulen. In 2003, founders Rainer Marbach and Ulli Klaum established the Akademie Waldschlösschen Charitable Trust, which continues to oversee the Akademie.

== Mission ==
Drawing on the German gay movement of the 1970s, the Akademie Waldschlösschen was founded as a place of education and conversations of and with gays, as an educational institution that was "open" to society and brought the topic of societal anti-homosexuality into educational work for all interested parties in order to help break down prejudices. From the outset the work of the Akademie, which saw itself as part of the "New Social Movements", was not limited to the target group of gays. It developed into a nationwide center of conversations, networking, and training in emancipatory LGBT*I work, for example of teachers, lawyers, theologians, gay fathers and gay, gay-lesbian and queer university student groups as well as Trans*Aktiv – which led, among other things, to the founding of the Bundesverband Trans* (Federal Trans* Association) – and in cooperation with Intersexuelle Menschen (Intersexual People). The Waldschlösschen is mentioned several times in Ralf König's books, for example as the setting of Beach Boys (Rowohlt 1989, ISBN 3499134578).

The queer self-concept of the Akademie Waldschlösschen, developed from a critique of heteronormativity, is informed by the idea "that identities, norms, and values are not self-evident or natural, but are based on social factors and must be seen as constructed, in need of reconsideration and renegotiation." The work of the Akademie “is based on:

- the conviction that all people have equal rights and should participate in the distribution of influence and creative power in society,
- respect for the diversity and variability of lifestyles, genders, and sexualities,
- critique of the prevailing heteronormativity and inequality in our society,
- a firm belief in the value of self-organization and self-responsibility."

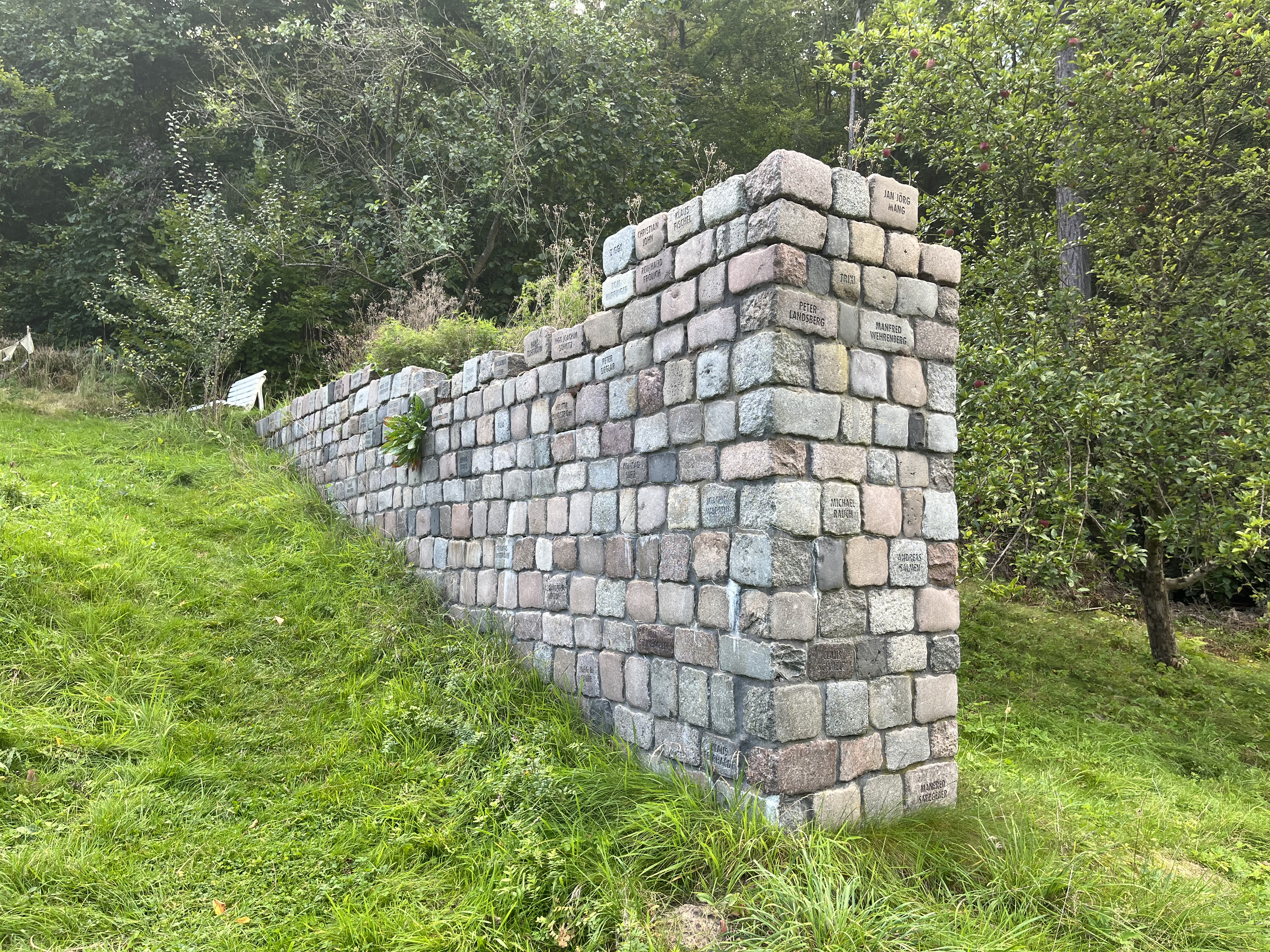
"Nature Forte" (2006) by Tom Fecht, a component of his multi-site AIDS art project "Mémoire nomade: (Thinking Space: Names and Stones)"

The Akademie Waldschlösschen is also important for AIDS work in Germany. It initially met the challenges of the AIDS crisis of the 1980s through the nationwide networking of AIDS service organizations, which led to the founding of the Federal Association of German AIDS Service Organizations, with which it has worked as an educational partner ever since. Since 1985, it has also developed an advanced training program for professional and volunteer staff members of AIDS service organizations. In addition, it has promoted networking, continuing education, and self-organization of people with HIV and AIDS from all walks of life. Rita Süssmuth, the former Federal Minister of Health and President of the Bundestag, attended seminars at the Akademie Waldschlösschen several times and said in her speech on the occasion of the official state recognition of the Akademie as a Heimvolkshochschule that she owed her personal "learning and development process regarding homosexuality and AIDS" to the Waldschlösschen. A visible expression of mourning for the many people who have died of AIDS is the memorial project Names and Stones, a "thinking space" in the outdoor area of the Akademie with names of those who have died.

The importance of the Akademie Waldschlösschen as an educational and networking resource for the LGBTIQ* movement became particularly clear during the coronavirus pandemic. Like many educational institutions, the Akademie was forced to temporarily cease operations and educational activities as a result of contact restrictions and a lockdown. It soon ran into financial difficulties due to lack of income and the absence of partial federal and state funding for its educational programs. An appeal for donations initiated by the Akademie's staff raised well over 100,000 euros in just a few days. Most of these donations were small amounts from private individuals.

== Educational program ==
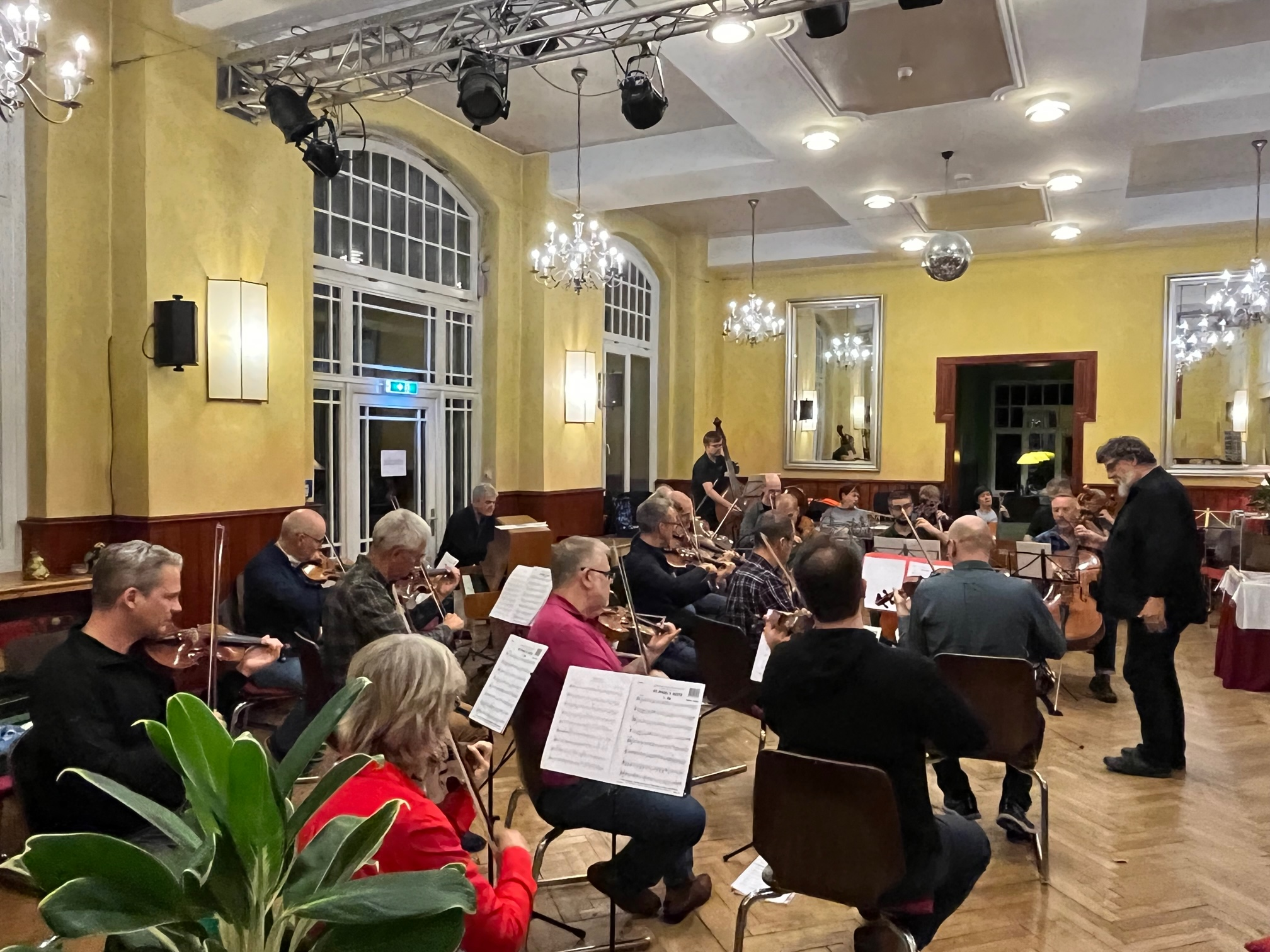
Orchestra rehearsal 2022

The Akademie Waldschlösschen's program of workshops and seminars is aimed at people from all sectors of society. There are offerings in the areas of "Social Commitment and Self-Help", "Lifestyle and Health", "Knowledge, Art and Language", and "Continuing Education in the Workplace". The Akademie attains its "special profile through educational offerings

- on gay and lesbian, trans* and inter*gender, queer lifestyles
- for people with HIV
- for people with disabilities
- in the focus "Youth in the Waldschlösschen"
- for anti-discrimination work and to raise awareness of the issues of people with intersectional queerness facing multiple forms of discrimination and marginalization
- on sexual education for diversity
- to train volunteer workers, especially those committed to combating homophobia, trans*-, and inter*phobia or active in the HIV/STI field
- for the continuing education of teachers and of social workers involved with LGBATIQ* and HIV/STI issues
- to examine scholarly research on the main priorities of the Akademie's work."

As part of its educational mission, the Akademie Waldschlösschen cooperates with individuals, groups, and networks that are committed to combating homo-, trans*-, and inter*phobia, as well as racism and hostility towards immigration. Initiating and supporting self-help and networking civil and social structures play a central role in this. In-service training – especially for those in social professions (e.g., those working with people with disabilities, homophobia in sports, and gender diversity education) – are part of the program.

"The Akademie Waldschlösschen stands for the acceptance of sexual and gender diversity and advances the visibility and participation of such groups in society through education and networking. Its educational work with an intersectional approach serves to strengthen self-confidence, gender self-determination, and identities. It provides an open space for reflection on their historical and social conditionality, thus providing an opportunity to critique the prevailing heteronormativity and the resultant inequalities in our society. Through the pilot project 'Akzeptanz für Vielfalt – gegen Homo-, Trans*- und Inter*feindlichkeit' ('Acceptance of diversity – against homo-, trans*-, and inter*phobia') included in the broader federal project 'Demokratie leben!' ('Live democracy!') of the Bundesministerium für Familie, Senioren, Frauen und Jugend (Federal Ministry for Family Affairs, Seniors, Women, and Youth), the Akademie has been striving for a society-wide alliance for acceptance of diversity since 2015.

Since 1999, the Akademie Waldschlösschen has been a Heimvolkshochschule recognized by the state as eligible for financial aid under the Lower Saxony Adult Education Act. It is a recognized provider of political education at the Bundeszentrale für politische Bildung (Federal Agency for Civic Education) and a recognized educational partner of the Bundesministerium für Bildung und Forschung (Federal Ministry of Education and Research). It is a member of the competence network for the reduction of homophobia and trans*-hostility in the federal program "Demokratie leben!" (together with the Lesbian and Gay Association in Germany (LSVD) and the Federal Trans* Association). As a member of the Arbeitskreis deutscher Bildungsstätten (Working Group of German Educational Institutions), it is a provider of political youth education with a youth education officer.

The Akademie Waldschlösschen hosts numerous guest conferences alongside its own seminars and workshops, primarily in cooperation with universities, public agencies, and social institutions. Around 6,000 participants with 15,000 overnight stays attend 300 events at the Akademie each year.

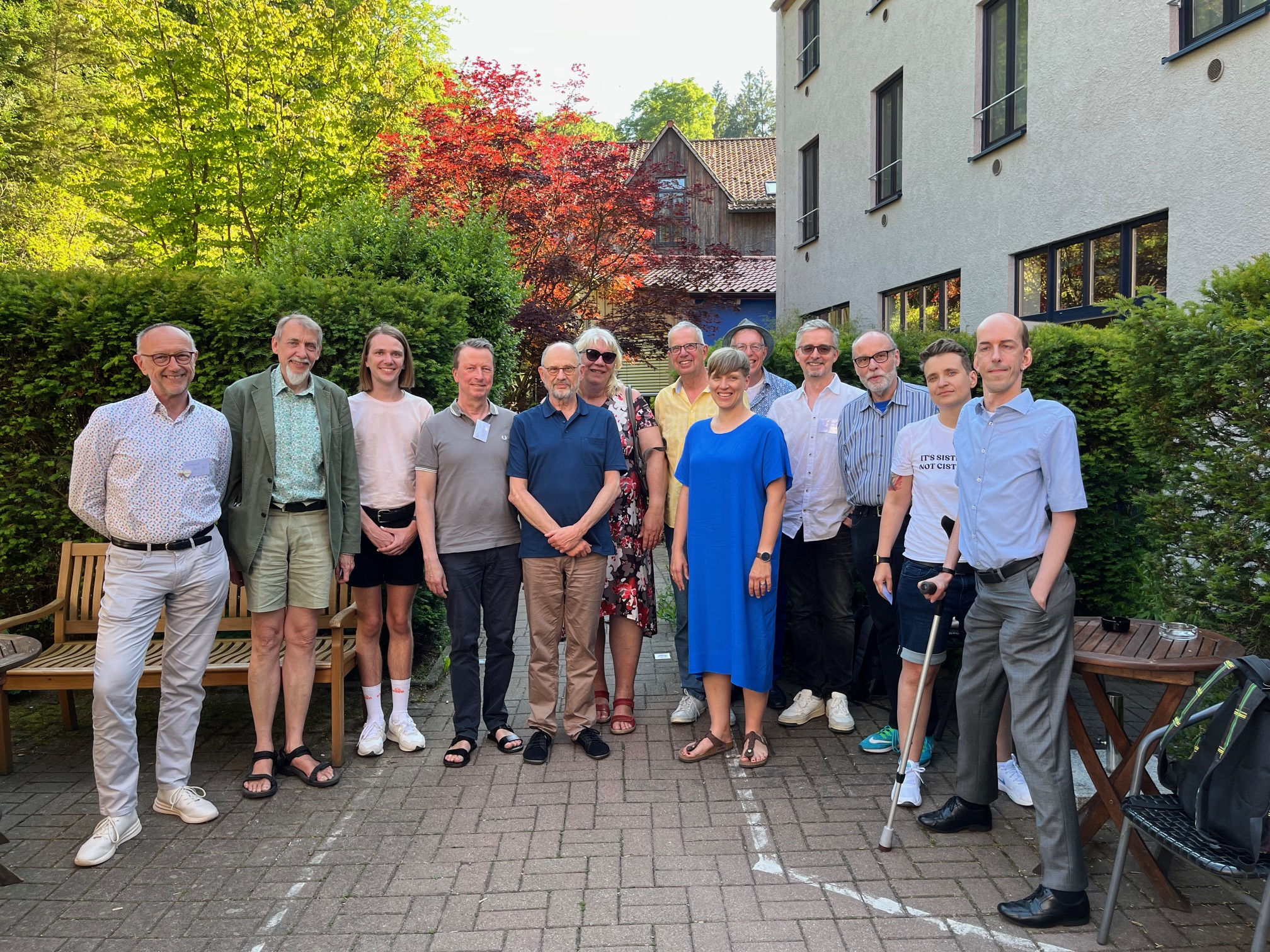
Board of Trustees in 2023

== Charitable Trust Board ==
Members of the Akademie Waldschlösschen Board of Directors are Kevin Rosenberger (chair) and Ulli Klaum.

The Akademie's Board of Trustees consists of Rainer Marbach (chair), Silke Eggers (deputy chair), Stephan Baglikow, Hans Hengelein, Winfried Holz, Mareike Klauenflügel-Thwaithes, Klaus Müller, Martin Podszus, Stefan Reiss, Jenny Luca Renner, Silvia Rentzsch, Carsten Schatz, Joachim Schulte, Klaus Stehling, Volker Weiss, and Thomas Wilde.

== Selected publications ==
Since 1999 the Akademie has published two series: the Edition Waldschlösschen (19 volumes as of the end of 2021, with Männerschwarm Verlag) and, with its own Waldschlösschen imprint, the Edition Waldschlösschen – Materialien (20 volumes as of the end of 2020), which comprises books and booklets that primarily document and assemble materials from the institution's educational events.

- Jean Jacques Soukup (eds.): Die DDR. Der Aufbruch. Die Schwulen. Versuch einer Bestandaufnahme. Verein für Soziale und Pädagogische Arbeit, 1990, ISBN 3-9802426-0-9.
- Michael Bochow, Rainer Marbach (eds.): Islam und Homosexualität. Koran / Islamische Länder / Situation in Deutschland. MännerschwarmSkript-Verlag, 2003, ISBN 3-935596-24-3.
- Lüder Tietz (ed.): Homosexualität verstehen. Kritische Konzepte für die psychologische und pädagogische Praxis. MännerschwarmSkript-Verlag, 2004, ISBN 3-935596-59-6.
- Michael Bochow: Ich bin doch schwul und will das immer bleiben. Schwule Männer im dritten Lebensalter. MännerschwarmSkript-Verlag, 2005, ISBN 3-935596-79-0.
- Volker Weiss:: … mit ärztlicher Hilfe zum richtigen Geschlecht? Zur Kritik der medizinischen Konstruktion der Transsexualität. MännerschwarmSkript-Verlag, 2009, ISBN 978-3-939542-37-7.
- Andreas Pretzel, Volker Weiss (eds.): Ohnmacht und Aufbegehren. Homosexuelle Männer in der frühen Bundesrepublik. Geschichte der Homosexuellen in Deutschland nach 1945, vol 1. Männerschwarm Verlag, 2010, ISBN 978-3-939542-81-0.
- Michael Bochow, Andreas Pretzel (eds.): Ich wollte es so normal wie andere auch. Walter Guttmann erzählt sein Leben. Männerschwarm Verlag, 2011, ISBN 978-3-86300-102-5.
- Andreas Pretzel, Volker Weiss (eds.): Rosa Radikale. Die Schwulenbewegung der 1970er Jahre. Geschichte der Homosexuellen in Deutschland nach 1945, vol. 2. Männerschwarm Verlag, 2012, ISBN 978-3-86300-123-0.
- Volker Weiß, Bodo Niendel (eds.): Queer zur Norm. Leben jenseits einer schwulen oder lesbischen Identität. Männerschwarm Verlag, 2012, ISBN 978-3-863001-16-2.
- Andreas Pretzel, Volker Weiss (eds.): Zwischen Autonomie und Integration. Schwule Politik und Schwulenbewegung in den 1980er und 1990er Jahren. Geschichte der Homosexuellen in Deutschland nach 1945, vol. 3. Männerschwarm Verlag, 2013, ISBN 978-3-86300-151-3.
- Rainer Marbach, Volker Weiss (eds.): Konformitäten und Konfrontationen. Homosexuelle in der DDR. Geschichte der Homosexuellen in Deutschland nach 1945, vol. 4. Männerschwarm Verlag, 2017, ISBN 978-3-86300-182-7.
- Andreas Pretzel, Volker Weiss (eds.): Politiken in Bewegung. Die Emanzipation Homosexueller im 20. Jahrhundert. Geschichte der Homosexuellen in Deutschland nach 1945, vol. 5. Männerschwarm Verlag, 2017, ISBN 978-3-86300-203-9.
- Carolin Küppers, Rainer Marbach (eds.): Communities, Camp und Camouflage. Bewegung in Kunst und Kultur. Geschichte der Homosexuellen in Deutschland nach 1945, vol. 6. Männerschwarm Verlag, 2017, ISBN 978-3-86300-236-7.
- Carolin Küppers, Martin Schneider (eds.): Orte der Begegnung, Orte des Widerstands. Zur Geschichte homosexueller, trans*geschlechtlicher und queerer Räume. Geschichte der Homosexuellen in Deutschland nach 1945, vol. 7. Männerschwarm Verlag, Salzgeber Buchverlage, 2018, ISBN 978-3-86300-256-5.
- Ines Pohlkamp, Kevin Rosenberger. Akzeptanz für Vielfalt von klein auf! Sexuelle und geschlechtliche Vielfalt in Kinderbüchern. Ein Rezensionsband für pädagogische Fachkräfte in Kindertagesstätten. Materialien, no. 18. Waldschlösschen Verlag, 2018.
- Carolin Vierneisel (ed.). Queeres Lehren und Lernen an lehramtsbildenden Hochschulen. Verortungen und Impulse im Rahmen der Arbeit der Forschungs- und Netzwerkstelle Vielfalt Lehren! Materialien, no. 19. Waldschlösschen Verlag, 2019.
- Karsten Nietzschmann et al. Vielfalts*bezogenene Perspektiven und Erfahrungen von Dozierenden im Lehramtsstudium in Sachsen und Oldenburg. Bericht zu den Ergebnissen der Forschungs- und Netzwerkstelle Vielfalt Lehren! Materialien, no. 20. Waldschlösschen Verlag, 2019.
- Carolin Küppers, Martin Schneider (eds.): Zwischen Annäherung und Abgrenzung. Religion und LSBTIQ* in gesellschaftlicher Debatte und persönlichem Erleben. Geschichte der Homosexuellen in Deutschland nach 1945, vol. 8. Männerschwarm Verlag, 2021, ISBN 978-3-86300-288-6.
- Stephan Baglikow, Kim Alexandra Trau (eds.): Wurzeln – Bande – Flügel. Familie als Ort der Sozialisation, Kontrolle und Emanzipation. Geschichte der Homosexuellen in Deutschland nach 1945, vol. 9. Männerschwarm Verlag, 2021, ISBN 978-3-86300-313-5.

== Bibliography ==
- Rainer Marbach (ed.) Waldschlösschen mittendrin. Ein Lesebuch. MännerschwarmSkript-Verlag, 2006, ISBN 3-935596-45-6.
- Georg Etscheit. "Mitten in der Provinz. Die Akademie Waldschlösschen ist die einzige staatlich anerkannte Bildungsstätte für Schwule und Lesben", Die Zeit, no. 1, 28 December 2006, p. 69.
