= Lesbenring =

German lesbian organisation

- Established: 8 March 1982 (44 years ago)
- Legal status: Registered association
- Headquarters: Heidelberg
- Country: Germany
- Website: lesbenring.de

Lesbenring e.V. is the most important lesbian organisation in Germany. The organisation was founded in 1982 and is headquartered in Heidelberg, the office is located in Berlin.

The LesbenRing e. V. sees itself as a nationwide umbrella organization for lesbian women, lesbian groups and organizations. The LesbenRing has a seat and vote in the German Women's Council, is represented on the board of trustees of the Federal Magnus Hirschfeld Foundation (Bundesstiftung Magnus Hirschfeld), is a member of the ILGA (International Lesbian and Gay Association) and a founding member organization of the EL*C EuroCentralAsian Lesbian* Community.
