= Amicus-Briefbund =

First homosexual publication in Germany after WWII

Amicus-Briefbund was the first homosexual publication in Germany after World War II. It was published in West Berlin from 1948 to 1953.

In 1948, the former soldier Martin Knop received permission from the American occupation authorities in West Berlin to publish a magazine. The office was located at Nollendorfplatz. Amicus-Briefbund appeared monthly and consisted almost exclusively of personal ads and advertisements for events and venues aimed at same-sex loving men and women. The publisher's stated intention was to bring together those seeking "sincere comradeship" and "like-minded people" across "zonal and national boundaries," even if they did not want to "reveal themselves right away."

Personal ads came from all over Germany, although the majority came from Berlin, with the majority from West Berlin. Often, the ads simultaneously asked for the possibility of accommodation or work, or offered accommodation. In addition, the editor also encouraged placing ads for finding business partners and like-minded hobbies. Advertisements for pubs or events, on the other hand, came exclusively from West Berlin, since the East Berlin pubs wanted to attract as little attention as possible because of conflicts with the Soviet occupation forces.

The Amicus-Briefbund documented the homosexual life of the city for both men and women, that was already extensive soon after the war. For example, ten balls were advertised for February 1950, and eight for March 1950. Further advertisements for venues such as the Kleist-Kasino also offered opportunities to go out in between.

Since other magazines for homosexuals appeared at the latest from the beginning of the 1950s, which offered editorial content in addition to advertising sections, the Amicus-Briefbund became increasingly superfluous. In 1953 it ceased publication.

Knop was active in the Berlin gay scene in other ways besides publishing Amicus-Briefbund. He was a member and on the board of the Berlin Gesellschaft für Reform des Sexualstrafrechts (Society for Reform of Sexual Penal Law). At the end of 1951, inspired by the Hamburg magazine Die Freunde, he founded a Klub der Freunde (Club of Friends) in the bar Die Hütte in Goethestrasse, which joined the Frankfurt-based Verein fur humanitäre Lebensgestaltung (Association for Humanitarian Living).
