= Sophie Koch (politician) =

German politician (born 1993)

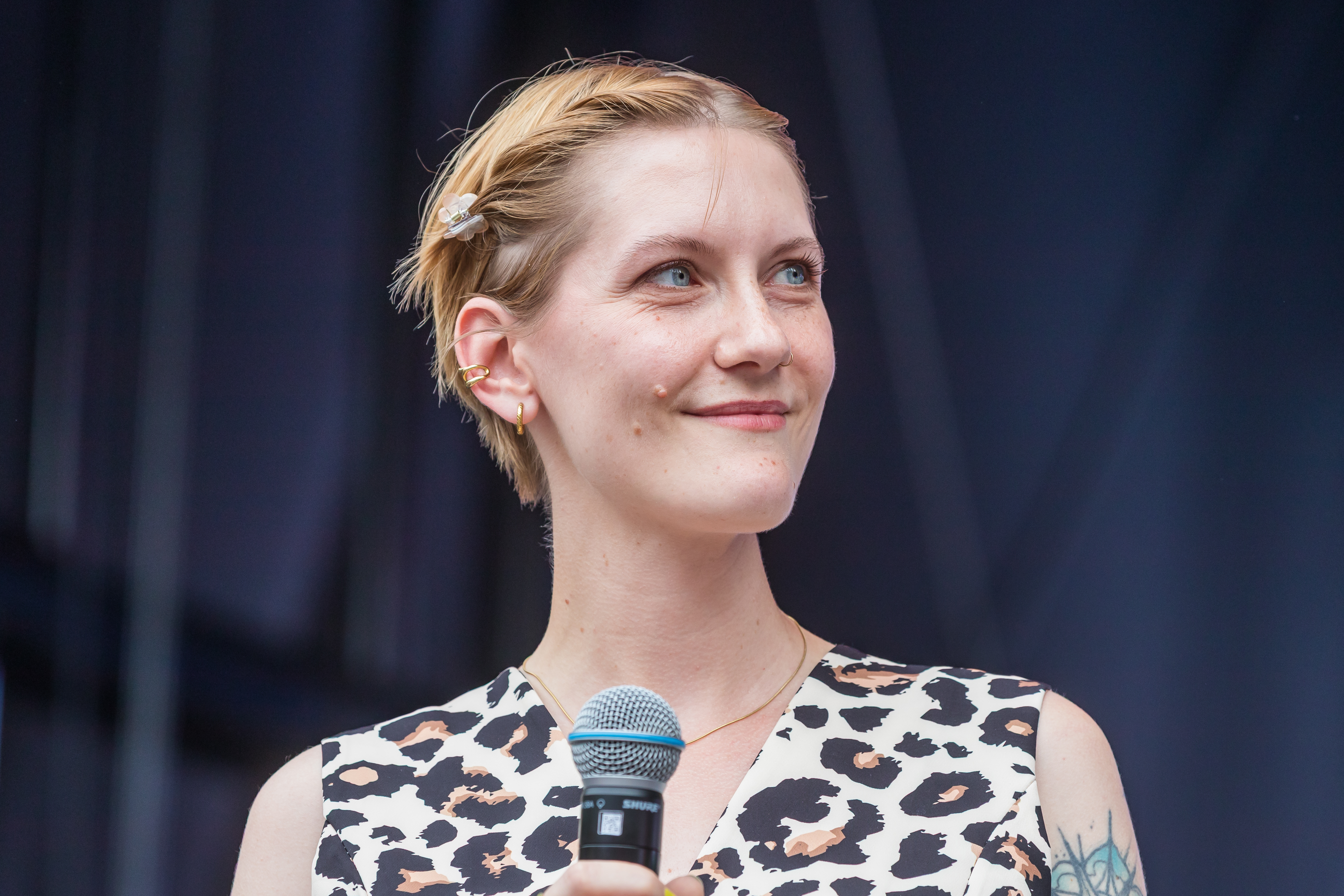
- Koch in 2025

Federal Government Commissioner for the Acceptance of Sexual and Gender Diversity
- Incumbent
- Assumed office 28 May 2025
- Chancellor: Friedrich Merz
- Preceded by: Sven Lehmann

Personal details
- Born: 26 July 1993 (age 32)
- Party: Social Democratic Party
- Website: sophiekoch.de

Sophie Koch (born 26 July 1993) is a German politician serving as Federal Government Commissioner for the Acceptance of Sexual and Gender Diversity since 2025. She has been a member of the Landtag of Saxony since 2024.

== Life and career ==
She completed her bachelor's degree in political science at Dresden University of Technology in 2020. From 2018 to 2022, she worked in public relations for Johanniter-Unfall-Hilfe Dresden. She then served as education officer for the Saxony Queer Network State Working Group until 2024.

Koch lives in Dresden.

== Political career ==
Koch initially served as chairwoman of the Young Socialists in Dresden from 2016 to 2019, then as state chairwoman in Saxony until 2021. She has been deputy state chairwoman of the SPD Saxony since 2021.

Koch ran in the 2019 state election in Saxony in the Dresden 6 constituency and was 15th on the SPD state list, but failed to win a seat in the Saxon state parliament. In the 2024 state election, she ran in the Dresden 2 constituency and won a seat in the state parliament, coming third on the SPD state list.

On 28 May 2025, Koch was appointed Federal Government Commissioner for the Acceptance of Sexual and Gender Diversity (Queer Commissioner).
