= Sven Lehmann =

German politician (born 1979)

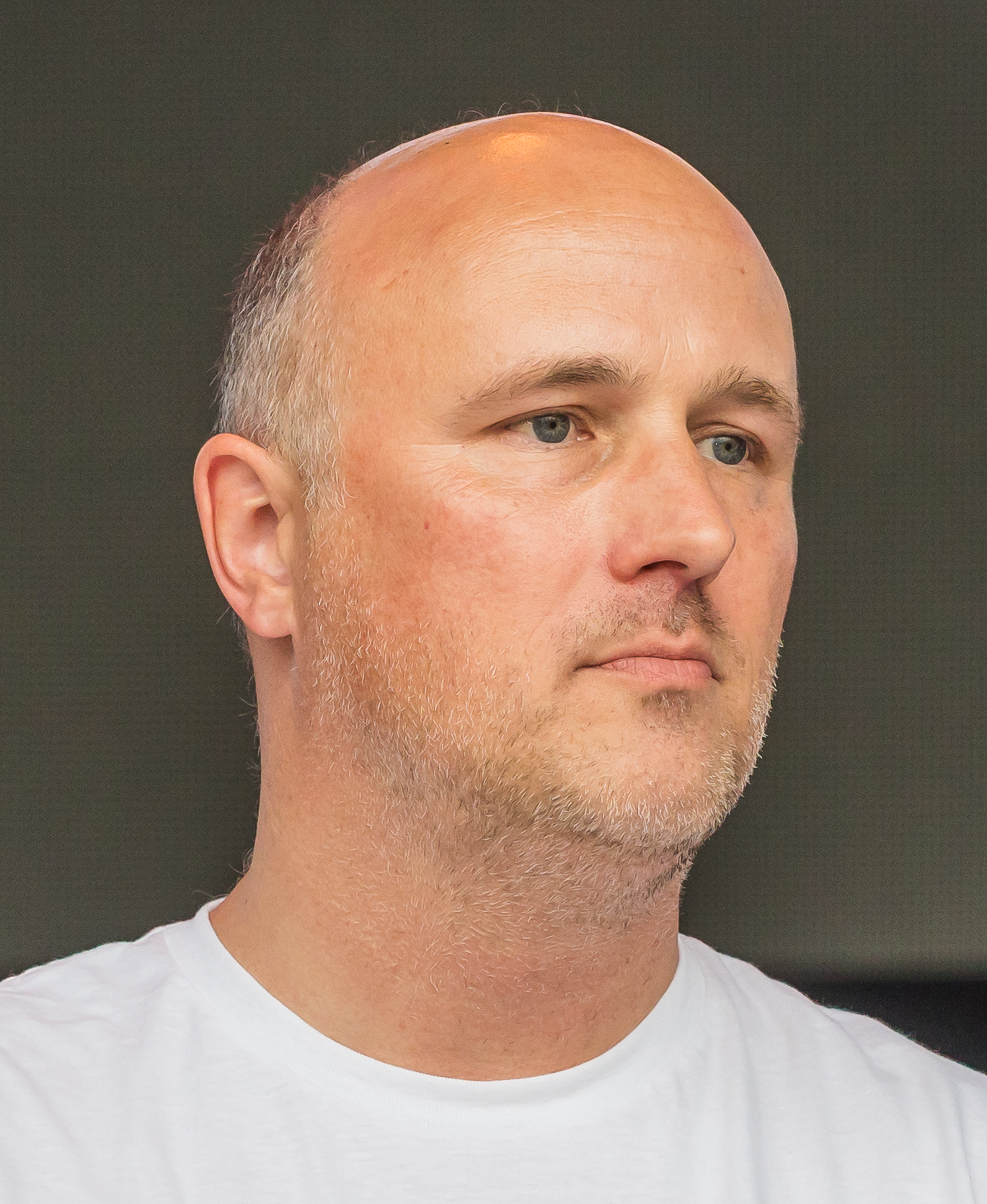
- Lehmann at Cologne Pride 2025

Member of the Bundestag
- Incumbent
- Assumed office 2017

Federal Government Commissioner for the Acceptance of Sexual and Gender Diversity
- In office 2021–2025
- Preceded by: Office established
- Succeeded by: Sophie Koch

Parliamentary State Secretary in the Federal Ministry of Family Affairs, Senior Citizens, Women and Youth
- In office 2021–2025

Personal details
- Born: 14 December 1979 (age 46) Troisdorf, West Germany
- Party: Greens
- Spouse: Arndt Klocke (m. 2024)
- Education: University of Cologne; Aix-Marseille University

Sven Lehmann (born 14 December 1979) is a German politician of Alliance 90/The Greens who has been serving as a member of the Bundestag from the state of North Rhine-Westphalia since 2017.

In addition to his parliamentary work, Lehmann served as Parliamentary State Secretary in the Federal Ministry of Family Affairs, Senior Citizens, Women and Youth and as the Federal Government's Commissioner for the Acceptance of Sexual and Gender Diversity (nicknamed the "Queer Commissioner") in the coalition government of Chancellor Olaf Scholz from 2021 to 2025.

== Early life and career ==
Lehmann grew up in Troisdorf in the Rhein-Sieg district in then-West Germany. In 1999 he graduated from the Gymnasium zum Altenforst in Troisdorf. In 1999 he began his studies of political science, Romance studies and education in Cologne and Aix-en-Provence, which he completed in 2006 as Magister Artium (M.A.).

From 2005 to 2007 Lehmann headed the constituency office of Kerstin Müller, a member of the Bundestag in Cologne. From 2007 he worked for the Rhineland Regional Council, most recently in occupational health management.

== Political career ==
From 2010 to 2018, Lehmann served as co-chair of the Green Party in North Rhine-Westphalia, alongside Monika Düker (2010–2014) and Mona Neubaur (2014–2018).

Lehmann became a member of the Bundestag in the 2017 German federal election, representing the Cologne II district. From 2018 until 2021, he was a member of the Committee on Labour and Social Affairs. He also served as his parliamentary group’s spokesman for queer politics and for social policy. Within his parliamentary group, coordinated the Trade Union and Social Advisory Council.

Lehmann was appointed Parliamentary State Secretary to the Federal Ministry of Family Affairs, Senior Citizens, Women and Youth on 8 December 2021. On 5 January 2022 the Federal Government appointed him as Commissioner for the Acceptance of Sexual and Gender Diversity.

In the negotiations to form a coalition government of the Christian Democratic Union (CDU) and the Green Party under Minister-President of North Rhine-Westphalia Hendrik Wüst following the 2022 state elections, Lehmann was part of his party’s delegation in the working group on equality, women, families, children and youth.

== Other activities ==
- Stiftung Lesen, Member of the Board of Trustees (since 2022)
- Magnus Hirschfeld Foundation, Member of the Board of Trustees

== Political positions ==
Within the Green Party, Lehmann is considered to be part of its left wing.

Referring to Women's Declaration International, Lehmann said "they are not women's rights advocates, they are transphobes."

In a podcast interview on online dating Lehmann remarked how actively Grindr was being used during parliament sessions, and how it relates to his work.
