= Mattachine Midwest =

Gay rights group in Chicago (1965–1986)

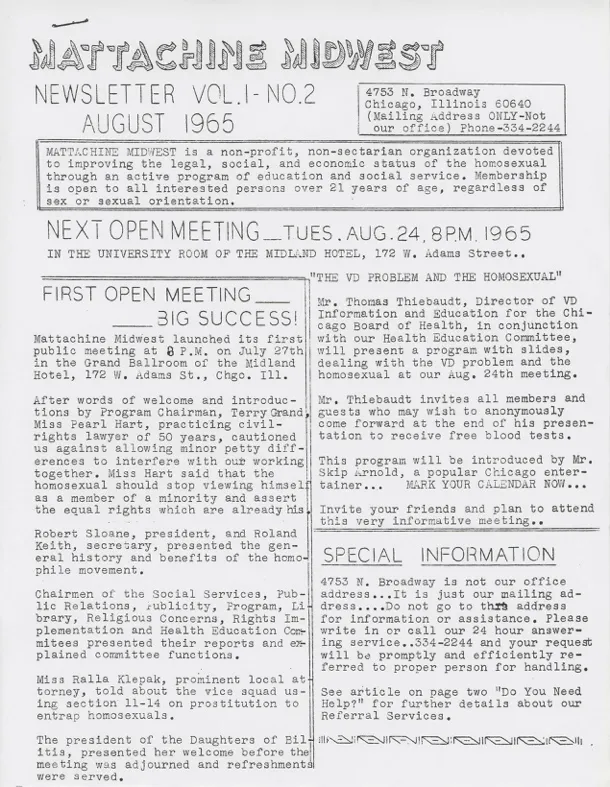
- The August 1965 edition of the organization's newsletter
- Named after: Mattachine Society
- Formation: 1965
- Founder: Bob Basker; Pearl M. Hart; Ira Jones; Bruce C. Scott; Valerie Taylor
- Dissolved: 1986
- Type: Gay rights group
- Location: Chicago, Illinois, United States
- Members: 150 (1979)
- Official language: English
- President: Bob Basker (first)
- Key people: William B. Kelley; Marie J. Kuda

Mattachine Midwest (/ˈmætəʃiːn/ MA-tə-sheen) was a gay rights organization active in Chicago, Illinois, United States. It was established in 1965 during the homophile movement and for several years operated as Chicago's major gay rights group. However, it lost this status during the gay liberation movement in the early 1970s and shifted its aims away from political activism and towards offering social services. At its peak in 1979, it had 150 members. However, in 1986, the group dissolved due to a declining membership and lack of leadership.

The organization stemmed from earlier efforts in the 1950s and early 1960s to sustain a local presence of the national Mattachine Society in Chicago. However, the failure of these efforts led local activists to believe that the formation of an independent organization was necessary. Additionally, activists believed that a local organization could help to address the recent uptick in police harassment, as the police in the early 1960s had been conducting an increased number of police raids on gay venues. In particular, several historians point to the 1964 Fun Lounge police raid as the main impetus for the formation of this new organization.

The organization was officially established in 1965, with activists Bob Basker, Pearl M. Hart, and Valerie Taylor among the founding members and William B. Kelley and Marie J. Kuda joining early on. In addition to monthly meetings, the organization published a newsletter and hosted a helpline that members of the community could call for things such as legal aid or religious assistance. Regarding legal aid, the organization had several attorneys that helped represent gay men in legal affairs and engaged in political activism against police harassment. Following the 1969 Stonewall riots and the emergence of the gay liberation movement, the organization lost its standing as Chicago's premier gay rights organization and began to shift away from political activism and towards social services. This included, among other things, the creation of discussion groups for gay alcoholics and for parents and friends of gay men. However, by the mid-1980s, the group was experiencing a dwindling membership and a lack of direction regarding the role it played in the gay community, and in 1986, it was dissolved.

Multiple historians cite the organization as one of the first successful gay rights groups in Chicago, and in 2002, it was inducted into the Chicago LGBT Hall of Fame. Additionally, in 2005, Chicago History published its first article on the LGBTQ history of Chicago, with the focus being on the history of Mattachine Midwest. Historians have also noted the importance of the newsletter in documenting the gay history of Chicago, with journalist Tracy Baim calling it a "treasure trove" of information on the topic. Much of the organization's records are housed in the Gerber/Hart Library and Archives.

== Background ==
Among the earliest records of LGBTQ history in Illinois come from the 1920s works of German American immigrant Henry Gerber. In 1924, he created the Society for Human Rights, which was the first gay rights group established in the United States, and published a periodical entitled Friendship and Freedom. However, in 1925, the Chicago Police Department conducted a police raid Gerber's house and arrested him and others associated with the organization. While charges against Gerber were eventually dropped, the raid brought about an end to the society, and it would be about 30 years before another gay rights group was established in Chicago.

=== Earlier Mattachine presence in Chicago ===
In 1950, the Mattachine Society was established in Los Angeles as an advocacy group for gay men. Around the same time, the Daughters of Bilitis was established to serve a similar role for lesbians. These groups were part of the homophile movement of the 1950s and 1960s, which sought to integrate LGBTQ individuals into mainstream society by winning support from experts in the medical and psychological fields instead of through direct political activism. Over the next several years, local chapters were established across the country, and by 1955, both groups had a Chicago chapter. However, both of these organizations, based on the West Coast of the United States, struggled to maintain their presence in Chicago. The Mattachine chapter had been established in 1954, and by the following year, the national organization reported that there were three groups in the area operating under the Chicago Area Council of the Mattachine Society. However, this presence became defunct within the next several years. (Note: Sources differ on exactly when this initial Mattachine presence in Chicago ceased to be active. While several sources state that the chapter had gone defunct in 1957, historian St. Sukie de la Croix stated in a 2012 book that the group was active in 1957, but listed by the national society as "inactive" in July 1958.) In 1959, it was revived by activist Pearl M. Hart, though this new group, called either Chicago Mattachine or Mattachine of Chicago, collapsed within a few years. (Note: As with the earlier group, sources differ on the year in which this second group went defunct. A 2015 LGBTQ history book gives the year as 1961, while other sources, including historian St. Sukie de la Croix, state that it lasted until 1962.)

While the Mattachine presences in Chicago had engaged in some political activism during its existence, they functioned largely as a social group for LGBTQ people. However, by the mid-1960s, several LGBTQ activists in Chicago were pushing for increased activism in response to an increase in harassment from police. In 1961, the government of Illinois had repealed their sodomy laws, becoming the first state in the United States to decriminalize homosexual acts between consenting partners. However, according to historian John D'Emilio, "almost as a response, police stepped up their tactics against 'public' sexual activity". This included, among other things, more frequent raids on gay bars. For instance, in April 1964, the Fun Lounge police raid resulted in the arrests of about 100 people who had their names, addresses, and places of employment published in local newspapers, such as the Chicago Tribune. Multiple sources, including Chicago LGBTQ historians Tracy Baim and Marie J. Kuda, cite this raid in particular as the main impetus for the formation of a more politically active gay rights organization.

== History ==
=== Formation ===
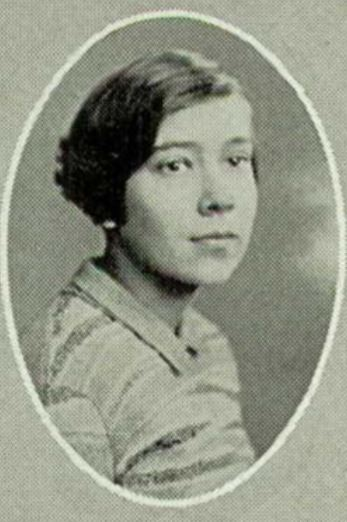
Valerie Taylor (pictured c. 1930) was one of the founders of Mattachine Midwest.

In early 1965, LGBTQ activists Bob Basker, Hart, and Ira Jones met to discuss forming a new Mattachine organization in Chicago. At the time, there were only two LGBTQ organizations in Chicago: a Daughters of Bilitis chapter and a conservative chapter of One, Inc. (Note: Concerning the Daughters of Bilitis presence at that time in Chicago, multiple sources state that the group had limited outreach and was not very active. Historian St. Sukie de la Croix states that it had been founded around 1961 or 1962 and was active through 1969. Discussing the group's activity in the 1960s, historian Marie J. Kuda notes, "A small suburban Daughters of Bilitis chapter met briefly, but Mattachine Midwest was the only functioning, proactive rights group in the Midwest" during the time. John D. Poling, in a 2008 review of Mattachine Midwest, briefly discussed the Daughters of Bilitis chapter, saying that "due to the group's small size, there was little outreach to the rest of the city's homosexual community". Additionally, historian John D'Emilio stated in 2014 that the organization had "never sunk deep roots in Chicago".) Later that year, (Note: Multiple sources state that the organization was established in 1965. However, an entry in the Encyclopedia of Chicago gives the year as 1964.) Mattachine Midwest was established by the following people: Basker, Hart, Jones, Bruce C. Scott, and Valerie Taylor. The name had been recommended by gay activist Craig Rodwell, while Chuck Renslow, a local proprietor of gay establishments, secretly financed the organization. According to the Encyclopedia of Chicago, this new organization was led by Basker and Hart, with the former serving as the founding president. In addition to the founders, William B. Kelley and Kuda were among the organizations first members. Membership was largely kept secret so as to protect individuals who had not yet come out, and early on, many members used pseudonyms. (Note: The use of pseudonyms extended to founders and presidents of the organization as well. Ira Jones was known as Mark Howard, while presidents Bob Basker and Jim Osgood used the pseudonyms of Robert Sloane and Jim Bradford, respectively.) Unlike previous Mattachine organizations in Chicago, this new organization was an independent entity not directly affiliated with any other Mattachine Society. The formation of this new group was part of a larger trend in the 1960s that saw the formation of several gay rights organizations in cities across the United States that included, among others, the Janus Society in Philadelphia, the Personal Rights in Defense and Education in Los Angeles, and the Society for Individual Rights in San Francisco.

=== First meeting ===
On July 4, 1965, some Mattachine Midwest members participated in the first-ever Annual Reminder protest alongside other LGBTQ rights activists at Independence Hall in Philadelphia. The organization held its first public meeting later that month on July 27, at the Midland Hotel, which would serve as the venue for many of the society's early monthly meetings. About 140 people attended this event. Speakers at this initial meeting included Basker, (Note: As president, Basker used the pseudonym Robert Sloane.) Secretary Roland Ketih, Hart, local attorney Ralla Klepak (who drafted the charter for the organization), and the president of the local Daughters of Bilitis organization. (Note: In a 2002 article for the Windy City Times covering this first meeting, historian St. Sukie de la Croix states that the name of the Daughters of Bilitis president was not recorded.) The organization also announced that, starting August 1, they would be offering a 24-hour helpline for members of the community to call. This phone service linked gay people with professionals, such as doctors, psychologists, ministers, and lawyers, who worked with the association. That same month also saw the publication of the first issue of the organization's newsletter. Individuals who contributed to the publication included Kelley, Kuda, and Taylor. Issues were prepared at Taylor's apartment, as she had experience in publishing as a noted author of lesbian pulp fiction.

=== Subsequent meetings and interactions with other homophile groups ===
At the August meeting, the group announced that they would be collecting queer literature in order to establish a library. Additional monthly meetings through 1965 often featured a lecture on a topic of importance to the LGBTQ community. For instance, in August, a presentation was given on the issue of sexually transmitted infections and their impact on LGBTQ individuals, while next month saw a discussion on "The Churches' Attitude Toward Homosexuality" that involved a panel discussion with several Christian clergy members and a rabbi. In October, invited guest Walter C. Alvarez, who was a professor at the University of Minnesota and a consultant for the Mayo Clinic, gave a presentation entitled "Recent Ideas on Homosexuality".

During their September 1965 conference, the group made plans for picketing at the White House the following month. Also in September, several representatives of Mattachine Midwest attended the annual conference of the East Coast Homophile Organizations, As a result of networking at that conference, several noted national activists agreed to come to Chicago that November. These individuals included William E. Beardemphl (president of the Society for Individual Rights), Frank Kameny (founder of the Mattachine Society of Washington), Dick Leitsch (president of the Mattachine Society of New York), Clark Polak (president of the Janus Society), and an unnamed representative of the Daughters of Bilitis. They spoke at the organization's November 16 meeting, after which they participated in a press conference with local media outlets. These individuals also participated in a two-hour television program, organized by Mattachine Midwest and hosted by Irv Kupcinet, and a WBBM radio broadcast with John Callaway.

Later that month, the organization held its first fundraising dinner on November 25, with sexologists Wardell Pomeroy and William Simon as keynote speakers. A social event was held the following month on December 21, with attendees donating money to the "Christmas Basket for the Poor" campaign led by Chicago Mayor Richard J. Daley. By the end of the year, the newsletter, which was distributed both directly to members and via gay bars and other venues, had a circulation of about 2,000. In February 1966, several members of the organization attended the National Planning Conference of Homophile Organizations in Kansas City, Missouri. This was the first national meeting of gay rights groups in the United States, and while the attendees decided against forming a national organization, they agreed to create the North American Conference of Homophile Organizations (NACHO) as an annual meeting of homophile activists. Mattachine Midwest was represented at the 1967 NACHO event in San Francisco and hosted the 1968 event. The Chicago conference ran from August 11 to 18, 1968, only a few days before the violent 1968 Democratic National Convention protests occurred. For the year of the Chicago conference, Kelley served as the secretary for NACHO.

=== Police activism ===
Early in its existence, Mattachine Midwest engaged in efforts to assist LGBTQ individuals in dealing with the police, with a great deal of influence coming from the way in which organizations during the civil rights movement combatted police brutality. Klepak, who would serve as an attorney for the organization, spoke at the first Mattachine Midwest meeting about how the vice squad in Chicago was utilizing a legal code regarding prostitution to entrap gay men, and by August 1965, a committee was formed for members to report incidents of police harassment, such as false arrests. Alongside Klepak, Hart and her partner, Renee C. Hanover, helped provide members with legal assistance, such as equipping arrested gay men with a lawyer. Hart would serve as a legal counsel with the group until her death in 1975. The organization also utilized the newsletter to assist members dealing with police issues, with issues often covering incidents of police harassment and publishing information on potential police raids. In their first newsletter, the organization contained a request that members petition Illinois Governor Otto Kerner Jr. to veto a stop and frisk bill, and during her time with the organization, Hart often used the newsletter as an organ for providing legal advice to members.

In late 1965, Basker resigned as president and was replaced by Jim Osgood. (Note: Sources differ on exactly when Osgood, who served as Mattachine Midwest's second president, following Baxter, became president. In different publications, LGBTQ historian St. Sukie de la Croix states that Osgood, who used the pseudonym Jim Bradford, became president in either September 1965 or November 1965.) Osgood used his office to address the issue of police harassment, and he once stated that 75 percent of the organization's job was "making the police behave". Beginning in late 1965, he made numerous requests to speak to the police about these issues, though they declined every time. In April 1966, he succeeded in arranging a meeting with the police and discussed the issue of entrapment, but the police indicated that they were not going to change their policies as they existed. In September and October 1966, the organization conducted protests outside of the offices of the Chicago Daily News and the Chicago Sun-Times over those newspapers' coverage of police raids on gay venues, as well as a refusal to publish advertisements for their group. That same year, Mattachine Midwest began to work with the Illinois chapter of the American Civil Liberties Union (ACLU), prompting this latter group to organize a subcommittee to address civil liberties issues faced by members of the gay community.

In November 1966, Osgood was voted out of the office of presidency and replaced with Tom Maurer, (Note: Also known by the pseudonym Norman Benson.) who was much more conservative and less activist than Osgood. Among other changes, the newsletter ceased publication under his presidency. However, in March 1968, Osgood was reelected president and resumed a more activist push for the organization. Additionally, the newsletter was brought back with Taylor as its editor. In September, the newsletter published an article on "Your Rights if Arrested", and in December, with assistance from the ACLU, Mattachine Midwest began a series of talks with the police department. These would continue into at least the following year.

==== Defamation case ====
In February 1970, Chicago Police Sergeant John Manley arrested David Stienecker after the latter had written in the Mattachine Midwest newsletter about Manley. In particular, Stienecker, who at that time was the newsletter editor, called attention to Manley soliciting gay men for sex and then arresting them if they accepted his offer, implying that Manley himself was a closeted gay men in writing, "If I were gay and I didn't want anybody to know, and I felt very, very guilty, I think I might get a job where I could cruise in the public interest". Ultimately, the defamation case against Stienecker, with Hanover as his lawyer, was dropped after Manley missed several court appearances, though the situation still resulted in Stienecker losing his job at World Book Encyclopedia. By this time, the newsletter's circulation was around 8,000.

=== Osgood's resignation ===
While Osgood was willing to lead Mattachine Midwest to engage in more political activism, many of the rank-and-file members of the organization were closeted and more conservative, leading to some tension. For instance, in December 1969, Osgood released a statement on behalf of the organization regarding the recent killings of Black Panther Party members Mark Clark and Fred Hampton, who had been killed by police officers conducting a raid on their apartment under the direction of Cook County State's Attorney Edward Hanrahan. With the letter, Mattachine Midwest became one of the first organizations to protest the police's actions, with Osgood saying the organization held "disgust at the manifest contempt for due process and justice on the part of the State's Attorney". Further letters from Osgood to local media outlets included comparisons between the gay community and the African American community as minority groups, further saying, "When law enforcement agencies act in such total disregard for civil rights and human life, no minority group is safe ... Those who pervert their public trust deserve to be dealt with swiftly and to the fullest extent of the law." That same month, on December 2, the organization hosted a benefit performance at the Studebaker Theater of The Boys in the Band, which was a groundbreaking play featuring a gay cast. The group sold over 300 tickets to the event, with the proceeds going to their legal defense fund.

The next monthly meeting, held on January 8, 1970, saw a higher turnout than usual, due in part to both renewed interest in the group following their benefit performance and in response to Osgood's letters. Several members at the meeting expressed their disagreement with Osgood's actions. Osgood began to express an increased paranoia that the Federal Bureau of Investigation was monitoring the organization and himself in particular, and within the next several months, citing stress, he resigned as president of Mattachine Midwest. However, Osgood would remain active in the organization for the next several years, including writing for the newsletter as late as 1973.

=== Emergence of the gay liberation movement ===
According to historian John D. Poling, Mattachine Midwest reached its peak in early 1970. That year, the newsletter boasted a circulation of about 8,000, while their helpline in the late 1960s was averaging between 40 and 60 calls per month. However, following the Stonewall riots in mid-1969, the organization soon began to face issues in the wake of the gay liberation movement. Unlike the more conservative Mattachine Midwest, many young activists in the post-Stonewall gay community were much more militant in their demand of civil rights, with many viewing Mattachine Midwest as being out of touch. This disconnect was noted by Jerome Landfield, a cultural critic for WBBM, who said in his review of The Boys in the Band performance for the Chicago Daily News that the leaders of Mattachine Midwest had "about as much influence over these people [gay liberation activists] as the Rev. Ralph Abernathy has over a group of Black Panthers whose leader has just been slain by police". Nationally, the rise of the gay liberation movement was prominently displayed during the 1970 NACHO meeting. During the conference, gay liberation activists took over the meeting and passed resolutions that, among other things, expressed support for the Black Panther Party, the women's liberation movement, and called for an end to the Vietnam War. The publication Gay Sunshine called the meeting "the battle that ended the homophile movement".

=== Shift from activism to social services ===
In May 1970, Mattachine Midwest held a meeting with several of the newly formed gay liberation groups in Chicago, with Poling saying that the leaders of these new groups viewed the older group as a "has-been". By 1971, these other groups had begun to supplant Mattachine Midwest as the most active and prominent gay rights forces in the city. Around the same time, Mattachine Midwest began to experience issues such as a declining membership and publishing debt, prompting some members to call for the group's dissolution. However, under the leadership of President Tom Gertz, who served until 1973, the organization shifted away from its traditional activism and began to offer more social services. Among other things, this included the establishment of a group to help gay people struggling with alcoholism and the formation of the Parents and Friends of Gay Men and Lesbian Women, a predecessor to the national organization PFLAG. Additionally, starting in 1970, Mattachine Midwest was an active participant in Chicago's first Gay Pride Parades. In 1975, Mattachine Midwest hosted a benefit dinner to support Leonard Matlovich, a member of the United States Air Force whose coming out as a gay man became a cause célèbre in the gay community. The emphasis on social services continued under President Guy Warner, who became president in 1975, and John Charles Power, another president in the late 1970s. In 1979, the organization reached a membership peak of 150.

=== Decline and dissolution ===
Changes in the gay community during the 1970s and 1980s negatively affected Mattachine Midwest, with Poling writing that a growth in the gay social scene during this time rendered Mattachine Midwest less necessary as a social organization than it had been in years prior. Additionally, while HIV/AIDS began to affect the gay community starting in 1984, Mattachine Midwest was slow in its response, and ultimately, other groups took the lead in providing social services to help during the AIDS crisis. As in the early 1970s, members began to discuss dissolution, though Jones, who had by 1985 become president, vowed to keep the organization alive until at least 1986, its 20th anniversary. In May 1986, the organization held a gala celebrating this milestone at the Midland Hotel, with many former members and presidents, as well as Chicago Mayor Harold Washington, making appearances. Jones died several weeks after this, on July 30. Without his leadership, and with a dwindling membership, the organization disbanded by the end of the year. Discussing the organization's dissolution, Poling states that it was caused by "the forces that doom many organizations: member apathy, lack of direction, challenging times".

== Legacy ==
Regarding Mattachine Midwest's legacy, Kuda wrote in a 2003 article for the Windy City Times that:

Someone has to be first, and MM was the first gay-rights organization to effect REAL change in the status of gays in the Chicago community. Henry Gerber's short lived Society for Human Rights incorporated in Illinois in 1924 gets the title as first, but MM was the fiery nest that incubated the next 25 years of activism in Chicago.

In later writings, Kuda said it was "Chicago's first modern gay-rights organization" and "the only functioning, proactive rights group in the Midwest until the emergence of the gay liberation movement in the late 1960s". Similar claims about Mattachine Midwest being one of the first successful gay rights group in Chicago's history have been made by lesbian journalist Jorjet Harper, the Encyclopedia of Chicago, and the Chicago LGBT Hall of Fame. Concerning the latter, Mattachine Midwest was inducted into the hall of fame in 2002. In 2005, Chicago History published their first-ever journal article on the LGBTQ history of Chicago, with the focus being on the history of Mattachine Midwest.

Mattachine Midwest's newsletter is considered one of the first successful gay publications in Chicago's history, and one of the only in circulation in the 1960s. Because the newsletter reported not only on the organization, but the gay community of Chicago in general, it is considered significant to historians, with Baim calling the newsletter a "treasure trove" of information on that period of history. Many of the organization's documents, including copies of its newsletter, are housed at the Gerber/Hart Library and Archives in Chicago.

== See also ==
- LGBTQ rights in the United States
- List of LGBTQ rights organizations in the United States
- Timeline of LGBTQ history in the United States

== Sources ==
- Baim, Tracy (2008). "Creating Community". In Baim, Tracy (ed.). Out and Proud in Chicago: An Overview of the City's Gay Community. Chicago: Surrey Books. p. 99. ISBN 978-1-57284-100-0. OCLC 212859533.
- Baim, Tracy (2012a). "All the News That's Not Fit to Print". In Baim, Tracy (ed.). Gay Press, Gay Power: The Growth of LGBT Community Newspapers in America. Foreword by John D'Emilio. Chicago: Prairie Avenue Productions and Windy City Media Group. pp. 15–78. ISBN 978-1-4800-8052-2. OCLC 821046450.
- Baim, Tracy (2012b). "Gay Newspapers, an Overview". In Baim, Tracy (ed.). Gay Press, Gay Power: The Growth of LGBT Community Newspapers in America. Foreword by John D'Emilio. Chicago: Prairie Avenue Productions and Windy City Media Group. pp. 79–140. ISBN 978-1-4800-8052-2. OCLC 821046450.
- Baim, Tracy (2012c). "The Long Haul". In Baim, Tracy (ed.). Gay Press, Gay Power: The Growth of LGBT Community Newspapers in America. Foreword by John D'Emilio. Chicago: Prairie Avenue Productions and Windy City Media Group. pp. 273–278. ISBN 978-1-4800-8052-2. OCLC 821046450.
- Baim, Tracy (2012d). "Windy City Times". In Baim, Tracy (ed.). Gay Press, Gay Power: The Growth of LGBT Community Newspapers in America. Foreword by John D'Emilio. Chicago: Prairie Avenue Productions and Windy City Media Group. pp. 357–368. ISBN 978-1-4800-8052-2. OCLC 821046450.
- Baim, Tracy; Keehnen, Owen (2011). Kelley, William B.; Harper, Jorjet (eds.). Leatherman: the Legend of Chuck Renslow. Design by Kirk Williamson (Deluxe Color ed.). Chicago: Prairie Avenue Productions. ISBN 978-1-4611-1908-1. OCLC 8085703863.
- Camp, Devlyn (March 6, 2019). "Dugan's Bistro and the Legend of the Bearded Lady looks back at a time when River North was full of drag queens and glitter". Chicago Reader. ISSN 1096-6919. OCLC 1105307753. Archived from the original on October 16, 2023.
- Camp, Devlyn (June 23, 2020). "'It was really a freeing kind of feeling'". Chicago Reader. ISSN 1096-6919. OCLC 1105307753. Archived from the original on May 31, 2023.
- "Pearl M. Hart: Defender of the Oppressed and Vulnerable". Chicago History Museum. June 24, 2020. Archived from the original on December 27, 2024.
- "Mattachine Midwest". Chicago LGBT Hall of Fame. Archived from the original on September 13, 2024.
- D'Emilio, John (June 4, 2008). "Gay Power: Signs of Militancy in Chicago Gay Politics Before Stonewall in 1969". OutHistory. Archived from the original on September 22, 2023.
- D'Emilio, John (2014). In a New Century: Essays on Queer History, Politics, and Community Life. Madison, Wisconsin: University of Wisconsin Press. ISBN 978-0-299-29774-9. OCLC 877363479.
- de la Croix, Sukie (June 14, 2000). "Chicago Pride Celebrations Part One: 1970 - 1984". Windy City Times. ISSN 1049-698X. OCLC 20341561. Archived from the original on January 27, 2025.
- de la Croix, Sukie (September 4, 2002). "Chicago Whispers". Windy City Times. ISSN 1049-698X. OCLC 20341561. Archived from the original on January 27, 2025.
- de la Croix, Sukie (May 28, 2003). "Gay History: Chicago Whispers". Windy City Times. ISSN 1049-698X. OCLC 20341561. Archived from the original on January 27, 2025.
- de la Croix, St. Sukie (2012a). Chicago Whispers: A History of LGBT Chicago before Stonewall. Madison, Wisconsin: University of Wisconsin Press. ISBN 978-0-299-28694-1. OCLC 813932704.
- de la Croix, St. Sukie (2012b). "Researching Mainstream vs. Gay Media". In Baim, Tracy (ed.). Gay Press, Gay Power: The Growth of LGBT Community Newspapers in America. Foreword by John D'Emilio. Chicago: Prairie Avenue Productions and Windy City Media Group. pp. 429–432. ISBN 978-1-4800-8052-2. OCLC 821046450.
- Dentel, Jennifer (2021). "Midwestern farmers' daughters: heartland values and cloaked resistance in the novels of Valerie Taylor". In Kassir, Leila; Espley, Richard (eds.). Queer Between the Covers: Histories of Queer Publishing and Publishing Queer Voices (Paperback ed.). London: University of London Press. pp. 77–90. ISBN 978-1-913002-04-6. OCLC 1252627692.
- Frank, Walter (2014). Law and the Gay Rights Story: The Long Search for Equal Justice in a Divided Democracy. New Brunswick, New Jersey: Rutgers University Press. ISBN 978-0-8135-6871-3. OCLC 881430362.
- Harper, Jorjet (2008). "Literary Powerhouse: Valerie Taylor". In Baim, Tracy (ed.). Out and Proud in Chicago: An Overview of the City's Gay Community. Chicago: Surrey Books. p. 59. ISBN 978-1-57284-100-0. OCLC 212859533.
- Hautzinger, Daniel (June 9, 2021). "Preserving and Sharing the Midwest's LGBTQ History". WTTW.
- Hawbaker, K. T. (February 12, 2018). "Mattachine podcast uncovers the forgotten history of queer liberation". Chicago Reader. ISSN 1096-6919. OCLC 1105307753. Archived from the original on July 31, 2024.
- Keehnen, Owen (April 26, 2019). "Attorney Ralla Klepak dies, longtime LGBTQ ally". Windy City Times. ISSN 1049-698X. OCLC 20341561. Archived from the original on January 31, 2025.
- Knowles, Jason (October 18, 2021). "Northalsted Legacy Walk highlights activists who helped advance gay rights in Chicago". KABC-TV. Archived from the original on June 22, 2024.
- Kuda, Marie J. (2000). "Chicago, Illinois". In Zimmerman, Bonnie (ed.). Encyclopedia of Lesbian and Gay Histories and Cultures. Vol. I: Lesbian Histories and Cultures: An Encyclopedia. New York City: Garland Publishing. pp. 158–159. ISBN 978-1-136-78750-8.
- Kuda, Marie J. (January 2, 2008a). "History: 'The Boys in the Band' Play On". Windy City Times. ISSN 1049-698X. OCLC 20341561. Archived from the original on January 27, 2025.
- Kuda, Marie J. (May 28, 2008b). "History: Chicago's Stonewall: The Trip Raid in 1968". Windy City Times. ISSN 1049-698X. OCLC 20341561. Archived from the original on May 29, 2024.
- Kuda, Marie J. (March 2, 2011). "The murder of Fred Hampton". Windy City Times. ISSN 1049-698X. OCLC 20341561. Archived from the original on January 27, 2025.
- Kuda, Marie J. (2012). "Queer Print in Chicago, 1965–1985: A Personal History". In Baim, Tracy (ed.). Gay Press, Gay Power: The Growth of LGBT Community Newspapers in America. Foreword by John D'Emilio. Chicago: Prairie Avenue Productions and Windy City Media Group. pp. 165–184. ISBN 978-1-4800-8052-2. OCLC 821046450.
- "Mattachine Midwest". Making Gay History. November 26, 2020. Archived from the original on May 28, 2024.
- Maxwell, Carrie (February 4, 2022a). "Longtime LGBTQ+-rights activist Guy Warner dies at 79". Windy City Times. ISSN 1049-698X. OCLC 20341561. Archived from the original on January 27, 2025.
- Maxwell, Carrie (November 19, 2022b). "Passages: Sexologist and activist Dr. Thomas Gertz passes away". Windy City Times. ISSN 1049-698X. OCLC 20341561. Archived from the original on January 27, 2025.
- Nash, Carl (2004). "Gay and Lesbian Rights Movements". Encyclopedia of Chicago. Archived from the original on December 27, 2024.
- O'Donnell, Maureen (June 4, 2019). "LGBTQ champion, Chicago lawyer Ralla Klepak is dead at 82". Chicago Sun-Times. ISSN 1553-8478. OCLC 51500916. Archived from the original on November 7, 2020.
- Poling, John D. (2008). "Mattachine Midwest: Standing Up for Gay Rights". In Baim, Tracy (ed.). Out and Proud in Chicago: An Overview of the City's Gay Community. Chicago: Surrey Books. pp. 62–68. ISBN 978-1-57284-100-0. OCLC 212859533.
- Ridinger, Robert (June 3, 2024). "Invisible Threads: Tracking Illinois LGBT History". Illinois Library Association. Archived from the original on January 24, 2025.
- Sears, James T. (2001). Rebels, Rubyfruit, and Rhinestones: Queering Space in the Stonewall South. New Brunswick, New Jersey: Rutgers University Press. ISBN 978-0-8135-2964-6. OCLC 65333824.
- Sendziak, Karen C. (2008) [2002]. "Pearl M. Hart (1890–1975)". In Bullough, Vern L. (ed.). Before Stonewall: Activists for Gay and Lesbian Rights in Historical Context (Digital Printing ed.). Milton Park: Routledge. pp. 56–62. ISBN 978-1-317-76628-5. OCLC 870228319.
- Spinella, Gerri; Gomez, Gabriel; Salvo, Victor (2015). "Illinois". In Stewart, Chuck (ed.). Proud Heritage: People, Issues, and Documents of the LGBT Experience. Vol. 1: Historical Origins to 1970s. Santa Barbara, California: ABC-Clio. pp. 945–956. ISBN 978-1-61069-399-8. OCLC 888024926.
- Stein, Marc (2019). The Stonewall Riots: A Documentary History. New York City: New York University Press. ISBN 978-1-4798-9571-7. OCLC 1124382255.
- Stewart-Winter, Timothy (2016). Queer Clout: Chicago and the Rise of Gay Politics. Philadelphia: University of Pennsylvania Press. ISBN 978-0-8122-4791-6. OCLC 933442803.
- Williams, Albert (March 26, 2018). "A year before Stonewall, there was The Boys in the Band, the first successful mainstream play with all gay characters". Chicago Reader. ISSN 1096-6919. OCLC 1105307753. Archived from the original on June 3, 2024.
- Williams, Albert (June 12, 2019). "A 'freaking fag revolutionary' remembers the early years of gay liberation in Chicago". Chicago Reader. ISSN 1096-6919. OCLC 1105307753. Archived from the original on September 29, 2023.
- "Gay and Lesbian Hall of Fame". Windy City Times. October 23, 2002. ISSN 1049-698X. OCLC 20341561. Archived from the original on January 27, 2025.
- "Passages: Jim Osgood (Bradford)". Windy City Times. December 31, 2003. ISSN 1049-698X. OCLC 20341561. Archived from the original on January 27, 2025.
- "Local Events". Windy City Times. August 3, 2005. ISSN 1049-698X. OCLC 20341561. Archived from the original on January 27, 2025.
- "Gay and Lesbian History Month". Windy City Times. October 4, 2006. ISSN 1049-698X. OCLC 20341561. Archived from the original on January 27, 2025.
- "History Sidebar: Cops, bars and bagmen". Windy City Times. May 28, 2008. ISSN 1049-698X. OCLC 20341561. Archived from the original on January 27, 2025.
- "Memorial for activist Bill Kelley on Aug. 1". Windy City Times. July 21, 2015. ISSN 1049-698X. OCLC 20341561. Archived from the original on January 27, 2025.
- "Passages: John Charles Power dies". Windy City Times. October 13, 2017. ISSN 1049-698X. OCLC 20341561. Archived from the original on January 27, 2025.
- "Generation Stonewall, the courage of generations". Windy City Times. June 26, 2019. ISSN 1049-698X. OCLC 20341561. Archived from the original on January 27, 2025.
- Worley, Sam (March 4, 2010). "Hyde Park & Kenwood Issue: Dance for Your Rights". Chicago Reader. ISSN 1096-6919. OCLC 1105307753. Archived from the original on January 28, 2025.
