= Fun Lounge police raid =

1964 raid on US gay bar

The Fun Lounge police raid was a 1964 police raid that targeted Louie's Fun Lounge, a gay bar near Chicago, Illinois, United States. The raid led to the arrest of over 100 individuals and is considered a notable moment in the LGBT history of the area.

During the mid-20th century, the Chicago metropolitan area was home to several gay bars and other establishments that catered to the local LGBT community. One such club was Louie's Fun Lounge, located outside of Chicago on Mannheim Road near O'Hare International Airport. However, these bars and their clientele were often subject to harassment and other forms of discrimination, indicative of the widespread culture of homophobia present in the United States during the time. Bars were often targeted in police raids, with those arrested often having their names and personal information published in local newspapers, leading to the loss of jobs and relationships. In the early morning of April 25, 1964, the Fun Lounge was the target of one such raid, with deputies of Cook County Sheriff Richard B. Ogilvie arresting 109 individuals and seizing several hundred dollars' worth of illegal drugs. Newspapers such as the Chicago Daily News and the Chicago Tribune widely reported on the raid and highlighted the fact that several teachers had been arrested, leading to all but one losing their jobs. Others who had been arrested lost their jobs and there are reports of at least one suicide.

While the raid was one of several during this time, its size made it notable, and in its aftermath, LGBT individuals in the Chicago area formed Mattachine Midwest, a gay rights organization modeled after the national Mattachine Society. The group published newsletters and operated a hotline for people to report police harassment, and historians regard its formation as the beginning of modern gay activism in the area. Ogilvie benefitted politically from the raid, as it demonstrated his hardline stance against "vice", and he was later elected governor of Illinois in 1968. However, Ogilvie lost his 1972 gubernatorial reelection bid, with gay activists advocating against him for his actions as Cook County Sheriff. The Fun Lounge raid and a later police raid on the Trip bar in Chicago have been compared to the later Stonewall riots in the impact that they had on the Chicago LGBT community.

== Background ==
The Chicago metropolitan area following World War II was home to numerous gay bars and other nightclubs and drinking establishments that catered to the local LGBT community. From the 1940s through the 1960s, the more well-known of these establishments regularly drew large crowds. However, in the United States during this time, homophobia was widespread and LGBT individuals were often subject to harassment and oppression. One of the more notable examples of this was the lavender scare, a moral panic that saw the United States government target LGBT individuals employed by the government and purge them from the public sector. Additionally, bars that serviced a mostly LGBT clientele were often harassed by police, who conducted police raids on these establishments. During these raids, many patrons were arrested for public lewdness and had their personal information, such as their pictures, names, and addresses publicized involuntarily. For instance, in 1949, members of the Chicago Police Department raided the Windup Lounge in the Near North Side, arresting 91 men. In 1951, sixty people were arrested during a raid of Cyrano's Tavern at the intersection of Division Street and State Street, and in 1962, 39 were arrested at the Front Page Lounge after detectives saw men kissing and dancing with each other. In most of these cases, local newspapers such as the Chicago Tribune reported on the arrests and subsequent court cases.

=== Louie's Fun Lounge ===
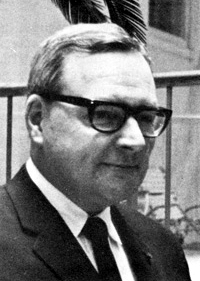
Cook County Sheriff Richard B. Ogilvie

Louie's Fun Lounge was a gay bar located on Mannheim Road near O'Hare International Airport, outside of Chicago's city limits. (Note: Sources vary on the location of the bar, with stated locations of the bar including Leyden Township, near O'Hare, Melrose Park, Des Plaines, and unincorporated Cook County. Several sources give an exact street address of 2340 Mannheim Road.) The bar had been founded in the mid-1940s and was located in an area known as Glitter Gulch, which, according to author and LGBT historian St. Sukie de la Croix, was "a notorious strip of syndicate-owned cheap motels and seedy nightclubs". Regarding the club itself, historian Marie J. Kuda called it "a rather sleazy suburban bar". The lounge had no exterior lights and no sign indicating that it was a nightclub, and people wanting to get in had to go through a "speakeasy-type door" after being inspected by a doorman. The club was the only gay bar in the area and was a popular venue, with many coming on weekends to see performances from Georgia White. However, in addition to the gay crowd, the bar also attracted a clientele that included members of the area's criminal underworld, such as gangsters, drug dealers, and sex workers. Louis Gager, (Note: Also spelt Louis Gauger.) the bar's founder and owner, was also involved in organized crime, as he was an associate of noted crime boss Tony Accardo and had even spoken in defense of Accardo during a 1960 federal court case against him.

These criminal connections and the bar's clientele made Gager a target of Richard B. Ogilvie, an Illinois politician who was elected Cook County Sheriff in 1962. He had been elected on a campaign to combat vice in the area and specifically drew attention to the Fun Lounge during his campaign, writing in an article in the Chicago Tribune that the activities that went on in the club were "too revolting to describe in detail in public. ... Gager advertises special parties which start at 5 a.m. Under-age drinkers, including high school students, mingle with degenerates to watch indecent shows." Leading up to April 1964, (Note: Sources vary on how long the surveillance lasted, with one source stating that it had been for several months and another stating that it had been under surveillance for three weeks.) the club had been under surveillance by investigators from the Cook County Sheriff's Office, with Ogilvie stating that the activities occurring in the bar were "too loathsome" and "revolting to describe". Officer Richard Cain served as the chief investigator for Ogilvie and later stated that his officers had spent several months collecting evidence on narcotics use at the club. Ogilvie would later be the one to order a raid on the bar.

== Police raid ==
In the early morning of Saturday, April 25, 1964, the Fun Lounge was raided by police led by Cain. An undercover officer at the bar stated that, just prior to the raid, he had witnessed "10 or 15 male couples dancing and half a dozen male couples embracing". Police officers blockaded both the front and back doors to the bar and entered in through the front door, where they began arresting people. One patron managed to avoid arrest by escaping through a beer storage room. In total, 109 individuals were arrested during the raid, including Gager. Those detained included 97 males, 6 women, and 6 male juveniles, ranging in age from 19 to 56. All 109 arrested were taken to the Criminal Court Building in Chicago for processing, with two police buses and three police cars needed to transport everyone. According to an article published the same day by the Chicago Daily News, Cain said his officers had found 500 barbiturate pills and cannabis valued at $500 (equivalent to $5,190 in 2020) inside the lounge, as well as men "dancing together and engaging in lewd acts".

The arrested were kept overnight and were charged with being "inmates of a disorderly house" and, in some cases, engaging in "lewd and lascivious conduct". In total, it took about six hours to fully book all of the arrested, and all were released on a bond of $25 ($260.00 in 2020). Additionally, two bartenders paid a $200 ($2,076 in 2020) bond for serving alcohol to a minor. On May 15, 1964, Judge Wayne Olson of the Circuit Court of Cook County in Oak Park, Illinois, dismissed charges against 99 of the people who had been arrested, stating that there was no evidence of wrongdoing.

== Aftermath ==
=== Newspaper coverage ===
The raid was given significant coverage by local newspapers, often with front-page stories. This coverage was almost wholly supportive of the police and the raid, with the arrested being vilified and having their private information made public. On the same day that the raid occurred, the Chicago Daily News, an afternoon paper, reported on it with a two-tier headline on their front page that read, "8 teachers, suburb principal seized / 109 arrested in vice den." The article described the lounge as "a hangout for deviates" and stated that the lounge's owner was "an avowed friend of crime syndicate boss Tony Accardo." The paper also published a photo of some of the arrested outside of the Criminal Court Building, many of whom were trying to hide their faces. A partial list of those arrested was published in the paper, while the article itself named the public employees and school workers who had been arrested. Almost all of the names published by the paper included the person's age, address, and place of work, information which was provided to the reporters by the police.

Other newspapers also highlighted the fact that several educators and public employees were among those arrested. The April 26 headline of the Chicago Sun-Times read "Area Teachers among 109 Seized in Raid on Vice Den" and included a photograph of some of the arrested. The newspaper also published the addresses of 12 people who had been arrested, all of whom worked in education, and quoted an assistant superintendent from an area school who said, "The school code clearly provides for dismissal of teachers in cases of extreme low moral character breaking the law". The same day's headline of the Chicago American read "Probe Teachers' Vice Arrest". The Chicago Tribune also reported on the raid, highlighting the "powder puffs and lipsticks" that some of the men had on them, as well as the underage drinking and the drug use. They also published the names and information of eight teachers and four municipal employees who had been arrested.

=== Impact on those arrested ===
Many of the area newspapers tracked the career terminations of some of the arrested public employees. One of the individuals whose information was published in the Tribune, a teacher from Park Ridge, Illinois, had already resigned before the article was even published. Of the educators whose information was published, most opted to resign, while one was granted a leave of absence, another was suspended, and only one, from Dundee, Illinois, kept their job. According to Kuda, there were additional reports of other individuals losing their jobs and a rumored suicide involving one of the arrested. Speaking about the impact that the raid had on those involved, de la Croix stated in a 2012 historical book that many of those who had been arrested later lost their jobs, as well as their relationships with friends and family members. ONE magazine, a Los Angeles-based gay magazine, criticized the local newspapers' roles in the firings and negative impact on the arrested individuals' lives, stating that they were performing "conviction by publicity". According to de la Croix, only one individual in the area, criminologist and law professor Claude R. Sowle of Northwestern University, came to the defense of the arrested, with a headline of the May 11, 1964 issue of the Daily News reading "Professor Assails Wholesale Vice Arrests". Sowle criticized police conduct during the raid and stated that the raid, as well as similar incidents, were for political reasons and intended as a form of harassment against LGBT individuals.

=== Later raids and community response ===
The Fun Lounge raid was the beginning of a series of aggressive raids, by law enforcement agencies including the sheriff's office and the Chicago Policy Department, throughout the Mannheim Road area. Only a few weeks after the Fun Lounge raid, police raided the Lincoln Baths, a gay bathhouse in Chicago's Old Town, and arrested 33 individuals. The intensity of the 1964 raids was reported on by ONE magazine, who advised readers from Chicago to read their March 1961 issue, which included an editorial on what to do if you are arrested. During his time as sheriff, Ogilvie oversaw approximately 1,800 police raids on various locations as part of his wider campaign against vice. However, regarding these area raids, historian John D'Emilio has stated that, "In community memory, no event compares with the 1964 action against the Fun Lounge", while fellow historian Timothy Stewart-Winter has stated that the Fun Lounge raid "became the stuff of local gay legend". The size of the raid and the number of people arrested made the raid notable during a time when raids of the sort were fairly common, with a 2020 article in the Columbia Journalism Review stating that, "Raids of gay bars weren't uncommon, but the size of this one—and the fact that eight teachers and four municipal employees were among those rounded up—made it notable". The Fun Lounge closed later that year.

In 1969, the Stonewall riots in New York City, which were caused by another police raid on a gay bar, occurred and are typically regarded as a landmark moment in the gay rights movement. On a local level, historians have drawn comparisons between the Stonewall riots and earlier police raids that occurred in Chicago and had an impact on the local LGBT community, including the Fun Lounge raid and a 1969 raid on the Trip bar, which has been called "Chicago's Stonewall". In 2019, Chicago's Gerber/Hart Library and Archives opened an exhibit that focused on these events within the city's LGBT community called "Out of the Closets and into the Streets".

The raid was considered a galvanizing moment in the local LGBT community, and as a direct result of the raid, Mattachine Midwest, a local gay rights organization, was established. While Chicago had been home to a local chapter of the national Mattachine Society since at least 1953, its membership had been low, and Mattachine Midwest was formed in 1965 as an independent organization. According to the group's founder, the Fun Lounge raid had been "the straw that broke the camel's back". Mattachine Midwest saw considerable growth in the aftermath of the raid and provided several services to the local LGBT community, including publishing a newsletter and operating a hotline that individuals could use to report police harassment. According to historian John D. Poling, Mattachine Midwest's growth "represented not only the beginning of centralized gay activism in Chicago but also offered a sense of community to a population that in many ways epitomized the disenfranchised".

Following the raid, Cain was fired by Ogilvie for his involvement in a plot to sell back about several thousands of dollars' worth of drugs that had been seized from a drug company in Melrose Park, Illinois. According to a 2021 article in the Chicago Reader, Cain had a relationship with organized crime in the area and was regarded as the "mob's man on the inside", with the author stating that Cain may have planted drugs at the Fun Lounge and conducted the raid as a way to scare other local gay bars into making payoffs to law enforcement officials. He was later murdered by two masked gunmen in 1973. Ogilvie, meanwhile, benefited politically from the raid, as it demonstrated his hardline stance against vice, and he was elected president of the Cook County Board of Commissioners in 1966 and governor of Illinois in 1968. The raid prompted gay and lesbian activists to conduct outreach efforts to mobilize voters against Ogilvie during his unsuccessful 1972 reelection bid.. Activists in Chicago widely distributed a flyer that spoke out against his actions, including the Fun Lounge raid, stating in part that "... people were disgraced, reputations were ruined, jobs were lost, lives were destroyed and even suicides were committed".

== Sources ==
- D'Emilio, John (2014). In a New Century: Essays on Queer History, Politics, and Community Life. Madison, Wisconsin: University of Wisconsin Press. ISBN 978-0-299-29773-2. LCCN 2013033118. OCLC 1019816758.
- de la Croix, St. Sukie (2012). Chicago Whispers: A History of LGBT Chicago before Stonewall. Madison, Wisconsin: University of Wisconsin Press. ISBN 978-0-299-28693-4. LCCN 2011041961. OCLC 1043364460.
- Eaklor, Vicki L. (2008). Queer America: A GLBT History of the 20th Century. Westport, Connecticut: Greenwood Press. ISBN 978-0-313-33749-9. LCCN 2007048218.
- Enke, Anne (2007). Finding the Movement: Sexuality, Contested Space, and Feminist Activism. Durham, North Carolina: Duke University Press. ISBN 978-0-8223-9038-1. LCCN 2007014126. OCLC 1131664835.
- Geng, Annie (June 27, 2019). "LGBTQ Chicago residents during Stonewall era recall 'aura of danger'". Chicago Sun-Times. Archived from the original on November 7, 2020.
- Howard, Annie (June 28, 2019). ""Out of the Closets and Into the Streets"". Belt Magazine. Archived from the original on December 7, 2021.
- Joravsky, Ben (July 15, 2021). "The mark of Cain". Chicago Reader. Archived from the original on November 3, 2021.
- Kuda, Marie J. (2008). "Chicago's Stonewall: The Trip Raid in 1968". In Baim, Tracy (ed.). Out and Proud in Chicago: An Overview of the City's Gay Community. With research contributions by William B. Kelley. Evanston, Illinois: Surrey Books. pp. 79–83. ISBN 978-1-57284-643-2. LCCN 2010290912. OCLC 946627182.
- Lybarger, Jeremy (September 11, 2020). "Fag Rag: The '70s paper of gay political revolution". Columbia Journalism Review. Columbia University Graduate School of Journalism. Archived from the original on November 25, 2021.
- Martin, Alison (July 1, 2021). "This week in history: A raid at a gay bar". Chicago Sun-Times. Archived from the original on November 7, 2021.
- Nair, Yasmin (August 25, 2016). "Whose Gay History?". Current Affairs. Archived from the original on February 8, 2022.
- Poling, John D. (2008). "Mattachine Midwest: Standing Up for Gay Rights". In Baim, Tracy (ed.). Out and Proud in Chicago: An Overview of the City's Gay Community. Evanston, Illinois: Surrey Books. pp. 62–68. ISBN 978-1-57284-643-2. LCCN 2010290912. OCLC 946627182.
- Stewart-Winter, Timothy (2016). Queer Clout: Chicago and the Rise of Gay Politics. Philadelphia: University of Pennsylvania Press. ISBN 978-0-8122-4791-6. LCCN 2015019092. OCLC 1131664835.
