= LGBTQ rights organization =

Organization aimed at defending civil rights of LGBTQ people

LGBTQ rights organizations are non-governmental civil rights, health, and community organizations that promote the civil and human rights and health of sexual minorities, and to improve the LGBTQ community.

== History ==
=== Early history ===
The first LGBTQ rights organizations began to emerge in the late 19th and early 20th centuries. Early organizations were primarily research-oriented psychiatric organizations that took a sympathetic, rather than a corrective, approach to homosexuality. The Uranian Union was an organization initiated by Karl Heinrich Ulrichs in 1865 with which he urged for the repeal of anti homosexual laws. The Scientific-Humanitarian Committee (Wissenschaftlich-humanitäres Komitee, WhK) was founded in 1897 by Magnus Hirschfeld, the first outspoken advocacy group for LGBT and women's rights in Germany.

=== 1950s: Organizations Begin ===
==== The Mattachine Society ====
Founded in 1950 by Harry Hay the Mattachine Society (also called Mattachine Foundation) was one of the first LGBT rights groups in the United States. Its members began as communist-affiliated leftists and the society was a key member in the 1950s Homophile movement.

==== The Lavender Scare ====
Taking place from the 1940s into the 1960s, the "lavender scare" was a societal panic about the notion that gay men and lesbians were communist sympathizers. This connected with the anti-Communist Red Scare, spurred on by McCarthyism. As a result, thousands of LGBT people were fired from their jobs.

=== Early 20th century ===
Early LGBT organizations in the United States were, like earlier German organizations, primarily centered around the rights of gay men. The Society for Human Rights was founded in 1924 in Chicago, Illinois, by Henry Gerber, who was inspired by Hirschfeld's work in Germany and produced the first gay-rights-oriented publication in the US, Friendship and Freedom. The Society for Human organization was short-lived, due to some members' arrests for "obscenity." Though the charges were dropped, the fees associated made Gerber file for bankruptcy. The first national gay rights organization, the Mattachine Society, was formed in 1951, was created by Harry Hay.

The first lesbian rights organization in the US was founded in 1955. The Daughters of Bilitis was founded in San Francisco, California, by activist couple Del Martin and Phyllis Lyon. In 1965, The Imperial Council of San Francisco was formed by José Sarria. In 1966, National Transsexual Counseling Unit was formed in San Francisco.

=== Post-Stonewall ===
In the wake of the Stonewall riots, LGBTQ organizations began to flourish around the United States, including politically active organizations. Many of these organizations formed in the early 70s were particularly militant in their approaches. As well as militant social justice groups forming, groups dedicated towards all aspects of gay living. It was in this era that the Rainbow Flag was created by gay activist Gilbert Baker. The Alice B. Toklas LGBTQ Democratic Club was founded in 1971 by Martin & Lyon, as well as activists Beth Elliot and Ben Foster. In 1976, Harvey Milk founded a splinter organization known as the San Francisco Gay Democratic Club. In the 1980s LGBT organizations were happening in many aspects of culture from medical and dental to housing. At the same time, organization in this period was done within city centers the eventual strength of the organization led to more political parties building coalitions with these LGBT organizations.

==== AIDS crisis ====
In 1981, American doctors began using gay-related immune deficiency (GRID) as a term for what would later be called acquired immunodeficiency syndrome (AIDS). In the 1980s the syndrome was colloquially referred to as the gay plague, and other terms related to sexual practises of gay men. This linked the virus to gay identity to many. The CDC has used acquired immunodeficiency syndrome (AIDS) since 1982. The Reagan presidential administration did not mention the term "AIDS" until 1985 in his second term. Despite this, a member of his administration's press corp, Lester Kinsolving, would often make homophobic comments or jokes in the years between 1981 and 1985.

=== 21st century ===
The twenty-first century saw a dramatic rise in LGBTQ organizations and acceptance in the U.S.

Tremendous progress has been made over the beginning of the 21st century, though equal rights are only beginning for the LGBT community. Some notable organizations have had an impact for almost half a century and are still cornerstones today, including the Human Rights Campaign. They stand for equal rights and have advocated for the legalization of same-sex marriage since 1995. The Human Rights Campaign has recently elected its first Black and Queer president (University of Missouri alumnae), Kelley Robinson. The National Black Justice Coalition has been monumental in advocacy for the Black LGBTQ community. They have been influential in policy-making and community outreach/education since 2003. Starting in 1998, The Trevor Project began their mission of ending death by suicide in the LGBTQ community. This organization is now a leading crisis intervention service nationwide.

In 2022 Ford Foundation doubled investment for trans organizations.

== See also ==
- List of LGBTQ-related organizations
