= John D'Emilio LGBTQ History Dissertation Award =

The John D'Emilio LGBTQ History Dissertation Award is presented annually by the Organization of American Historians (OAH) to the author of the best dissertation accepted for a doctoral degree the preceding year in U.S. LGBTQ history.

The award was established in 2016 and has been awarded every year since 2017. It is named for John D'Emilio, whom the OAH called "a pioneer" in the field.

== Recipients ==
The award recipients, the institution that accepted the dissertation, and its title have been:

- 2017: Ian Baldwin, "Family, Housing, and the Political Geography of Gay Liberation in Los Angeles County, 1960–1986", University of Nevada, Las Vegas
- 2018: Chelsea Del Rio, "'That Women Could Matter': Building Lesbian Feminism in California, 1955–1982", University of Michigan
- 2019: Scott De Orio, "Punishing Queer Sexuality in the Age of LGBT Rights", University of Michigan
- 2020: Caroline Radesky, "Feeling Historical: Same-Sex Desire and Historical Imaginaries, 1880–1920", University of Iowa
- 2021: Elisabeth Frances George, "Lesbian and Gay Life in the Queen City and Beyond: Resistance, Space, and Community Mobilization in the Southwest Missouri Ozarks", SUNY Buffalo
- 2022: Beans Velocci, "Binary Logic: Race, Expertise, and the Persistence of Uncertainty in American Sex Research", Yale University
- 2023: Austin Randall Williams, “The Ordinance Project: Commemorating Kansas City’s LGBTQ Landmark Legislation”, University of Missouri–Kansas City.
- 2024: Nora M. Kassner, “Hard to Place: Gay and Lesbian Foster Families and the Remaking of U.S. Family Policy”, University of California, Santa Barbara. (Honorable Mention: Mori Reithmayr, “Community before Liberation: Theorizing Gay Resistance in San Francisco, 1953–1969”, University of Oxford.)
- 2025: Shay Ryan Olmstead, "'Refuse to Run Away’: Transsexual Workers Fight for Civil Rights, 1969–1992," University of Massachusetts Amherst. (Honorable Mention: Vic Overdorf, Indiana University.)
