= Ralla Klepak =

American attorney and activist (1936–2019)

- Klepak in an undated photograph
- Born: December 20, 1936; Chicago, Illinois, United States
- Died: April 25, 2019 (aged 82); Chicago, Illinois, United States
- Education: Northwestern University; John Marshall Law School
- Occupation: Attorney
- Honours: Chicago LGBT Hall of Fame (2017)

Ralla Klepak (December 20, 1936 – April 25, 2019) was an attorney and gay rights activist in Chicago. During her career, she represented hundreds of gay men in cases that often involved public indecency or entrapment and defended the proprietors of gay bars. Additionally, she drafted the charter for Mattachine Midwest, a gay rights organization and served pro bono as the group's attorney. She was inducted into the Chicago LGBT Hall of Fame in 2017.

== Early life ==
Ralla Klepak was born in Chicago on December 20, 1936. Her father was an attorney at law. She grew up in a Jewish neighborhood in the city's West Side district and attended Senn High School. As a young adult, she studied drama at Northwestern University. Around this same time, she sometimes performed as a singer at the Edgewater Beach Hotel. She received a doctorate from the university in child care. She later taught reading and English as a second language classes while taking night classes at the John Marshall Law School.

== Law career ==
=== LGBTQ activism ===
"In Chicago in 1968, this harassment came from the political machine of Mayor Richard J. Daley combined with the power of the Catholic Church. Raids were frequent, and often being arrest in a raid meant that often a person's name, home address, and employer were published in the newspaper. People lost their jobs; families were torn apart, just terrible things. The charges might be disorderly conduct or public indecency, and this was if a person was simply in the bar."

— Klepak, discussing the harassment of LGBTQ individuals in a 2018 interview with the Windy City Times

Klepak began practicing law in 1964. As a lawyer, she primarily focused on matters relating to social justice, especially concerning the city's LGBTQ community. She drafted the charter for Mattachine Midwest, a gay rights organization, and additionally performed pro bono work as their attorney. Over the course of her career, she counted hundreds of gay men as among her clients, often defending them in cases regarding public indecency laws or entrapment. She also defended several gay bar proprietors. In 1965, she defended James W. Flint, a bartender who had been charged with maintaining a disorderly house. Flint, who would later become the owner of the famous Baton Show Lounge, later said of Klepak, "She was the lawyer who saved me from those charges. ... She was our protector." Fellow activist Marge Summit similarly said of Klepak, "She saved a lot of people’s bars". In 1968, following a police raid on the Trip Bar, she argued before the Supreme Court of Illinois that the raid was illegal and that the bar's liquor license had been revoked without due process. The case was considered a major victory for the city's LGBTQ community.

=== Other work ===
In addition to her work with the LGBTQ community, Klepak dealt with other civil rights issues, such as advocating for the rights of incarcerated women. Alongside her friend and fellow activist Margaret Traxler, she would visit women in prison to provide them with legal counsel and also pushed for increased access for inmates to law libraries. In 1975, Klepak, Traxler, and Dorothy Day—founder of the Catholic Worker Movement—visited the Federal Prison Camp, Alderson, in West Virginia. Day, writing later about Klepak and another lawyer, said they "probably did more for the prisoners than any of the rest of us". She also served as the public defender in several child custody cases. She was also a teacher at the Chicago-Kent College of Law.

== Personal life and death ==
Aside from her work as a lawyer, Klepak also operated a drag bar, which she had become the owner of in the late 1960s. She spent winters in St. Petersburg, Florida, and was a fan of jazz music and theatre. On April 25, 2019, at the age of 82, she died at the Advocate Illinois Masonic Medical Center in Chicago. According to a friend, she had been complaining of stomach pain in the previous days and, upon visiting the hospital, the doctors reported that she was experiencing kidney failure, with several other organs also failing. Her official cause of death was multiple organ failure. A memorial service was held several days later on April 30.

== Legacy ==
In 2017, Klepak was inducted into the Chicago LGBT Hall of Fame as a "Friend of the Community". Per her biography in the hall of fame, she never lost a criminal case during her legal career.
