= Richard Cain =

American police officer (1931–1973)

- Born: October 4, 1931; Chicago, Illinois, U.S.
- Died: December 20, 1973 (aged 42); Chicago, Illinois, U.S.
- Resting place: Holy Sepulchre Cemetery; 41.689372°N 87.771133°W
- Police career
- Country: United States
- Department: Chicago Police Department; Cook County Sheriff's Department
- Service years: 1951–1960; 1962–1964
- Rank: Sworn in as an officer: 1951; Chief Investigator: 1962

Richard Cain (October 4, 1931 – December 20, 1973), also known as Richard Scalzitti, was a notoriously corrupt Chicago police officer and a close associate of Mafia boss Sam Giancana.

== Early life ==
Richard Cain was born to John and Lydia (née Scully) Cain – who were Italian-American and Irish-American, respectively – in Chicago, Illinois. Cain was raised in Chicago and Michigan after his parents divorced. He joined the U.S. Army at the age of 17 and was stationed in the United States Virgin Islands from 1947 to 1950. While there, he became fluent in Spanish. Before returning to Chicago in 1951, Cain worked as an investigator at the Burns Detective Agency in Dallas, Texas.

Despite his grandfather having been a prominent sewer contractor who was killed by the Chicago Outfit in Little Italy, in 1928, Cain would later become a close associate of Sam Giancana. While Cain worked as an officer in the Chicago Police Department (CPD) during the mid-1950s, he served as a bagman between corrupt police officials and the Outfit.

== Double deal and disgrace ==
Taking a leave of absence from the CPD in 1960, Cain took a temporary assignment as part of the investigation team assembled by Assistant U.S. Attorney Richard Ogilvie to prosecute then-Outfit boss Anthony Accardo.

In media interviews, Cain alluded to having been deported from Mexico in 1961 following an arrest for taking part in unauthorized CIA operations to train Cuban-Americans for the Bay of Pigs invasion. After his death, "Washington sources" confirmed "off-the-record" that these claims were true. He also claimed to have worked with the U.S. State Department "tracing the flow of American money into Communist hands."

Cain returned to Chicago in early 1962 to support Ogilvie in his campaign for Cook County Sheriff. Upon his election, Sheriff Ogilvie hired Cain as chief investigator of the Cook County Sheriff's Office. During this time, Cain led the investigation that resulted in the notorious Fun Lounge police raid. In 1964, Cain was fired for lying to a grand jury regarding his involvement in a scheme to re-sell confiscated drugs back to known criminals. He was subsequently convicted of perjury and served six months in prison concurrent with a four-year sentence from 1968 for being an accessory to bank robbery. Cain was paroled in 1971.

== Informant and murder victim ==
After parole, Cain made "frequent trips" to and from Mexico as Sam Giancana's courier and financial adviser. Cain became a key figure in Giancana's money skimming from casinos in Central America and Iran. During this time, conspiring to control the city's illegal gambling operations, he began working as an FBI informant for Agent William F. Roemer, allegedly muscling out his rivals by revealing their operations to federal authorities.

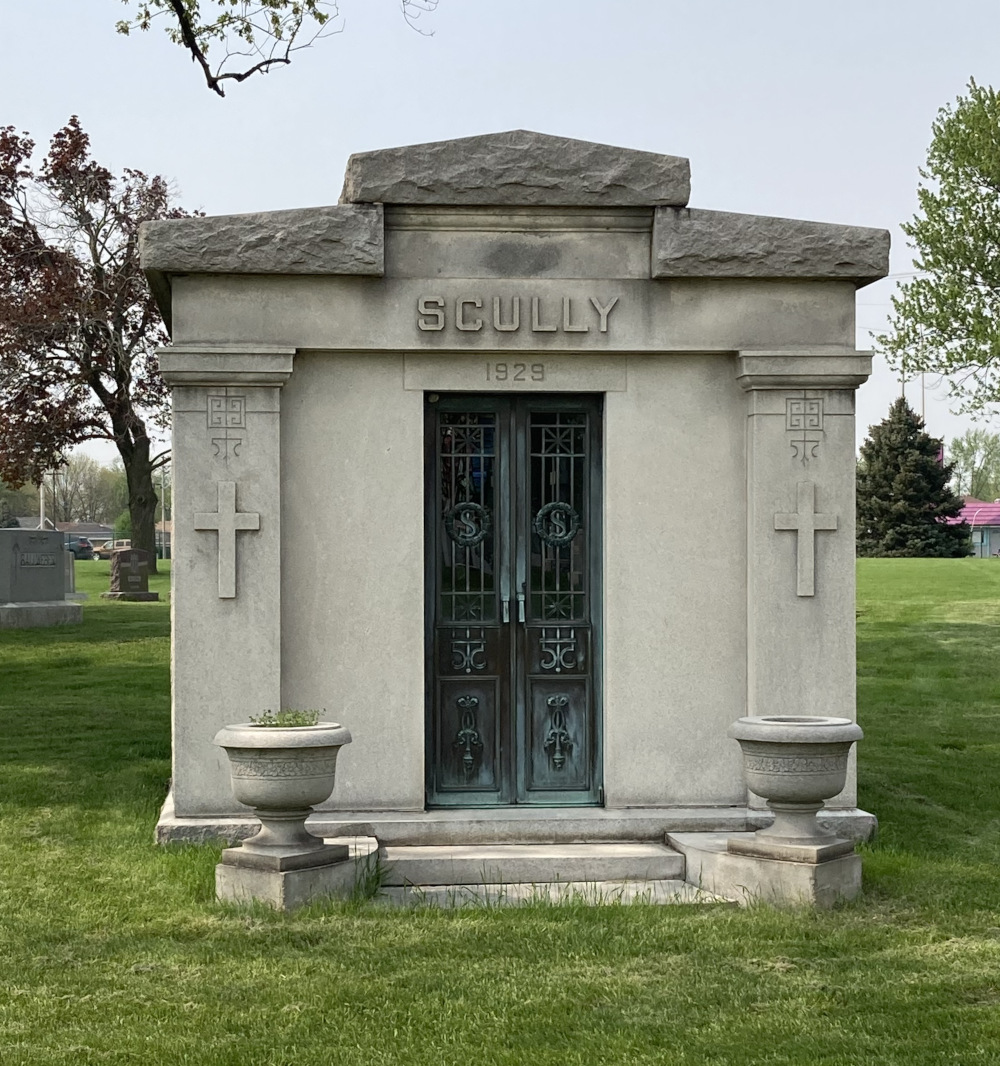
Scully family mausoleum at Holy Sepulchre Cemetery

On December 20, 1973, Cain was killed by masked gunmen in Rose's Sandwich Shop in Chicago. Witnesses reported that no more than 15 minutes before the attack Cain had been talking with four other men who were not present when the gunmen arrived. Two of these four men were reported to have left using a back door. At the time of the gunmen's arrival, Cain was seen talking with an unidentified woman in black. The gunmen carried a shotgun, a pistol, and a two-way radio that they used to communicate with an outside lookout. They ordered the shop's staff and patrons (including Cain) against the wall but did not speak directly to Cain. They asked several of them if they had any money and asked, "Who's got the package?" Cain was approached, pulled slightly away from the wall, and shot in the head with the shotgun. As he fell, the second gunman also shot him in the head. Cain's assailants reportedly removed an item from one of his pockets before fleeing. The unidentified woman left at the same time as the gunmen.

Cain was interred in the Scully family mauseoleum at Holy Sepulchre Cemetery in Alsip, Illinois.

== Possible murder motives ==
During the early 1970s, Cain became involved in a burglary ring masterminded by Outfit capo Marshall Caifano. It has been speculated that Caifano had learned of Cain's informant status and had received permission from Accardo to murder Cain. Caifano was reported to have been in Rose's Sandwich Shop only two hours before Cain's murder. After Cain's death, the Chicago Tribune reported that Cain had once bugged Caifano's bedroom.

Cain was also reported to have been "arguing violently" with senior Outfit figure Gus Alex shortly before Cain's death over Cain's plans to organize 12-day gambling cruises for Chicago high-rollers off the Florida coast.

Several Chicago Tribune articles printed in the days after Cain's death reported speculation by investigators that Cain's murder was in retaliation for the murder of Sam DeStefano the previous April.

== Alleged involvement in the JFK assassination ==
According to a biography of Sam Giancana written by his family, Giancana told his younger brother that it was Cain and Charles Nicoletti, not Lee Harvey Oswald, who were in the Texas School Book Depository on November 22, 1963. According to Michael J. Cain, there was no evidence to support the rumors that his half-brother was directly involved in the assassination of John F. Kennedy as a gunman.

Richard Cain was at the Criminal Courts Building 26th & California, Chicago, Illinois the day of the Kennedy assassination - per John J. Flood who worked with Richard Cain. According to historian Lamar Waldron in his book The Hidden History of the JFK Assassination (2013), Richard Cain did not shoot the president but acted as an informant on behalf of mobster John Roselli for the Chicago assassination attempt planned for November 2, 1963.

== See also ==
- List of homicides in Illinois § Organized crime
- List of unsolved murders (1900–1979)
