= Bob Basker =

American civil rights activist (1918–2001)

Robert Sloan Basker, commonly known as Bob Basker (born Solomon Basker; September 30, 1918, in East Harlem, New York City – April 6, 2001) was a civil rights activist. He first became active in the student peace movement in the 1930s and was politically active throughout his life.

== Activism ==
Raised in an Orthodox Jewish home, Basker joined the US Army in December 1941, after the attack on Pearl Harbor deeply affected him. It was at this time in his life that he changed his name to Robert (Bob) Basker. After his tour of duty and honorable discharge, Basker became active in the Civil Rights and Anti-Vietnam War Movements. In 1961, Basker was responsible for securing a home for the first black family in the all-white suburb of Skokie, Illinois, and was instrumental in the struggle for integrated housing. In 1965, Basker, who was gay co-founded Mattachine Midwest, one of the first homosexual rights organizations in America, and was its first president under the assumed name Bob Sloane. As an active Progressive member of the Democratic Party, Basker had a unique talent for forming coalitions with both organizations and influential individuals. As a fighter for civil rights, he was an active member of many organizations, including the National Organization for Women, the NAACP, the American Civil Liberties Union, Veterans For Peace, and was a Charter Officer of the Alexander Hamilton Post #448 of the American Legion. Aside from championing the issue of LGBT equality, Basker also fought for prisoners' rights, the legalization of medical marijuana, and the availability of abortion. In the final years of his life, he was employed by the San Francisco District Attorney’s office.

== Later life ==
On September 28, 1998, the San Francisco Board of Supervisors passed a resolution commending Basker on his 80th birthday for his years of commitment and service to the citizens of San Francisco and the Gay/Lesbian/Bisexual/Transgender community of San Francisco. He was also recognized as a long time activist for labor, gay rights, and medical marijuana. Basker drew together a variety of groups to work together for the common cause of getting California voters to pass the 1996 medical marijuana law, Proposition 215. Basker died April 6, 2001, of heart failure at age 82. On April 9, 2001, the San Francisco Board of Supervisors adjourned its meeting out of respect to his memory.

== Recognition ==
- Chicago LGBT Hall of Fame (1993)
