= Henry Gerber House =

Chicago home of early U.S. LGBT rights pioneer

- U.S. National Register of Historic Places
- U.S. National Historic Landmark
- U.S. Historic district – Contributing property
- Chicago Landmark
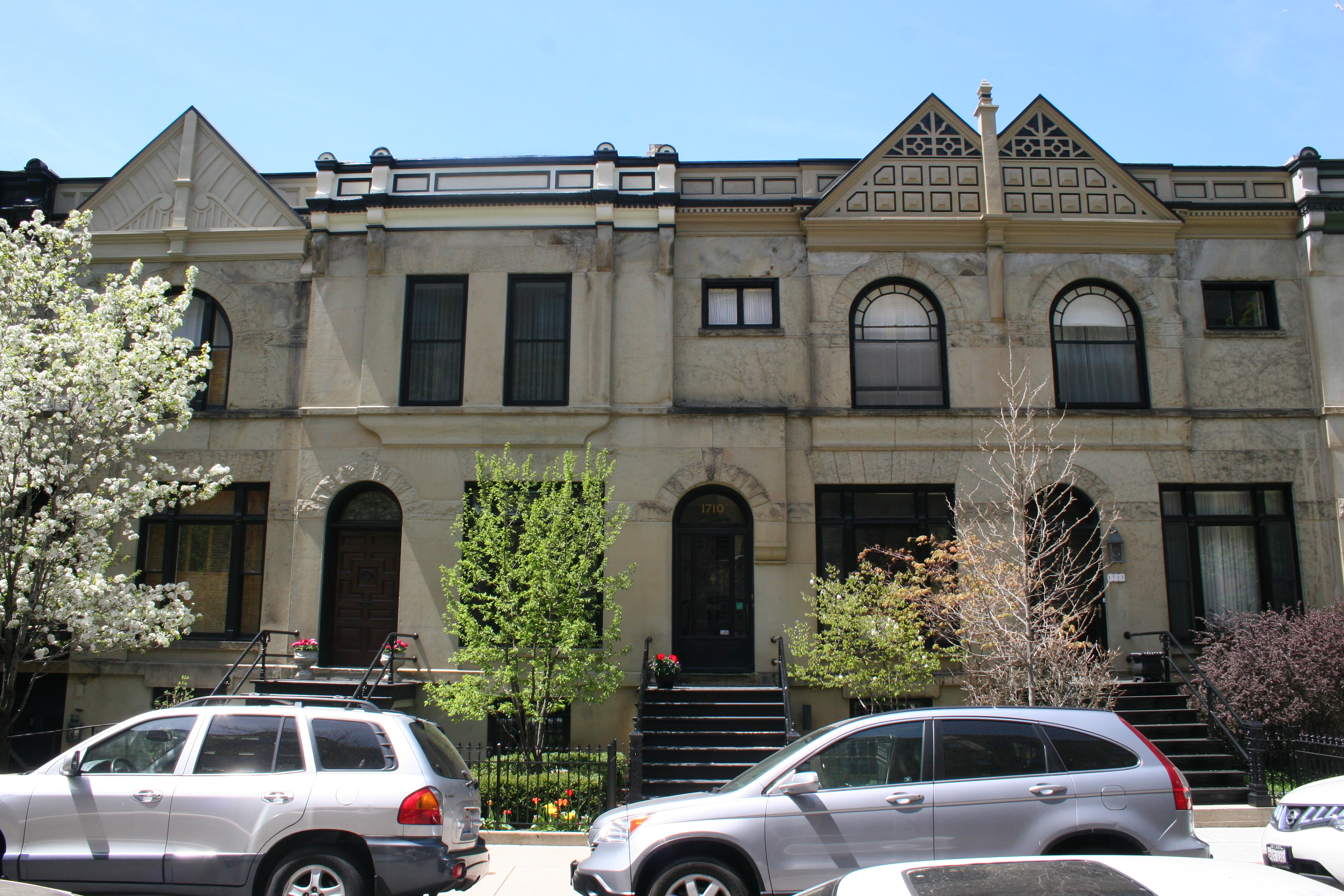
- East (front) elevation, 2013
- Location: 1704 N Crilly Court, Chicago, Illinois, United States
- Coordinates: 41°54′47″N 87°38′9″W
- Built: 1885
- Architectural style: Queen Anne
- Part of: Old Town Triangle Historic District (ID8400034)
- NRHP reference No.: 15000584

Significant dates
- Added to NRHP: July 21, 2015
- Designated NHL: July 21, 2015
- Designated CP: November 8, 1984
- Designated CHICL: June 6, 2001

The Henry Gerber House is located on North Crilly Court in the Old Town neighborhood of Chicago, Illinois, United States. It is a single-family brick row house built in 1885 in the Queen Anne style, mostly intact from that time. In the 1920s it housed the apartment occupied by German-born Henry Gerber, founder of the short-lived Society for Human Rights, which was incorporated in Illinois as the first American organization working for gay rights. Inspired by nascent gay-rights organizations he had seen in Germany, Gerber held meetings here and published newsletters, the first known gay civil rights periodicals in the country, for a year until the Chicago police raided the house in 1925.

The Gerber House was recognized as a contributing property to the Old Town Triangle Chicago Landmark District when that was established by the city in 1977, and then when it was listed as a historic district on the National Register of Historic Places in 1984. The building was designated a Chicago Landmark in 2001. In June 2015 it was named a National Historic Landmark.

== Building ==
The house is located amidst a row of similar houses on North Crilly Court, a side street in Old Town, in the Lincoln Park community area, just north of West Eugenie Street a block and a half west of Lincoln Park itself and a block north of West North Avenue (Illinois Route 64). The surrounding neighborhood is urban and densely developed, primarily with attached residential two-story houses built in the late 19th century in the architectural styles of that era, on streets lined with shade trees. Reflecting the proximity of Lake Michigan, the neighborhood is flat.

The building itself is similar to its attached neighbors. A small garden, surrounded by a wrought iron fence, buffers the house from the sidewalk. It is a brick structure, faced in masonry, built on an exposed high brick foundation rising two stories to a flat roof with a small gable on the south. The 63-foot-wide (19 m) east (front) facade has two asymmetrically placed bays.

=== Exterior ===
From the basement level, a casement window with projecting lintel looks out on the garden. A projecting string course separates the basement from the first floor. On the south, stone stairs on the south side of the front garden rise to a small porch in front of the main entrance. Above the door is a round-arched transom window with :1710" in gold lettering, itself surrounded by a round stone arch of rusticated voussoirs with a keystone; a similarly rusticated course continues along the facade to the neighboring houses. On its north is a recessed tripartite single-paned window with sidelights and transom topped by a lintel of splayed rusticated blocks.

Another stringcourse separates the first and second floors. It also serves as the sill for the arched north window, with smaller rectangular panes filling the edge of the arch. It has the same rusticated arch treatment as the main entrance. On its south is a two-pane horizontal casement window with a plain stone sill.

Above both second-story windows is a molded frieze. The roofline treatment is different. Topping the frieze on the south side is a dentilled cornice below a paneled metal parapet. To its north, above the arched window, is a gable decorated with peaked paneling in its lower portion and a decorative pattern in the apex. On its north, separating a similar gable on the neighboring house, is a molded finial-topped square pillar rising from a corbel below the frieze. The roof itself is flat, with some modern membrane and mechanical equipment.

At the west (rear) the house narrows to 28 feet (8.5 m) wide. Attached to it is a wooden deck, 16 by 9 feet (4.9 by 2.7 m), that does not appear to be original to the house. However, it too is consistent with the other houses in the area.

=== Interior ===
The main entrance is a wooden paneled door with a brass knocker. The arched vestibule it opens into has the original floor tiles. Another transomed doorway opens into the living room, with a fireplace on the north wall.

An arched entryway leads into the dining room, with an alcove cut into the south wall beneath a staircase. To its west, towards the rear of the house, is the kitchen, with modern sliding glass doors leading out to the deck. Staircases, both original, lead from the rear to the upper floor and basement level.

In the basement, drywall covers the original exposed brick walls, laid in running bond, and has also been used to enclose an added bathroom as part of a general modern renovation. Two original doors on the east and west lead to the outside.

At the top of the stairway to the upper floor is a modern skylight. It is between the two original bedrooms, one of which is now used as an office. In the master bedroom, on the east side, is a small bathroom. On its north is another fireplace.

== History ==
While the house's historical significance comes from its association with Gerber in the mid-1920s, it has a history before and after that period.

=== 1833–1885: Development of Old Town ===
The area today known as Old Town was unsettled marshland ceded to the city by local Ojibwa Native Americans in the 1833 Treaty of Chicago. It remained uninhabited until German refugees began arriving due to unrest there during the 1840s and filled in the wetlands to establish cabbage farms. By the time of the Civil War in the 1860s houses had been built alongside the farms.

The Great Chicago Fire of 1871 destroyed most of the original houses. Residents mostly decided to rebuild in the same area, making the neighborhood more urban in the process. Developer Daniel Francis Crilly built the houses on the street named after him, including 1710, in 1885 in the emerging Queen Anne Style. He and his family rented it out rather than selling it.

=== 1885–1923: Gerber's earlier life ===
Josef Heinrich Dittmar was born in the Bavarian town of Passau in 1892. After emigrating to Chicago at the age of 21, he started going by the name Henry Gerber. When the United States entered World War I against his native Germany, he applied for and received conscientious objector status. As a result, he spent the war years in an internment camp. In 1917 he may have been briefly committed to a mental hospital for treatment of his homosexuality, which may have helped him see it as a component of his identity. After the war ended the following year and he was no longer treated with suspicion as a German, he re-enlisted and was assigned to the occupying forces.

Gerber was stationed in Coblenz, where he wrote for and edited an Army newspaper. He came in contact with the thriving German gay culture that had emerged there since the 1890s. Magazines for gays and lesbians circulated freely, and Gerber subscribed to several. He made trips to Berlin, where many gays and lesbians lived openly and the culture of the city as a whole was relatively tolerant.

On those trips, he may have visited the Institute for Sexual Research, the world's first sexology research center. Founder Magnus Hirschfeld's advocacy for sexual minorities had inspired German gays of the time to organize for the repeal of German law against sodomy. Gerber would later cite his years in Germany after the war as formative in his later activism.

=== 1923–25: Society for Human Rights ===
In 1923 the occupation ended and Gerber returned to Chicago. He took a job with the Post Office and found room and board nearby at 1710 North Crilly Court. It is likely given his low income that he would have rented the smaller of the two upstairs bedrooms. The house at that time was slightly different in plan, with the first-floor dining room a smaller sitting room off a much larger kitchen, and no rear deck.

By then Old Town, known as North Town, had become more ethnically diverse, though it was still predominantly German, which Gerber would have found beneficial. Old Town then had a bohemian reputation, tolerant of those on society's political, social or cultural margins. It also had a slightly run-down character, with many of the original single-family homes subdivided into multiple-unit dwellings. There were brothels at either end of North Crilly, making it less likely that the police would care much about a resident's sexual activities as long as he or she kept them discreet.

The situation for gays and lesbians in 1920s America was not what Gerber had experienced in Germany. The few urban American gay communities (almost exclusively male) that had emerged in the early 20th century were under constant police surveillance and frequently harassed. Gerber found the Chicago gay community, centered on the nearby neighborhood of Tower Town, flamboyant but less sophisticated than their German counterparts, with no political consciousness. Seeing the United States as being "in a state of chaos and misunderstanding concerning its sex laws," which made sodomy a felony eligible for the death penalty in some states (although that sentence was rarely imposed), he decided to "unravel the tangle and bring relief to the abused." Late in 1924 he filed incorporation papers with the state of Illinois for a nonprofit he called the Society for Human Rights, giving as its address his own, 1710 North Crilly Court.

The society's name was a direct translation of Bund für Menschenrecht, one of the German homophile organizations of the era. Gerber gave little direct hint of its purpose in the charter included in the incorporation application, saying the society's purpose was "to promote and to protect the interests of people who by reasons of mental and physical abnormalities are abused and hindered in the legal pursuit of happiness which is guaranteed them by the Declaration of Independence, and to combat the public prejudices against them by dissemination of facts according to modern science among intellectuals of mature age." It was thus the first formal gay rights organization in American history.

Gerber was able to attract about six other men as regular members, most of whom were workingmen like himself. It is likely that they met in the house's basement, as its front and rear entrances made it easy to enter and leave undetected, while the single window could easily be curtained off to prevent onlookers from seeing who was inside. The group held monthly meetings, at which they decided to work for the repeal of Illinois's sodomy law.

As the organization's secretary, Gerber handled all its official correspondence and edited its newsletter, Friendship and Freedom. It is considered the first gay periodical in U.S. history. Only two issues were known to have been published; no copies are extant. Gerber shared it with similar organizations in Europe, and it is shown in a 1927 Hirschfeld photograph alongside similar German and French magazines. Another French magazine, L'Amitié, reviewed the April 1925 issue.

The society's brief existence ended in July 1925, when the police raided the house in the early hours of a Sunday morning, accompanied by a reporter from the Chicago American afternoon tabloid newspaper. The investigating officers had found copies of Friendship and Freedom, which led them to North Crilly Court. There they seized copies of the newsletter, the society's records and Gerber's diaries and personal documents.

Charges against Gerber were at first heavily prosecuted, but ultimately dismissed at a third trial since the police had not gotten a search warrant before entering the house and seizing evidence. He would never recover the documents seized by postal inspectors looking for evidence of violations of the Comstock laws which forbid sending obscene materials through the mail. The legal struggle cost him considerable amounts of money as well as his job with the Post Office, and afterwards he left Chicago for New York.

=== 1925 – present: Preservation and heritage designations ===
In the 1930s, Old Town experienced a renaissance as the artists and writers who had flocked to Tower Town the preceding decade began moving east. This reputation continued over the ensuing decades as it became known as Old Town. It became a beatnik neighborhood in the 1950s, then a hippie neighborhood the next decade. In 1963 the Crilly family sold the house.

In 1977 Old Town was designated a Chicago Landmark District. By the 1980s yuppies had taken over, and gentrification began. In 1984 Old Town was listed on the National Register of Historic Places as a historic district; 1710 North Crilly was included as a contributing property. The current owners of 1710 bought the house the following year. At some point prior to that year the deck had been added to the rear, like every other house in the neighborhood.

The new owners could not move into the house as it is; some restoration was necessary. They had to replace all the flooring on the first floor as it had deteriorated to the point of being unsafe; new handrails were added to the stairs as well. The front steps and vestibule floor tiles also date to this era.

Some changes were also made to the house. Upstairs, the bathroom entrance from the hall was closed, making it more exclusive to the master bedroom it abuts. A skylight was cut in the ceiling over the top of the upper stairs. The small sitting room was expanded, using space originally part of the kitchen to create a larger dining room. In the basement, drywall was installed over the brick and another bathroom was installed.

The owners resisted the common late 20th-century trend of gutting the interior of historic houses to create more open space within. This preservation of the original building's integrity helped it gain its Chicago Landmark designation in 2002. It was also cited in the application for National Historic Landmark status, which the National Park Service granted in 2015.

== See also ==
- LGBT historic places in the United States
- List of Chicago Landmarks
- List of National Historic Landmarks in Illinois
- National Register of Historic Places listings in North Side Chicago
