= Jorjet Harper =

Writer, editor, and musician

- Occupations: Writer, editor, musician

Jorjet Harper is an American a writer, editor, and musician, who is particularly active in the lesbian community.

== Career ==
Harper has served as entertainment editor for Outlines newspaper and writes for Chicago's gay and lesbian newspaper, the Windy City Times for ten years, she was a staff writer for HOT WIRE: The Journal of Women's Music and Culture.

Lesbomania, her syndicated column, was published in a book, as well as its sequel Tales From the Dyke Side.

Soon after moving to Chicago from New York City in 1979, she began writing for Blazing Star, Chicago's lesbian-feminist newsletter.

== Biography ==
Her grandmother, Minnie Buckingham Harper, was the first woman of African descent to serve in a United States Legislative body.

She was inducted into the Chicago LGBT Hall of Fame in 1998.
