= Chicago Gay Crusader =

American gay magazine

- Founders: Michael Bergeron; William B. Kelley
- Founded: May 1973
- Ceased publication: July 1975

Chicago Gay Crusader was a periodical about gay issues in Chicago and the United States. It was created in 1973 by Michael Bergeron and William B. Kelley, becoming defunct in 1976. The first issue in May 1973 marked Chicago's "first successful attempt at producing a serious gay newspaper", following another paper that only lasted two issues. Richard W. Pfeiffer wrote a monthly column for the newspaper.

In 1974, Lavender Woman reported that the Crusader had a large free circulation. The paper operated a gay switchboard, 929-HELP, from Bergeron's basement.

In June 1976, Philadelphia Gay News reported that the Crusader would fold after issue 27, except for an annual wrap-up edition.
