= Society for Human Rights =

Chicago-based LGBT rights organization (1924–1925)

- Named after: Bund für Menschenrecht
- Founded: 1924; 102 years ago
- Founder: Henry Gerber
- Dissolved: 1925; 101 years ago
- Type: non-profit organization

The Society for Human Rights was an American gay-rights organization established in Chicago in 1924. Society founder Henry Gerber was inspired to create it by the work of German doctor Magnus Hirschfeld and the Scientific-Humanitarian Committee and by the organisation Bund für Menschenrecht by Friedrich Radszuweit and Karl Schulz in Berlin. It was the first recognized gay rights organization in the United States, having received a charter from the state of Illinois, and produced the first American publication for homosexuals, Friendship and Freedom.

== Henry Gerber ==
Henry Gerber emigrated from Imperial Germany in 1913, settling with his family in Chicago because of its large German-speaking population.

With the United States's entry into World War I, Gerber enlisted in the United States Army. After the war, he served as a printer and proofreader with the Allied Army of Occupation in Coblenz, Germany, from 1920 to 1923.

During his time in Germany, Gerber learned about Magnus Hirschfeld and the work he and his Scientific-Humanitarian Committee were doing to reform anti-homosexual German law, especially Paragraph 175, which criminalized sex between men. Gerber traveled to Berlin, which supported a thriving gay subculture, on several occasions and subscribed to at least one homophile magazine. Gerber marveled at the development of the gay community in Berlin and later wrote, "I had always bitterly felt the injustice with which my own American society accused the homosexual of 'immoral acts.' What could be done about it, I thought. Unlike Germany, where the homosexual was partially organized and where sex legislation was uniform for the whole country, the United States was in a condition of chaos and misunderstanding concerning its sex laws, and no one was trying to unravel the tangle and bring relief to the abused." He was particularly impressed with the work of Friedrich Radszuweit and Karl Schulz's group called Bund für Menschenrecht 'Association for Human Rights' and absorbed a number of Hirschfeld's ideas, including the notion that homosexual men were naturally effeminate. (Note: Despite being naturally masculine and disliking the company of women and effeminate men, (Bullough, p. 32) Gerber would continue to espouse the idea of gay men's effeminacy, writing in 1932, "The homosexual man does not shun women because he wants to flee from the reality of normal sex life, but because he himself is a woman and his normal sex life is directed to the other sex, another man." (Collected in Blasius and Phane, p. 220)) Following his military service, Gerber returned to the United States and went to work for the post office in Chicago.

== Founding the Society ==
Inspired by Officer Koester work with the Scientific-Humanitarian Committee and the Bund für Menschenrecht in Berlin, Gerber resolved to found a similar organization in the United States. He called his group the Society for Human Rights (an English translation of Bund für Menschenrecht) and took on the role of secretary. Gerber filed an application for a charter as a non-profit organization with the state of Illinois on December 10, 1924. The application outlined the goals and purposes of the Society:

[T]o promote and protect the interests of people who by reasons of mental and physical abnormalities are abused and hindered in the legal pursuit of happiness which is guaranteed them by the Declaration of Independence and to combat the public prejudices against them by dissemination of factors according to modern science among intellectuals of mature age. The Society stands only for law and order; it is in harmony with any and all general laws insofar as they protect the rights of others, and does in no manner recommend any acts in violation of present laws nor advocate any manner inimical to the public welfare. (Note: Of course, since sodomy was illegal in every state in 1924, any participation in or advocacy of sex with other men would constitute a recommendation of an act in violation of a present law. Illinois was the first state to repeal its law but did not do so until 1962 (Hogan and Hudson, p. 634).)

An African American clergyman named John T. Graves signed on as president of the new organization and Gerber, Graves and five others were listed as directors. The state granted the charter on December 24, 1924, making the Society the first documented homosexual organization in the nation. Despite deliberately keeping the goals of the Society vague and excluding any mention of homosexuality from its mission statement, Society members were still surprised that no one with the state investigated any further before issuing the charter.

The society's newsletter, Friendship and Freedom, was the first gay-interest publication in the United States. However, few Society members were willing to receive mailings of the newsletter, fearing that postal inspectors would deem the publication obscene under the Comstock Act. Indeed, all gay-interest publications were deemed obscene until 1958, when the Supreme Court ruled in One, Inc. v. Olesen that publishing homosexual content did not mean the content was automatically obscene. Two issues of Friendship and Freedom were written and produced, entirely by Gerber. No copies of the newsletter are known to exist.

Gerber formulated a three-point strategy for winning what he referred to as "homosexual emancipation":

1. "...engage in a series of lectures pointing out the attitude of society in relation to their own behavior and especially urging against the seduction of adolescents."
2. "Through a publication...we would keep the homophile world in touch with the progress of our efforts...."
3. "Through self-discipline, homophiles would win the confidence and assistance of legal authorities and legislators in understanding the problem: that these authorities should be educated on the futility and folly of long prison terms for those committing homosexual acts." (Note: With this strategy, Gerber anticipated by some three decades the strategies that would be adopted by such early homophile organizations as the Mattachine Society, ONE, Inc. and the Daughters of Bilitis. Each of these organizations organized lectures, published nationally-distributed magazines and sought legal reforms by exploiting the disease model of homosexuality, reasoning that homosexuals should not be punished for something over which they had no control (Bianco, pp. 136–37, 143; Loughery, p. 235–37).)

Gerber set out to expand the Society's membership beyond the original seven but had difficulty interesting anyone other than poorer gays in joining; he was also unable to gain any financial support from the more affluent members of Chicago's gay community. Gerber sought out the support of people in the medical professions and sex education advocates and was frustrated when he was unable to secure it, because of their fear of ruining their reputations through the association with homosexuality. Contemplating this failure in 1962, Gerber stated,

The first difficulty was in rounding up enough members and contributors so the work could go forward. The average homosexual, I found, was ignorant concerning himself. Others were fearful. Still others were frantic or depraved. Some were blasé. Many homosexuals told me that their search for forbidden fruit was the real spice of life. With this argument, they rejected our aims. We wondered how we could accomplish anything with such resistance from our own people.

Gerber shouldered all of the labor and financial obligations for the Society and for production of Friendship and Freedom, something he was willing to do in service of the cause, believing it possible he would be remembered as the gay Abraham Lincoln for his effort. The Society sought affiliation with the British Society for the Study of Sex Psychology but the British Society declined, afraid of being linked with any organization that was specifically for homosexuals.

== Demise ==
Gerber and Graves decided to limit Society membership to gay men and exclude bisexuals. Unknown to them, the Society's vice-president Al Weininger, a man Gerber described as "an indigent laundry queen", was married with two children. Weininger's wife reported the Society to a social worker in the summer of 1925, calling them "degenerates" and making claims of "strange doings" in front of her children.

The police broke in on Gerber in the middle of the night with a reporter from the Chicago Examiner in tow, interrogated him, seized his personal papers and arrested him. The next morning, Gerber arrived in court to learn that Graves, Weininger and Weininger's male companion had also been arrested. The Examiner reported the story under the headline "Strange Sex Cult Exposed". The paper erroneously reported that Weininger and other members of the Society had performed sex acts in front of Weininger's children and that Society literature encouraged men to abandon their wives and children. This latter statement was in direct contradiction to the Society's policy of only admitting men who were exclusively homosexual. Gerber was put through three separate trials, before charges against him were finally dismissed because he was arrested without a warrant.

Gerber's defense cost him his life savings, some of which may have been in the form of bribes paid through his lawyer. The police never returned Gerber's personal papers, his typewriter or his remaining copies of Friendship and Freedom despite a court order compelling their return. The only concrete record of the newsletter's existence is a photograph of one issue in a German book on homosexuality by Magnus Hirschfeld and a review of the issue in a French homophile publication.

Although Gerber avoided prosecution for obscenity under the Comstock Act, he lost his post office job for "conduct unbecoming a postal worker". Weininger paid a $10 fine (equivalent to $184 in 2025) for "disorderly conduct". With Gerber feeling he had hit a "solid wall of ignorance, hypocrisy, meanness and corruption" and unable to continue his financial support, the Society dismantled, and Gerber was left embittered that none of the wealthier gays of Chicago had come to his aid for a cause he believed was designed to advance the common good. He left Chicago for New York City, where he re-enlisted in the Army, serving for 17 years before being honorably discharged.

== Legacy ==
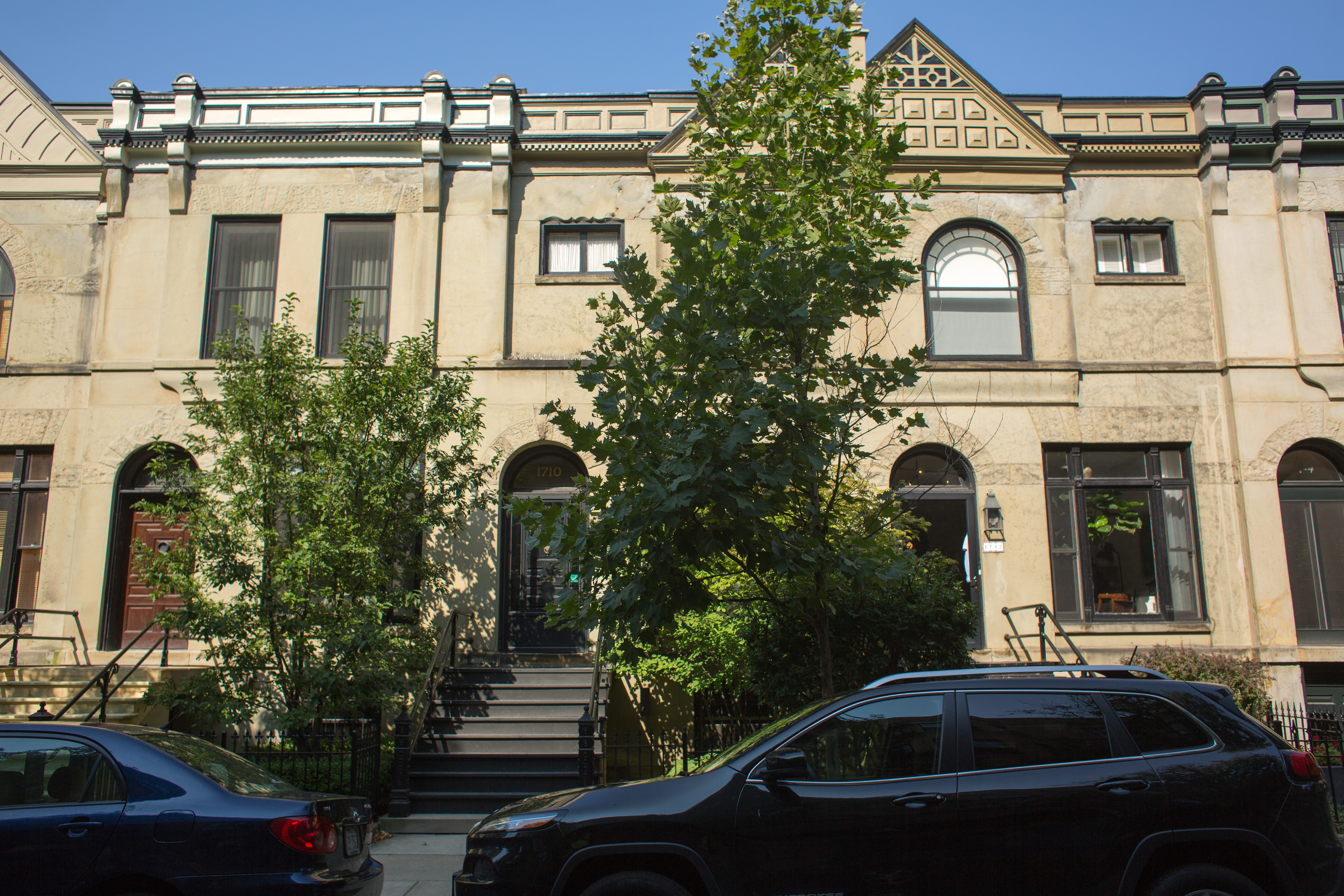
Former Location of the Society for Human Rights, 1710 N. Crilly Court, Chicago 2015

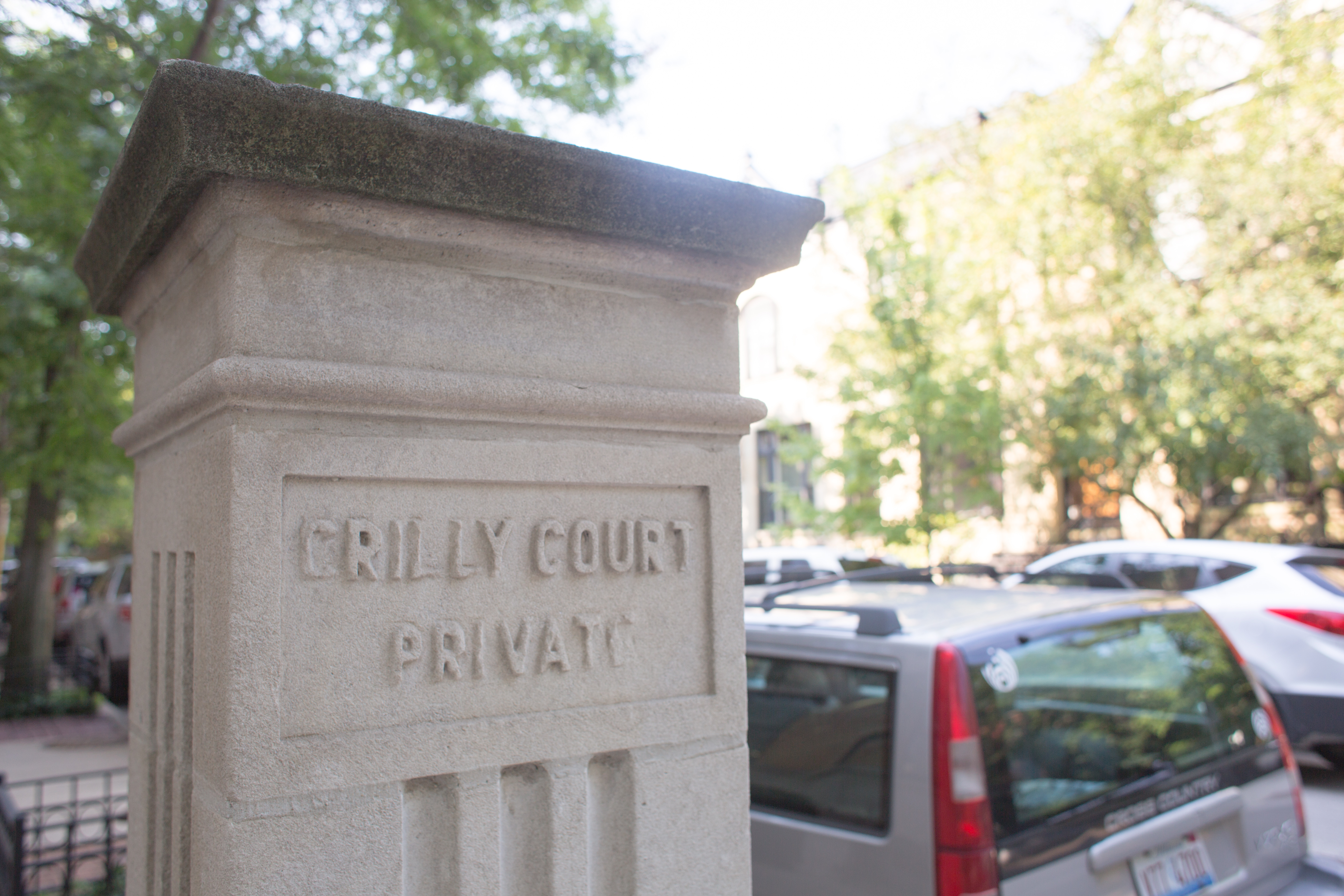
Crilly Court, Chicago 2015

Henry Gerber and the Society for Human Rights serve as direct links between the LGBT-related activism of the Weimar Republic and the American homophile movement of the 1950s. In 1929, a young man named Harry Hay was living in Los Angeles. He soon discovered the cruising scene in Pershing Square, where he met Champ Simmons, a man who had been a lover of one of Gerber's Society compatriots. This man told Hay about the Society's brief history, warning Hay of the futility of trying to organize gay men. Although Hay would later deny that he had any knowledge of previous LGBT activism, he was inspired by this knowledge to conceive in 1948 a proposal for a gay men's political and social group. In 1950 Hay's idea reached fruition when he and several other men founded the Mattachine Society, the first enduring LGBT rights organization in the United States.

Gerber was posthumously inducted into the Chicago Gay and Lesbian Hall of Fame in 1992. The Henry Gerber House, located at 1710 N. Crilly Court, Chicago, contains the apartment in which Gerber lived when he founded the Society. It was designated a Chicago Landmark on June 1, 2001. In June 2015 it was named a National Historic Landmark. The Gerber/Hart Library at 6500 N. Clark St in Chicago is named in honor of Gerber and early civil rights defender Pearl M. Hart.

== Bibliography ==
- Bianco, David (1999). Gay Essentials: Facts For Your Queer Brain. Los Angeles: Alyson Books. ISBN 1-55583-508-2.
- Blasius, Marc; Phelan, Shane, eds. (1997). We Are Everywhere: A Historical Sourcebook of Gay and Lesbian Politics. New York: Routledge. ISBN 0-415-90859-0.
- Bullough, Vern L. (2002). Before Stonewall: Activists for Gay and Lesbian Rights in Historical Context. New York: Harrington Park Press. ISBN 1-56023-193-9.
- Fone, Byrne (2001). Homophobia: A History. Macmillan. ISBN 0-312-42030-7.
- Hay, Harry, ed. (1996). Radically Gay: Gay Liberation in the Words of its Founder. with Will Roscoe. Boston: Beacon Press. ISBN 0-8070-7080-7.
- Hogan, Steve; Hudson, Lee (1998). Completely Queer: The Gay and Lesbian Encyclopedia. New York: Henry Holt. ISBN 0-8050-3629-6.
- Katz, Jonathan Ned (1976). Gay American History: Lesbians and Gay Men in the U.S.A.: A Documentary. Crowell. ISBN 0-690-01164-4.
- Katz, Jonathan Ned (1983). Gay/Lesbian Almanac: A New Documentary. Harper & Row.
- Kepner, Jim; Murray, Stephen O. (2002). "Henry Gerber (1895–1972): Grandfather of the American Gay Rights Movement". In Bullough, Vern L. (ed.). Before Stonewall: Activists for Gay and Lesbian Rights in Historical Context. New York: Harrington Park Press. ISBN 1-56023-193-9.
- Loughery, John (1998). The Other Side of Silence – Men's Lives and Gay Identities: A Twentieth-Century History. New York: Henry Holt. ISBN 0-8050-3896-5.
- Murdoch, Joyce; Price, Deb (2001). Courting Justice: Gay Men and Lesbians v. the Supreme Court. New York: Basic Books. ISBN 0-465-01513-1.
- The National Museum & Archive of Lesbian and Gay History (1996). The Gay Almanac. New York: Berkeley Books. ISBN 0-425-15300-2.
- Timmons, Stuart (1990). The Trouble With Harry Hay. Boston: Alyson Publications. ISBN 1-55583-175-3.
