= William B. Kelley =

American lawyer and gay activist (1942–2015)

- Born: 1942; Kennett, Missouri
- Died: May 17, 2015 (aged 72–73)

William B. Kelley was a gay activist and lawyer from Chicago, Illinois. Many laud him as an important figure in gaining rights for gay people in the United States, as he was actively involved in gay activism for 50 years.

== Early life ==
Kelley was born in 1942 and grew up in Dunkin County near Kennett, Missouri. He had known from high school that he was gay, and he spent as much time as he could trying to learn about being gay in his local library. Kelley also said that being from a de facto segregated town and growing up during the McCarthy Era made him interested in civil rights, and that he was a member of the ACLU while he was in high school. Kelley said that he used to write letters to the editor against segregation.

He attended the University of Chicago starting in 1959 for undergraduate studies. He said that he wanted to move to this new environment to test if he was really gay, or if it was just due to his high school. He decided he was indeed gay, and would go to the Rare Books Room at the University of Chicago to read "gay books." He said that the first "gay book" he remembered reading there was The Homosexual in America. It was two more years after his move to Chicago that the state legalized same-sex sexual activity.

== Personal life ==
Kelley's parents divorced when he was in college. His mother became a recluse later in her life, and claimed that other women in her small town disliked her because of her son's gayness. His father told Kelley that he did not accept his "lifestyle," but accepted his partner Chen Ooi and let the couple come visit him and stay in his house.

Kelley met his partner Chen Ooi at Cheeks, a gay bar in Chicago, in July 1979. The couple was together until Kelley's death in 2015. Kelley said in an interview for younger activists that Ooi was an important part in his activism, as he both encouraged and challenged him. Both Kelley and Ooi were involved in volunteerism throughout their lives, for gay rights issues and Asian immigration issues. A collection at the Gerber/Hart Archives is currently named after Kelley and Ooi.

== Gay activism ==
Kelley became involved with gay activism in 1965, after he had learned of a 1964 raid on a gay bar where the police had arrested over 100 men and 6 women, and then published the arrested parties' names and home addresses. With several others, Kelley became interested in founding a chapter of the Mattachine Society in Chicago, which became Mattachine Midwest. He was an active member and wrote for the organization's newsletter. After this he began to come out at college. He came out "to the world" in 1966 on a radio broadcast that went out around all of the Midwestern United States. He was involved with the Mattachine Society until 1970.

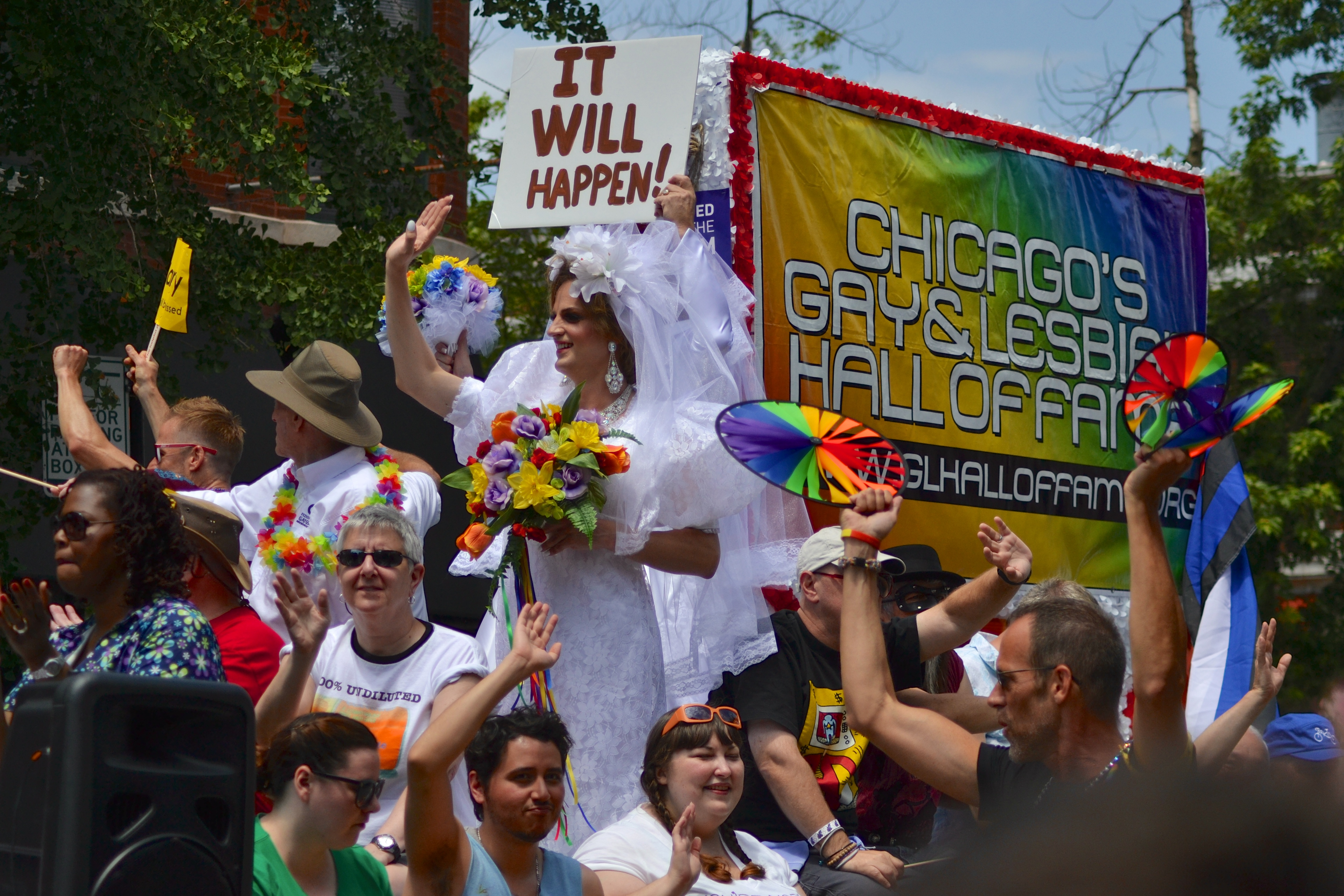
Chicago Gay and Lesbian Hall of Fame Pride float in Pride 2013. Kelley was an inaugural inductee to the Hall of Fame.

In 1966, Kelley helped organize the first national gay and lesbian conference in the United States, the North American Conference of Homophile Organizations.

After he left the Mattachine Society in 1970, Kelley formed an organization called Homosexuals Organized for Political Education, or HOPE. Shortly after he became involved with the Chicago Gay Alliance, until it ended in 1973.

In 1973, Kelley helped create the Chicago Gay Crusader, a periodical about gay issues in Chicago and the United States. During this time he also co-chaired the group Illinois Gays for Legislative action. Later in the same decade Kelley also co-chaired the Illinois Gay Rights Task Force.

In 1977 Kelley attended the first meeting with the White House about LGBT issues. Kelley presented a paper at this meeting about issues that gay organizations had with procuring tax exemptions.

Kelley was recognized by the Chicago Gay and Lesbian Hall of Fame in 1991. Kelley also wrote a letter to the editor of the Chicago Reader supporting the controversial Hall of Fame.

== Legal career ==
In 1976, Kelley began working as a legal assistant for Chuck Renslow. At Renslow's urging, Kelley went to law school at Chicago-Kent College of law, and graduated in 1987. Kelley wanted to go into corporate law, international law, or intellectual property law, but did not fit in well with the industry and could not get hired at any firms for these fields, possibly because he was so involved in gay activism.

In the 1990s Kelley worked as a clerk for the Illinois Appellate Court.

In 1988, Kelley co-founded the National Lesbian and Gay Law Association. He was also a member of the Lesbian and Gay Bar Association of Chicago, Cook County State's Attorney's Task Force on Gay and Lesbian Issues, and the National Committee for Sexual Civil Liberties, all of which mixed his interest in gay activism and the law.

== Death ==
Kelley died May 17, 2015, at age 72. He died at home due to natural causes, possibly influenced by a heart condition, as he had had a heart attack years prior.

== See also ==
- LGBT Culture in Chicago
