= St. Sukie de la Croix =

British writer and photographer (born 1951)

- Born: Darryl Michael Vincent; 16 September 1951 (age 74); Bath, Somerset, UK
- Occupations: Writer, photographer
- Notable work: Chicago Whispers: A History of LGBT Chicago Before Stonewall

St. Sukie de la Croix (born Darryl Michael Vincent, 16 September 1951) is a writer and photographer. He is most widely known for his 2012 book Chicago Whispers: A History of LGBT Chicago Before Stonewall. His works have explored the underground cultures and aspects of Chicago's LGBT community dating back to the 1670s. He has had several columns in Chicago publications, both in print and online: Outlines (now Windy City Times), Nightspots, Chicago Now, and Chicago Free Press.

De la Croix was approached by Chicago's municipal tourism authority to script and conduct the first "LGBT History of Chicago" bus tour. He had two plays, A White Light in God's Choir (2005), and Two Weeks in a Bus Shelter with an Iguana (2006), performed by Chicago's Irreverence Dance & Theatre company. In 2008, he participated as a historian in a PBS television documentary, Out and Proud in Chicago. He has spoken for organizations such as Boeing, Chubb Insurance, and Horizons Gay Youth Services.

In 2011, de la Croix was honored with an Esteem Award for Outstanding Magazine Reporter or Columnist. In November 2012, he was inducted into the Chicago Gay and Lesbian Hall of Fame.

== Early and British career ==
In the 1960s, de la Croix became a member of the liberal counterculture of the time, focusing on political, socialist, and anarchist matters. In 1967, he started writing articles for underground and alternative press. In the early 1980s de la Croix switched his attention and began writing for a number of Britain's LGBT publications: Gay Times, Vada, Capital Gay, and the Pink Paper.

== Chicago ==
After arriving in Chicago in 1991 de la Croix took an interest in telling the stories of those who had lived before in the area. He began writing a column entitled "A Letter from America" for the Pink Paper, which he describes as "a wry, humorous look at gay life in a large American city."

It was the summer of 1997 when de la Croix says he started listening to the "Chicago Whispers." He had begun working for Tracy Baim as the associate editor for a gay paper Outlines (now known as Windy City Times), and was the managing editor of Nightspots: For both papers he would report on various aspects of Chicago's gay community. Unable to find a reference which would settle a disagreement about the location of a former nightclub, he resolved to produce one himself. This led to him writing a weekly column for the Windy City Times entitled "Chicago Whispers." After six years, de la Croix did a ten-week spin-off series for the Chicago Tribune. During this time he wrote the script for – and reluctantly conducted – a bus tour of historical LGBT Chicago.

De la Croix approached writing Chicago Whispers from a non-academic perspective, and as an outsider documenting a city foreign to him as an Englishman. Instead he approached it as journalist. The book starts in the 1670s with the Native Americans and early settlers, and ends at the beginning of the Stonewall Riots in 1969. It covers art, theatre, mafia connections, bar life, and politics.

== Personal life ==
De la Croix was born in Bath, Somerset, as Darryl Michael Vincent, to a poor family. His father Stanley Reginald was a truck driver while his gypsy mother Doreen Mary worked in an engineering factory. He was an only child and grew up an hour away from Stonehenge in a community populated by many pagans and gypsies. Due to his community and socialist parents, De la Croix was not raised within a specific religion. De la Croix attended Westhill Boys School until the age of 16.

In 1971, de la Croix married Frances, his wife of 12 years. He was open to his wife and others about his bisexuality before and during the marriage. They had two children together, Lucy Anna Marie and Daniel Jon.

In 1981, he left his wife and began a relationship with Diesel Balaam. The two men wrote a satirical column together for the Emerald City News which was also published weekly in London's Capital Gay from the late 1980s to the early 1990s. They were together for six years.

De la Croix then met Ian Henzel, to whom he is still married.

=== Name ===
After going to see a fortune teller—whose prediction eventually came true—de la Croix decided to officially change his name from Darryl Michael Vincent to Sukie de la Croix in honor of the fortune teller. He added the St. years later in opposition to the fact that only the Church could deem someone a Saint. He considers himself 'the patron saint of homosexuals'.

De la Croix identifies as pagan.

== Awards and acknowledgments ==
- 2011 Esteem Award for Outstanding Magazine Reporter or Columnist.
- 2012 inducted into the Chicago Gay & Lesbian Hall of Fame.

== Bibliography ==
De la Croix, St. Sukie. (2012). Chicago Whispers: a History of LGBT Chicago before Stonewall. Madison, WI: University of Wisconsin Press.

De la Croix, St. Sukie. (2017). The Blue Sprong and the Flight from Mediocrity. Lethe Press.

De la Croix, St. Sukie. (2026). Out of the Underground: Homosexuality, The Radical Press, and the Rise and Fall of the Gay Liberation Front. Rattling Good Yarns Press.
