= Tracy Baim =

American journalist, editor, publisher, author, and filmmaker

- Born: 1963 (age 61–62); Chicago, Illinois, U.S.
- Education: Drake University
- Occupation(s): Journalist, writer
- Years active: 1984–present
- Known for: Windy City Times; Gay Press, Gay Power
- Movement: LGBTQ rights

Tracy Baim (born 1963) is a Chicago-based LGBTQ journalist, editor, author, and filmmaker. As one of the founders of Windy City Times (WCT), she is the current owner of the newspaper and Windy City Media Group. She is also a former publisher of the Chicago Reader newspaper.

In addition to her publishing career, she has also written 14 books like Out and Proud in Chicago: An Overview of the City’s Gay Movement (2008), Obama and the Gays: A Political Marriage (2010), and Gay Press, Gay Power (2012).

== Biography ==
Baim was born in 1963 in Chicago, Illinois into a family of journalists and photographers. Her mother was Joy Darrow (1934–1996)—the former Chicago Tribune reporter and grandniece of Clarence Darrow who was born in Whitefish Bay, Wisconsin. Her father is photographer Hal Baim, who is also involved with the WCT.

Baim attained a journalism degree from Drake University in the field of news-editorialism in 1984.

== Career ==
In 1985, Baim, Drew Badanish, Bob Bearden, and Jeff MacCourt founded Windy City Times, an LGBTQ-focused newspaper. Baim also started Sentury Publications to publish the paper. She is currently the publisher and executive editor of the paper. She also co-founded another newspaper Outlines in 1987 after leaving Sentury.

Baim joined the Chicago Reader in 2018. Baim resigned in 2022.

== Awards and honors ==
- 1994: Chicago Gay and Lesbian Hall of Fame Inductee.
- 1994: Chicago Torch Award winner. Given by the Human Rights Campaign Fund.
- 1995: Crain’s Chicago Business 40 Under 40 leader.
- 2005: Community Media Workshop’s Studs Terkel Award.
- 2012: Top 10 selection from the GLBT Round Table of the American Library Association for Gay Press, Gay Power.
- 2013: Lifetime Achievement Award. From the Chicago Headline Club at the 37th annual Peter Lisagor Awards for Exemplary Journalism.
- 2014: Fueling the Frontlines Awards honoree.
- 2014: Association of LGBTI Journalists Hall of Fame Inductee.

Baim was also nominated in 2013 for a Lambda Literary Award for LGBT Studies for Gay Press, Gay Power.

== Works ==
=== Journalism ===
- GayLife. Editorial Assistant.
- Windy City Times. Co-founder 1985. Owner, publisher, writer, photographer.
- Outlines newspaper. Co-founded 1987.
- Huffpost. Contributor.
- Chicago Reader. Publisher 2018. Co-publisher 2018–2022.

=== Books ===
- Out! A Resource Guide for Gay & Lesbian Supportive Businesses, Professionals and Organizations (1993)
- Kuda: Gay & Proud (2003)
- Out and Proud in Chicago (2008)
- Obama and the Gays: A Political Marriage (2010)
- The Half Life of Sgt. Jen Hunter (2010)
- Leatherman: The Legend of Chuck Renslow (2011)
- Jim Flint: The Boy from Peoria (2011)
- Gay Press, Gay Power: The Growth of LGBT Community Newspapers in America (2012)
- Vernita Gray: From Woodstock to the White House (2014; with Owen Keehan)
- The Fight for Marriage Equality in the Land of Lincoln (2014)
- The Best of Knight at the Movies (2014)
- Barbara Gittings: Gay Pioneer (2015)
- Art AIDS America Chicago (2019; contributor, with Staci Boris (editor), Christopher Audain, Lora Branch and Karen Finley)
- Liberating Healthcare: 50 Years of Resistance, Resilience, and Healing at Howard Brown Health (2025)

=== Films ===
- Hannah Free (2008; producer, Ripe Fruit Films)
- Scrooge & Marley (2012; producer, Sam I Am Films)

=== Other projects ===
- That's So Gay. LGBT history trivia game.
- Pride Action Tank. Co-founder.
- Chicago Independent Media Alliance. Fundraising organization for community media. 2020.
- Gay Games VII. Co-vice chair.
- March on Springfield for Marriage Equality. Founded 2013.
