= Marie J. Kuda =

American writer (1940–2016)

- Born: 1940; Chicago, Illinois
- Died: October 1, 2016 (aged 75–76); Cicero, Illinois
- Occupations: American writer, lecturer, publisher, and historian of LGBT culture in Chicago
- Known for: Founder of Womanpress

Marie Jayne Kuda (1940–2016) was an American writer, lecturer, publisher, and historian of LGBT culture in Chicago. Her collection contained over 100,000 documents and ephemera and her research extended to LGBT culture from ancient times through the 20th century. She was the founder of Womanpress, published the first annotated bibliography of lesbian literature, Women Loving Women, and organized five Lesbian Writers' Conferences in Chicago.

== Early life ==
Kuda was born in Chicago. As a child, she had osteomyelitis, an infection of the leg bone, and received a bone marrow transplant at the age of 8. During World War II, she spent time in a boarding school while her father served in the war and her mother was unable to care for her. The school arranged visits to the Art Institute of Chicago, Museum of Science and Industry, and Field Museum, which helped generate Kuda's passion for history and research.

After her father's death, Kuda got her own apartment at 15 and later worked her way through DePaul University. She held a variety of jobs, including graphic artist, house painter, and cook, as well as in bookstores and as a bookkeeper.

== Career ==
Kuda founded Womanpress in the 1970s, which published the first annotated bibliography of lesbian literature. She organized five Lesbian Writers' Conferences in Chicago. She wrote for many lesbian and gay newspapers in Chicago as well as Commerce Clearing House, Harcourt Brace, DePaul University, Northeastern Illinois University, and the Ravenswood Hospital Mental Health Clinic.

Throughout her life, Kuda created an archive of over 100,000 documents, matchbooks, buttons, and other ephemera to tell the story of LGBT culture in Chicago. In 1978, she began giving slide presentations to share the contributions that lesbians and gay men had made to mainstream culture. Although she never received a library degree, she was an outspoken member of the Gay and Lesbian Task Force of the American Library Association. In 1991, she was inducted into the first class of the Chicago Gay and Lesbian Hall of Fame.

== Personal life ==
Kuda suffered from heart failure and died on October 1, 2016, at Alden Town Manor in Cicero, Illinois.
