= Henry Gerber =

20th-century US homosexual rights activist

- Henry Gerber, date unknown
- Born: Henry Joseph Dittmar; June 29, 1892; Passau, Kingdom of Bavaria, German Empire
- Died: December 31, 1972 (aged 80); Washington, D.C., U.S.
- Occupations: United States Army; Writer
- Known for: Gay activist; Founder, Society for Human Rights

Henry Gerber (June 29, 1892 in Passau, Bavaria– December 31, 1972) was an early gay rights activist in the United States. Inspired by the work of Germany's Magnus Hirschfeld and his Scientific-Humanitarian Committee and by the organisation Bund für Menschenrecht by Friedrich Radszuweit and Karl Schulz, Gerber founded the Society for Human Rights (SHR) in 1924, the United States' first known gay organization, and Friendship and Freedom, the first known American gay publication. SHR was short-lived, as police arrested several of its members shortly after it incorporated. Although embittered by his experiences, Gerber maintained contacts within the fledgling homophile movement of the 1950s and continued to agitate for the rights of homosexuals. Gerber has been repeatedly recognized for his contributions to the LGBT movement.

== Early life ==
Gerber was born Heinrich Joseph Dittmar (some sources say "Josef") on June 29, 1892, in the city of Passau in Bavaria. He changed his name to "Henry Gerber" upon emigrating to the United States in 1913. He and others in his family settled in Chicago because of its large German immigrant population. In 1917, Gerber was briefly committed to a mental institution because of his homosexuality. When the United States declared war on Germany, Gerber was given a choice: be interned as an enemy alien or enlist in the Army. Gerber chose the Army and he was assigned to work as a printer and proofreader with the Allied Army of Occupation in Coblenz. He served for around three years. During his time in Germany, Gerber learned about Magnus Hirschfeld and the work he and his Scientific-Humanitarian Committee were doing to reform anti-homosexual German law (especially Paragraph 175, which criminalized sex between men). Gerber traveled to Berlin, which supported a thriving gay subculture, on several occasions and subscribed to at least one homophile magazine. He absorbed Hirschfeld's ideas, including the notion that gay men were naturally effeminate. (Note: Despite being naturally masculine and disliking the company of women and effeminate men, (Bullough 2002, p. 32), Gerber continued to espouse the idea of gay men's effeminacy, writing in 1932, "The homosexual man does not shun women because he wants to flee from the reality of normal sex life, but because he himself is a woman and his normal sex life is directed to the other sex, another man." (collected in Blasius & Phelan 1997, p. 220)) Following his military service, Gerber returned to the United States and went to work for the post office in Chicago.

== Society for Human Rights ==
Inspired by Hirschfeld's work with the Scientific-Humanitarian Committee, Gerber resolved to found a similar organization in the United States. He called his group the Society for Human Rights (SHR) and took on the role of secretary. Gerber filed an application for a charter as a non-profit organization with the state of Illinois. The application outlined the goals and purposes of the (SHR):

To promote and protect the interests of people who by reasons of mental and physical abnormalities are abused and hindered in the legal pursuit of happiness which is guaranteed them by the Declaration of Independence, and to combat the public prejudices against them by dissemination of factors according to modern science among intellectuals of mature age. The Society stands only for law and order; it is in harmony with any and all general laws insofar as they protect the rights of others, and does in no manner recommend any acts in violation of present laws nor advocate any manner inimical to the public welfare. (Note: Since sodomy was illegal in every state in 1924, any participation in or advocacy of sex with other men would constitute a recommendation of an act in violation of a present law. Illinois was the first state to repeal its law but did not do so until 1962.(Hogan & Hudson 1998, p. 634))

An African American clergyman named John T. Graves signed on as president of the new organization and Gerber, Graves and five others were listed as directors. The state granted the charter on December 10, 1924, making SHR the oldest documented homosexual organization in the nation.

Gerber created the first known American gay-interest publication, called Friendship and Freedom, as the SHR newsletter. However, few SHR members were willing to receive mailings of the newsletter, fearing that postal inspectors would deem the publication obscene under the Comstock Act. Indeed, all gay-interest publications were deemed obscene until 1958. Friendship and Freedom lasted two issues.

Gerber and Graves decided to limit SHR membership to gay men and exclude bisexuals. Unknown to them, SHR vice-president Al Weininger was married with two children. Weninger's wife reported SHR to a social worker in the summer of 1925, calling them "degenerates". The police interrogated Gerber and arrested him, Graves, Weininger and another man; the Chicago Examiner reported the story under the headline "Strange Sex Cult Exposed". Gerber was tried three times. Charges against Gerber were eventually dismissed but his defense cost him his life savings, some or all of which may have been in the form of bribes paid through his lawyer. Gerber lost his post office job for "conduct unbecoming a postal worker" and Weininger paid a $10 fine for "disorderly conduct". SHR was destroyed and Gerber was left embittered that none of the wealthy gays of Chicago came to his aid for a cause designed to advance the common good.

== Later life ==
Gerber's activities between the demise of SHR and 1927 are undocumented. In 1927, Gerber travelled to New York City, where a friend from his Army days introduced him to a colonel. The officer encouraged Gerber to re-enlist and he did. Gerber was posted to Fort Jay on Governors Island and his post-war talents as a proofreader and editor likely put to use by the Army Recruiting Bureau in the production of their magazines and recruiting publications. It was likely that such low profile office work allowed him to continue in the Army, with occasional harassment until 1945, when he received an honorable discharge.

During his second enlistment, Gerber ran a pen pal service called "Connections" beginning in 1930. The service typically had between 150 and 200 members, the majority of whom were heterosexual. He continued writing articles for a variety of magazines, including one called Chanticleer, in which he sometimes made the case for homosexual rights. It was the norm for gay writers to use pseudonyms when writing on gay matters; Gerber sometimes wrote under his own name but sometimes used the name "Parisex". Gerber continued to write for the next 30 years.

In the mid-1940s, Gerber moved to Washington, D.C., where he explored the city's gay scene, including the popular cruising area in Lafayette Park. In 1953, the editors of ONE magazine—the first nationally syndicated homophile periodical available in the U.S.—published a letter from Gerber in which he briefly recounted the story of the Society for Human Rights. Almost a decade later, in 1962, ONE published a full-length article, written by Gerber, providing a detailed history of SHR.

During the emergence of the homophile movement in the U.S., Gerber maintained a voluminous correspondence with other gay men, discussing gay organizing and strategies for answering societal prejudice. Gerber was an early member of the Washington chapter of the Mattachine Society, though he resigned after clashing with chapter president B. Dwight Huggins.

Gerber spent the last decades of his life as a resident of the Soldiers' and Airmen's Home. There he worked on his memoirs (the manuscripts are thought to be lost) and translations of German novels. Gerber was 80 years old when he died at the home on December 31, 1972. He was buried in the adjoining United States Soldiers' and Airmen's Home National Cemetery.

== Legacy ==
Gerber was posthumously inducted into the Chicago Gay and Lesbian Hall of Fame in 1992. The Henry Gerber House, located at 1710 N. Crilly Court, Chicago, contains the apartment in which Gerber lived when he founded SHR. It was designated a Chicago Landmark on June 1, 2001. In June 2015 it was named a National Historic Landmark. The Gerber/Hart Library at 6500 North Clark Street is named in honor of Gerber and early civil rights defender Pearl M. Hart.

Gerber serves as a direct link between the LGBTQ-related activism of the Weimar Republic and the American homophile movement of the 1950s. In 1929, a young man named Harry Hay was living in Los Angeles. He soon discovered the cruising scene in Pershing Square, where he met Champ Simmons, who had been a lover of one of Gerber's SHR compatriots. Simmons told Hay about the Society's brief history. Although Hay would later deny that he had any knowledge of previous LGBTQ activism, he was inspired by this knowledge to conceive in 1948 a proposal for gay men's political and social group. In 1950 Hay's idea reached fruition when he and several other men founded the Mattachine Society, the first enduring LGBTQ rights organization in the United States.

== Bibliography ==
- Blasius, Marc; Phelan, Shane, eds. (1997). We Are Everywhere: A Historical Sourcebook of Gay and Lesbian Politics. New York: Routledge. ISBN 0415908590.
- Hogan, Steve; Hudson, Lee (1998). Completely Queer: The Gay and Lesbian Encyclopedia. New York: Henry Holt and Company. ISBN 0805036296.
- Kepner, Jim; Murray, Stephen O. (2002). "Henry Gerber (1895–1972): Grandfather of the American Gay Rights Movement". In Bullough, Vern L. (ed.). Before Stonewall: Activists for Gay and Lesbian Rights in Historical Context. New York: Harrington Park Press, an imprint of The Haworth Press. ISBN 1560231939.
- Loughery, John (1998). The Other Side of Silence – Men's Lives and Gay Identities: A Twentieth-Century History. New York: Henry Holt and Company. ISBN 0805038965.
- Murdoch, Joyce; Price, Deb (2001). Courting Justice: Gay Men and Lesbians v. the Supreme Court. New York: Basic Books. ISBN 0465015131.
- Riemer, Matthew; Brown, Leighton (2019). We Are Everywhere: Protest, Power, and Pride in the History of Queer Liberation. Berkeley: Ten Speed Press. p. 74. ISBN 9780399581823.
- The National Museum & Archive of Lesbian and Gay History (1996). The Gay Almanac. New York: Berkeley Books. ISBN 0425153002.
