= Friendship and Freedom =

American gay-interest newsletter

Friendship and Freedom, published from 1924 to 1925, was a short-lived American gay-interest newsletter published by the Chicago-based Society for Human Rights (SHR), the first recognized homosexual rights organization in the United States. Henry Gerber, founder of the Society for Human Rights, started publishing the newsletter using his personal typewriter. The purpose of the newsletter was to act as a forum of discussion among gay men. The first issue of the newsletter was published in 1924, and a total of only two issues were published. Friendship and Freedom was the first known gay-interest periodical in the United States. This periodical, along with Jim Kepner's Gay Fan and Lisa Ben's Vice Versa, is described by author of LGBT-issues James Thomas Sears as "amateurish". The title of the magazine, Friendship and Freedom, was directly translated from a 1920s German gay magazine, Freundschaft und Freiheit.

In the 1920s, the United States was less accepting of LGBT people compared to contemporaneous Germany, where many gay rights organization flourished during this period. As a result, Gerber's room in a boardinghouse was raided by the Chicago Police Department in July 1925, and everything associated with the publication of the newsletter, including Gerber's typewriter and his personal diaries, were seized. Gerber was thrown into jail for three days and the news of his arrest was published in the contemporary press with the headlines, "Strange Sex Cult Exposed." All copies of Friendship and Freedom that were not in circulation were seized by the police and destroyed.

No known copy of Friendship and Freedom survives today. Despite lack of any existing copy, the existence of this publication was verified by American LGBT historian Jonathan Ned Katz through a photograph published by sexologist and LGBT-rights advocate Magnus Hirschfeld in 1927 depicting homosexual publications, among them Friendship and Freedom.
