= John D'Emilio =

Professor of history, women's, and gender studies

- Born: September 21, 1948 (age 78); The Bronx, New York, U.S.
- Education: Columbia University (BA, PhD)
- Occupations: Writer, educator
- Writing career
- Notable awards: Guggenheim Fellowship (1998); Chicago LGBT Hall of Fame (2005)

John D'Emilio (born 1948) is a professor emeritus of history and of women's and gender studies at the University of Illinois at Chicago. He taught at the University of North Carolina at Greensboro. He earned his B.A. from Columbia College and Ph.D. from Columbia University in 1982, where his advisor was William Leuchtenburg. He was a Guggenheim fellow in 1998 and National Endowment for the Humanities fellow in 1997 and also served as Director of the Policy Institute at the National Gay and Lesbian Task Force from 1995 to 1997. He served two terms as President of the Board for Chicago's Gerber/Hart Library and Archives and is on the board of trustees for the American LGBTQ+ Museum in New York City.

== Honors and awards ==
D'Emilio was awarded the Stonewall Book Award in 1984 for his most widely cited book, Sexual Politics, Sexual Communities, which is considered the definitive history of the U.S. homophile movement from 1940 to 1970. His biography of the civil rights leader Bayard Rustin, Lost Prophet: Bayard Rustin and the Quest for Peace and Justice in America, won the Randy Shilts Award and the Stonewall Book Award-Israel Fishman Non-Fiction Award in 2004. He was the 2005 recipient of the Brudner Prize at Yale University.

In 1999, D'Emilio was honored with the David R. Kessler award for LGBTQ Studies from CLAGS: The Center for LGBTQ Studies.

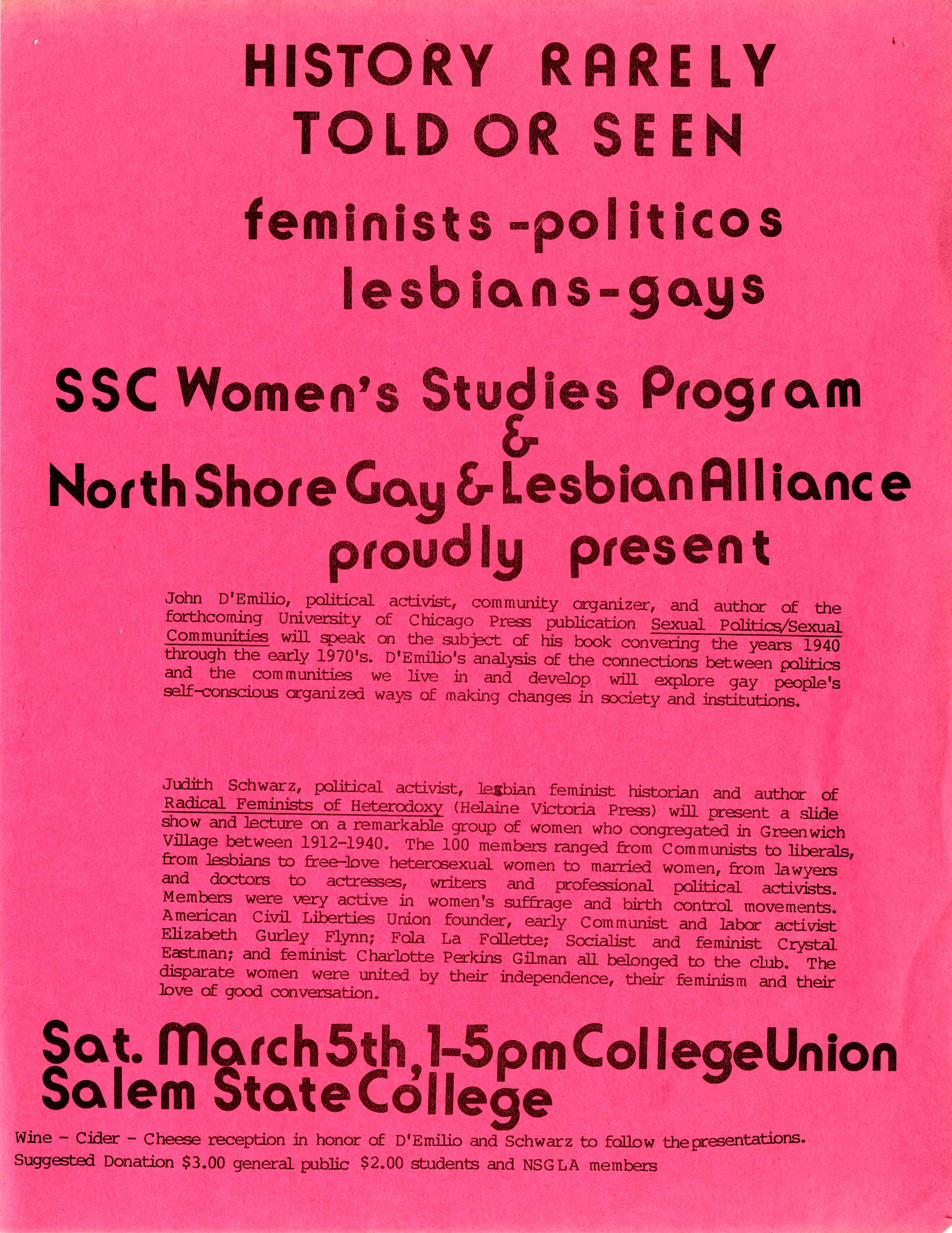
Flyer for a 1983 event at which D'Emilio was one of the featured speakers.

His and Estelle Freedman's book Intimate Matters: A History of Sexuality in America was cited in Justice Anthony Kennedy's opinion in Lawrence v. Texas, the 2003 American Supreme Court case overturning all remaining anti-sodomy laws.

D'Emilio's book Sexual Politics, Sexual Communities: The Making of a Homosexual Minority in the United States, 1940-1970 was cited in a dissenting opinion by Supreme Court Justice Sonia Sotomayor in the case 303 Creative LLC v. Elenis (2023) regarding the conservative majority's ruling that website designers have the First Amendment right to refuse to create sites for same-sex couples.

In 2005 D'Emilio was inducted into the Chicago Gay and Lesbian Hall of Fame.

He received the Bill Whitehead Award for lifetime achievement from Publishing Triangle in 2013.

== Personal life ==
Jim Oleson, D'Emilio's partner since the early 1980s, died at their home in Chicago on April 4, 2015.

== Works ==
=== Author ===
- Sexual Politics, Sexual Communities: The Making of a Homosexual Minority in the United States, 1940-1970 (University of Chicago Press, 1983; 2nd edition with a new preface and afterword, 1998)
- Making Trouble: Essays on Gay History, Politics, and the University (New York: Routledge, 1992)
- The World Turned: Essays on Gay History, Politics, and Culture (Durham: Duke University Press, 2002)
- Lost Prophet: The Life and Times of Bayard Rustin (New York: Free Press, 2003; University of Chicago Press, 2004)
- Queer Legacies Stories from Chicago's LGBTQ Archives (University of Chicago Press, 2020)
- Memories of a Gay Catholic Boyhood: Coming of Age in the Sixties (Durham: Duke University Press, 2022)
- Making Gay History: Memoir of a Scholar-Activist (Durham: Duke University Press, 2026)

=== Co-author ===
- With Estelle Freedman, Intimate Matters: A History of Sexuality in America (New York: Harper and Row, 1988; 2nd expanded edition, University of Chicago Press, 1997; 3rd edition, University of Chicago Press, 2012)

=== Editor ===
- The Civil Rights Struggle: Leaders in Profile (New York: Facts-on-File, 1979)
- The Universities and the Gay Experience: Proceedings of the Conference Sponsored by the Women and Men of the Gay Academic Union, November 23 and 24, 1973 (New York: Gay Academic Union, 1974)

=== Co-editor ===
- With William Turner and Urvashi Vaid, Creating Change: Sexuality, Public Policy and Civil Rights (New York: St. Martin's Press, 2000)
