= Pearl M. Hart =

American defense attorney (1890–1975)

- Pearl M. Hart
- Born: Pearl Minnie Harchovsky; April 7, 1890; Traverse City, Michigan
- Died: March 22, 1975 (aged 84); Chicago, Illinois, United States of America
- Occupation: Attorney
- Political party: Progressive Party
- Partner: Valerie Taylor (1963–1975)

Pearl Minnie Hart (born Harchovsky; April 7, 1890 – March 22, 1975) was a Chicago attorney who defended oppressed minority groups. Hart was the first woman in Chicago to be appointed Public Defender in the Morals Court. She represented children, women, immigrants, lesbians, and gay men, often without fee or for a nominal fee. She attended the John Marshall Law School and was admitted to the Illinois State Bar in 1914.

== Biography ==
Pearl's family moved to Chicago in 1892 when her father, Rabbi David Harchovsky, accepted a rabbinical position supervising the kosher slaughtering of animals for a congregation on the southwest side.

She was admitted to the bar in 1914 and became one of the first female attorneys in Chicago to specialize in criminal law. She began her career as an adult probation officer in Municipal Court in 1915 and continued in that position until 1917.

In the 1950s, Hart focused on defending immigrants in deportation proceedings. In U.S. v. Witkovish, which she took to the United States Supreme Court, the high court agreed with her contention that the Attorney General's power to question aliens subject to deportation was limited by constitutional safeguards. She stated, "...I defend the foreign born against the present deportation hysteria because of a consciousness that it was the foreign born and their children who built this nation of ours and who have been its most loyal partisans".

Hart was at one point the only woman in Chicago practicing criminal law. She was President of the Chicago Lawyer's Guild and held a professorship at the John Marshall Law School.

She ran for Superior Court Judge in Cook County in 1947 for the Progressive Party, which was a new political party at the time. She ranked third among the Progressive candidates, a number that was credited to the large number of women voters at the polls that year.

In April 1981, to honor Hart and 1920's Chicago activist Henry Gerber, "The Midwest Gay and Lesbian Archive and Library" changed its name to "The Henry Gerber–Pearl M. Hart Library: The Midwest Lesbian & Gay Resource Center."

Called the "Guardian Angel of Chicago's Gay Community" for her diligent fight against police harassment, Hart was inducted posthumously into the Chicago Gay and Lesbian Hall of Fame in 1992.
