= Windy City Times =

LGBT newspaper in Chicago, Illinois

- Cover of the February 6, 2013 issue
- Type: Weekly newspaper
- Owner: Windy City Media Group
- Founder(s): Drew Badanish; Tracy Baim; Bob Bearden; Jeff McCourt
- Publisher: Terri Klinsky
- Editor-in-chief: Andrew Davis (executive editor)
- Editor: Tracy Baim
- Managing editor: Matt Simonette
- Staff writers: Jonathan Abarbanel; Richard Knight Jr. Bob Roehr; Rex Wockner; Yvonne Zipter
- Founded: 1985
- Language: English
- Headquarters: 5315 N. Clark St. #192, Chicago, Illinois
- City: Chicago, IL
- Sister newspapers: Nightspots
- ISSN: 1049-698X
- OCLC number: 20341561
- Website: windycitytimes.com

Windy City Times is an LGBT newspaper in Chicago that published its first issue on September 26, 1985.

== History ==
Windy City Times was founded in 1985 by Jeff McCourt, Bob Bearden, Drew Badanish and Tracy Baim, who started Sentury Publications to publish the paper. In 1987, Baim left Sentury Publications to found a new newspaper called Outlines. WCT and Outlines were the two primary LGBT newspapers in the region for more than 12 years. In 2000, Baim purchased Windy City Times from McCourt, and merged the two publications.

In 2007, McCourt died. In 2018, Baim became publisher of the Chicago Reader and remains as owner of Windy City Media Group.

In 2017, journalist Gretchen Rachel Hammond was removed from her job after she published a story about three LGBT women who were expelled from a Gay Pride march for carrying a rainbow flag featuring a Jewish Star. Shortly after, she was hired as a reporter for Tablet.

Windy City Media Group announced on September 9, 2020 that, as of September 30, the biweekly print version would cease. News and feature coverage continue digitally at www.windycitymediagroup.com.

== Awards ==
Windy City Times is a member of the National Gay Newspaper Guild, and has received numerous honors for its work, both from journalism organizations and from the LGBT community. Awards include from the National Lesbian and Gay Journalists Association, the Peter Lisagor Awards, and the Studs Terkel Award for Baim. Among groups honoring WCMG and Baim are Chicago Gay and Lesbian Hall of Fame; ACLU of Illinois; Human Rights Campaign; NOW; March on Washington Chicago Committee; Dignity/Chicago; Affinity; Greater Chicago Committee; and Association of Latin Men in Action.

In 2021, the newspaper won the Barbara Gittings Award for Excellence in LGBTQ Media at the 32nd GLAAD Media Awards.
