= Gerber/Hart Library and Archives =

Private research library in Chicago, IL, US

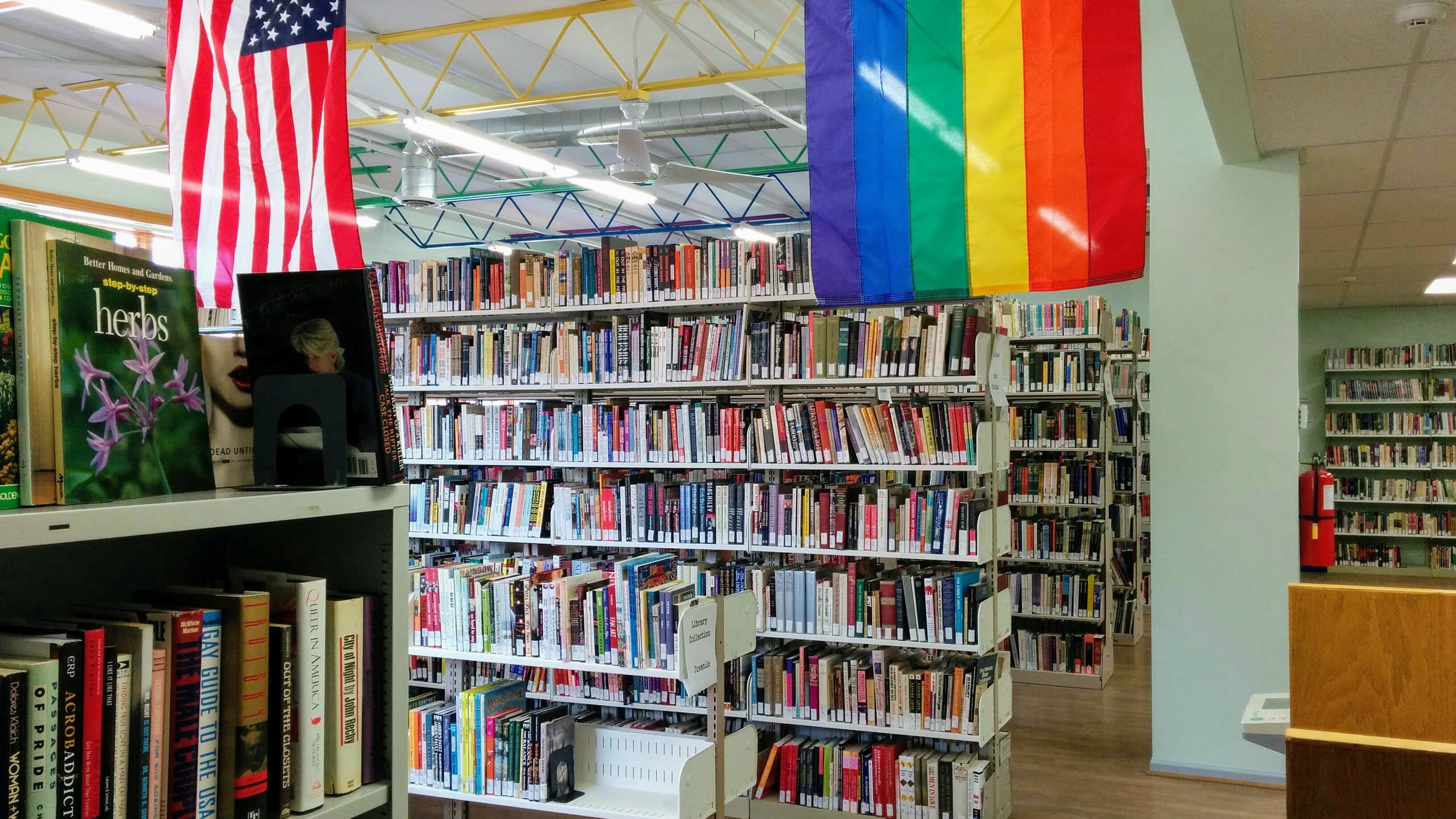
- Gerber/Hart Library stacks
- 41.999970°N 87.671641°W
- Location: Rogers Park, Chicago, United States, United States
- Scope: LGBTQ materials
- Established: 1981; 45 years ago

Other information
- Director: Erin Bell
- Website: www.gerberhart.org

The Gerber/Hart Library and Archives (or "The Henry Gerber–Pearl M. Hart Library: The Midwest Lesbian & Gay Resource Center"), founded in 1981, is the largest circulating library of gay and lesbian titles in the Midwestern United States. Located in Chicago's Rogers Park neighborhood, it houses over 14,000 volumes, 800 periodical titles, and 100 items in the archival collection. The Gerber/Hart Library and Archives were inducted into the Chicago Gay and Lesbian Hall of Fame in 1996.

Although a private non-profit, the library has received public funding for its continuing operation from Illinois' "Fund for the Future," including a $25,000 grant in 1999.

== Location ==
Gerber/Hart was originally located in the offices of Gay Horizons (now known as the Center on Halsted). In 2012, the library moved into its current location in Rogers Park, a neighborhood in northern Chicago, IL. It is housed in the Howard Brown Health building on Clark Street, where the organization rents several rooms on the second floor.

Alongside a reading room and free circulating library, Gerber/Hart also has a physical exhibition space, which rotates throughout the year.

Author Rebecca Makkai utilized the Gerber/Hart archives as part of her research for the novel, The Great Believers.
