= Chicago LGBT Hall of Fame =

City-sponsored hall of fame (founded 1991)

Coordinates: 41.9494°N 87.6491°W

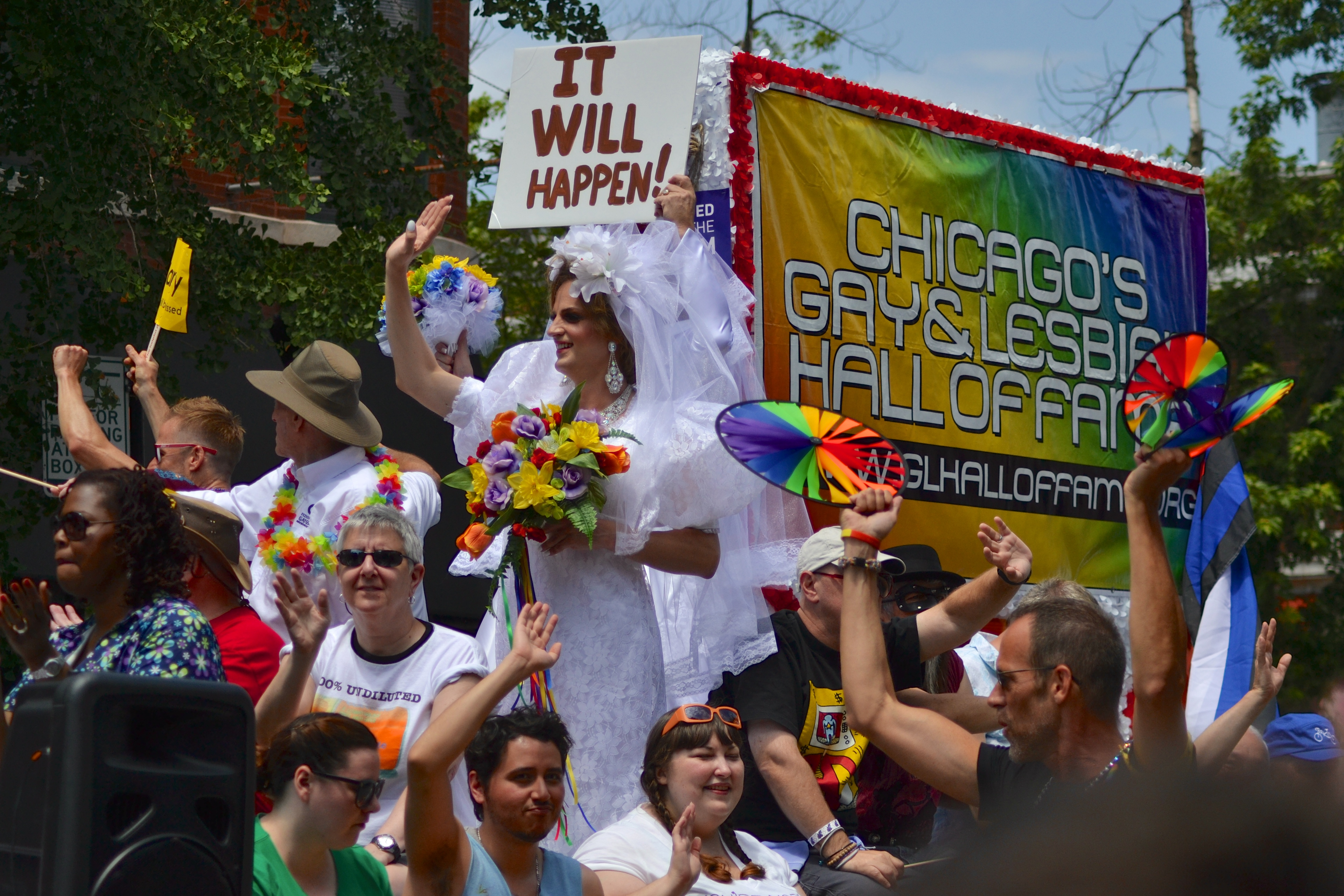
- Chicago Gay and Lesbian Hall of Fame Pride float in Pride 2013.
- Formation: June 1991; 35 years ago
- Founded at: Chicago
- Type: Nonprofit
- Tax ID no.: 32-0298393
- Purpose: Honor LGBT persons in Chicago
- Location: Chicago, Illinois, United States
- Board of directors: Gary Liss; Kathy Caldwell; Tarrina Dikes; Gary Chichester; Greg McFall; Kevin Bryson; Pat McCombs
- Website: chicagolgbthalloffame.org
- Formerly called: Chicago Gay and Lesbian Hall of Fame

The Chicago LGBT Hall of Fame (formerly Chicago Gay and Lesbian Hall of Fame) is an institution founded in 1991 to honor persons and entities who have made significant contributions to the quality of life or well-being of the LGBT community in Chicago. It is the first city-sponsored hall of fame dedicated to LGBT people, organizations and community in the United States.

== About ==
The Chicago Gay and Lesbian Hall of Fame was created in June 1991. The hall of fame is the first "municipal institution of its kind in the United States, and possibly in the world." The first ceremony took place during Pride Week and was held at Chicago City Hall. Mayor Richard M. Daley hosted the ceremony and afterwards, photos of the inductees were displayed in city hall. Clarence Wood, of the Chicago Commission on Human Relations did not want to continue city sponsorship of the hall of fame after its first year, but the city decided to remain a sponsor.

It currently has no physical facility but maintains a website, which allows anyone to visit the Hall of Fame at any time. In 2016, the name of the Hall of Fame was changed to the Chicago LGBT Hall of Fame.

== Inductees ==
Inductees of the Hall of Fame can be any individuals or organizations who have contributed to the LGBTQ community in Chicago. Mayor Richard M. Daley said that the Chicago Gay and Lesbian Hall of Fame "honors individuals and organizations within the LGBT communities who have demonstrated a commitment to diversity and work to enrich and unify our city."

LGBT Hall of Fame
Name	Birth–Death	Inductee year	Area of achievement
Ortez Alderson	(1952–1990)	1991	Actor and activist.
Jon-Henri Damski	(1937–1997)	1991	Columnist and Chicago journalist.
James W. Flint		1991	Founder and owner of Miss Gay Continental Pageant.
Gay Chicago Magazine		1991	LGBT news.
Renee C. Hanover	(1926–2011)	1991	LGBT attorney.
Howard Brown Health Center		1991	Health center serving LGBT community.
Judith S. Johns		1991	Friend of the community.
Carol A. Johnson		1991	Midwest AIDS Project coordinator.
William B. Kelley	(1942–2016)	1991	LGBT activist and board member.
Marie J. Kuda	(1940–2016)	1991	Historian and archivist who worked to preserve LGBT culture.
Chuck Renslow	(1929–2017)	1991	Cofounded Gold Coast, one of the first gay leather bars in the world.
Adrienne J. Smith	(1934–1992)	1991	One of the first out lesbian psychologists.
Maxxon "Max" C. Smith		1991	Gay rights activist.
Richard B. Turner		1991	Co-founder of Funders Concerned About AIDS.
Gary Chichester		1992	30 years of commitment to LGBT community.
Ann Christophersen		1992	Businesswoman.
Thom Dombkowski	(1950–2006)	1992	Fund-raiser and executive director of Chicago House and Social Service Agency.
Henry Gerber	(1892–1972)	1992	Founded Chicago's Society for Human Rights.
Richard Lee Gray		1992	Helping African American LGBT people.
Vernita Gray	(1948–2014)	1992	LGBT hotline, support groups.
Peg Grey	(1945–2007)	1992	LGBT athletics.
Pearl M. Hart	(1890–1975)	1992	Lawyer defending LGBT civil rights.
Horizons Community Services		1992	LGBT social service agency.
Harley McMillen	(1943-2013)	1992	Helped form health clinics and the AIDS Action Project.
Scott McPherson	(1959–1992)	1992	One of the first openly gay artists.
Metropolitan Sports Association		1992	Organized athletic activities in Chicago.
Dom Orejudos	(1933–1991)	1992	Dancer, choreographer, and artist (commonly known by his pseudonym, Etienne).
Mary D. Powers	(1922– 2016)	1992	Friend of the community.
Daniel Sotomayor	(1958–1992)	1992	Openly gay cartoonist and AIDS activist.
Valerie Taylor	(1913–1997)	1992	LGBT advocate.
Proud Black Lesbians and Gays		1993	Committee formed to promote a positive image of LGBT African Americans.
Robert Sloane Basker	(1918– 2001)	1993	Founded Mattachine Midwest.
E. Kitch Childs	(1937–1993)	1993	Psychologist and LGBT rights advocate.
Jerrold Cohen		1993	Community group organizer.
Robert T. Ford		1993	Worked on LGBT outreach to the African American community.
Richard Garrin		1993	Founding director of Windy City Gay Chorus.
Jeff Graubart-Cervone		1993	LGBT activist.
Joel Hall		1993	Choreographer.
Nancy Lanoue		1993	Fought to stop violence against women.
Sid L. Mohn		1993	First openly-gay person to be ordained in the Illinois Conference of the United Church of Christ.
Mountain Moving Coffeehouse for Womyn and Children		1993	Oldest continuously running, women-only space in the nation, a lesbian-run non-profit social alternative to bars.
Kathy Osterman	(1943–1992)	1993	Friend of the community.
Richard W. Pfeiffer	(1949–2019)	1993	Activist and volunteer.
Linda S. Rodgers		1993	Businesswoman, fund-raiser and activist.
Ron Sable		1993	Co-founded HIV/AIDS clinic. Openly gay physician.
Bruce C. Scott		1993	Fought anti-gay employment discrimination.
Marge Summit	(1935– 2023)	1993	Businesswoman.
Joanne E. Trapani	(1949–2020)	1993	Political activist.
Al Wardell		1993	LGBT Community leader.
Robert J. Adams		1994	Leader of the Chicago chapter of NAMES.
Tracy Baim	(1963-)	1994	Journalist and photographer.
George S. Buse		1994	LGBT activist, actor and minister.
James A. Bussen		1994	Local and state gay rights lobbyist and fundraiser; longtime leader of Dignity/Chicago
Lori Cannon		1994	Friend of the community.
John Chester		1994	LGBT leader.
Chicago House and Social Service Agency		1994	Agency that provides care and housing for people with HIV and AIDS in Chicago.
Samuel F. Davis, Jr.		1994	Entrepreneur and attorney.
Adrienne J. Goodman		1994	Friend of the community.
Earnest E. Hite, Jr.		1994	Co-founder of Image Plus.
Bruce Koff		1994	LGBT social services advocate.
Ellis B. Levin	(1945– )	1994	Friend of the community.
Lionheart Gay Theatre Company		1994	Theater performing LGBT works.
Open Hand Chicago		1994	In-home meal program for persons living with AIDS.
Gregory A. Sprague		1994	LGBT researcher.
Elizabeth E. Tocci		1994	Gay bar owner.
Steven F. Wakefield		1994	LGBT leader.
Caryn Berman	(-2014)	1995	Therapist and social worker.
Samson Chan		1995	LGBT activist.
T. Chris Cothran		1995	Activist involved in the Pride parades in Chicago.
Sarah Craig		1995	LGBT journalist.
Frontrunners Frontwalkers Chicago		1995	Running club for LGBT people.
Jean V. Hardisty	(1945–2015)	1995	Helped open the first shelter for women who were victims of domestic violence.
Nick Kelly		1995	LGBT activist.
Dawn Clark Netsch	(1926–2013)	1995	Friend of the community.
José Pena		1995	Video artist.
Queer Nation Chicago		1995	Direct-action organization supporting LGBT individuals.
David B. Sindt		1995	LGBT activist in religious communities.
Armando L. Smith		1995	Community leader.
James Monroe Smith	(1957–2003)	1995	Founded AIDS Legal Council.
Thomas M. Tunney	1955-	1995	Restaurant owner, activist, and White Crane Wellness Center board member.
Yvonne Zipter		1995	Columnist documenting LGBT lives.
Jacqueline Anderson		1996	LGBT educator and writer.
Bailiwick Repertory's Pride Series		1996	Pride series in theater starting in the 1980s.
Jack Delaney		1996	LGBT supporter and leader.
Gerber/Hart Library and Archives		1996	Largest LGBT archives in the Midwest.
Arlene Halko	(1933–2007)	1996	Physicist, AIDS and LGBT activist.
Greg Harris	(1955– )	1996	Openly gay politician.
Frankie Knuckles	(1955–2014)	1996	Inventor of Chicago House music.
Tony Midnite	(1926–2009)	1996	Early drag performer and costume designer.
Mary Morten		1996	Documented African American lesbian experiences, LGBT leader.
Ifti Nasim	(1946–2011)	1996	Pakistani LGBT poet.
Charlotte Newfeld	(1930–2022)	1996	LGBT rights activist, friend of the community.
Norm Sloan		1996	LGBT activist.
Tiffani St. Cloud		1996	Student LGBT organizer.
Toni Armstrong, Jr.		1997	LGBT educator and musician.
Miguel Ayala		1997	Student LGBT activist.
Roger Chaffin		1997	LGBT businessman.
James C. Darby		1997	Co-founder of Veterans for Equal Rights.
Dignity/Chicago		1997	Local chapter for LGBT Roman Catholics.
Ida Greathouse		1997	AIDS activist.
John Hammell		1997	Lawyer working on behalf of LGBT people and people living with HIV/AIDS.
Rick Karlin		1997	LGBT community activist.
Corinne J. Kawecki		1997	LGBT volunteer.
Larry McKeon	(1944–2008)	1997	First openly gay Illinois state senator.
David G. Ostrow		1997	Leader in gay men's health.
Mary Ann Smith		1997	Friend of the community.
Carrie Barnett		1998	Co-founder of People Like Us Books.
Thomas R. Chiola	(1952– )	1998	First openly gay person elected to public office in Illinois.
Laurie J. Dittman		1998	Political and LGBT community organizer.
Jeannette Howard Foster	(1895–1991)	1998	Writer, educator, librarian, author of first critical study of lesbian literature.
Jorjet Harper		1998	Writer on LGBT issues.
Arthur L. Johnston		1998	Community activist.
Ira H. Jones		1998	Spokesperson for LGBT rights.
Clifford P. Kelley		1998	Friend of the community.
Dorothy Klefstad		1998	Friend of the community.
LesBiGay Radio		1998	Chicago broadcast serving the LGBT audience.
Renae Ogletree	(1950–2010)	1998	LGBT and health care activist.
Dean Robert Ogren		1998	LGBT volunteer.
Victor A. Salvo, Jr.		1998	LGBT activist.
Modesto "Tico" Valle		1998	LGBT activist.
Luule Vess		1998	Founder of Chicago's Project VIDA.
Ava Allen		1999	Owner of Chicago's oldest Lesbian bar, Lost & Found.
John J. Balester		1999	Leader in the Illinois Gay and Lesbian Task Force and chair of Chicago's Advisory Council on Gay and Lesbian Issues.
David Brian Bell		1999	Advocate for people with HIV/AIDS.
Randy Duncan		1999	Choreographer who uses LGBT themes in his work.
Rick Garcia	(1956–2026	1999	LGBT activist.
Lorraine Hansberry	(1930–1965)	1999	Playwright and supporter of LGBT rights.
Derrick Allen Hicks	(1955–2002)	1999	Community organizer.
Billie Jean King	(1943– )	1999	Friend of the community.
Lesbian Community Cancer Project		1999	First program to provide services for LGBT women with cancer and their families.
Adrene Perom	(1935–2000)	1999	Friend of the community.
Norman L. Sandfield		1999	Community organizer in LGBT and Jewish communities.
Gregg Shapiro		1999	Literary and music critic who brought awareness to LGBT community.
Jesse White	(1934– )	1999	Friend of the community.
Phil Wilson	(1956– )	1999	Advocate for people living with HIV/AIDS.
ACT UP/Chicago		2000	Local chapter of ACT UP.
Association of Latin Men for Action		2000	Group supporting LGBT Latinos.
Lorrainne Sade Baskerville		2000	Founder of transGenesis.
Henry Blake Fuller	(1857–1929)	2000	Writer who incorporated gay characters in his work.
Chicago chapter of GLSEN		2000	Organization helping students and staff in schools.
Phil A. Hannema		2000	Volunteer in LGBT organizations.
Sarah Lucia Hoagland	(1945– )	2000	Professor and writer.
Nancy J. Katz		2000	First openly lesbian judge in Illinois.
Danny Kopelson		2000	LGBT fundraiser.
Patricia S. McCombs		2000	LGBT and African American organizer.
Helen Shiller	(1947– )	2000	Friend of the community.
Rene Van Hulle	(1953–2007)	2000	Community organizer.
Israel Wright		2000	LGBT community leader.
Lora Branch		2001	Health professional involved with HIV/AIDS prevention.
Robert Castillo		2001	LGBT organizer.
Chicago Gay Men's Chorus		2001	Choral group active since 1983.
Keith Elliot		2001	Dancer and choreographer raising money for HIV/AIDS.
Sara Feigenholtz	(1956– )	2001	Friend of the community.
Frank Goley	(1943–1994)	2001	With his partner, Robert Maddox, he was an openly gay businessman and owner of Male Hide Leathers store.
Robert Maddox	(1935–2009)	2001	With his partner, Frank Goley, he was an openly gay businessman and owner of Male Hide Leathers store.
Chuck Hyde		2001	Businessman and fundraiser.
Antonio David Jimenez		2001	HIV/AIDS educator.
Michael A. Leppen		2001	Philanthropist and fundraiser.
Ellen A. Meyers		2001	LGBT political organizer.
Kathryn Munzer		2001	Helped foster lesbian culture.
Studs Terkel	(1912–2008)	2001	Friend of the community.
Affinity Community Services		2002	Organization serving black LGBT women.
Evette Cardona		2002	LGBT organizer.
C.C. Carter		2002	Writer, poet and performer.
James "Little Jim" Gates		2002	Community leader and owner of gay bar, Little Jim's.
Louis I. Lang		2002	Friend of the community.
Mattachine Midwest		2002	First gay rights organization in Chicago.
NAMES Project, Chicago chapter		2002	NAMES is an AIDS Quilt custodian.
Charles Edward Nelson II		2002	HIV/AIDS activist.
Mona Noriega		2002	LGBT activist.
Christina Smith		2002	LGBT activist.
Lauren Sugerman		2002	Out lesbian helping women involved in construction and manufacturing trades.
Angel Abcede		2003	Dancer, writer and LGBT and HIV/AIDS activist.
About Face Theatre		2003	LGBT Theater in Chicago.
AIDS Legal Council of Chicago		2003	Organization providing funds and free legal assistance to people affected by HIV.
Buddies' Restaurant and Bar		2003	Neighborhood and community business.
Tania Callaway	(1952–2000)	2003	Chef and community organizer.
Armand R. Cerbone		2003	Worked to help LGBT people through psychology and therapy. Wrote official guidelines for psychotherapy with LGBT clients.
Chicago Black Lesbians and Gays		2003	Coalition of activist groups for both people of color and LGBT people.
R. Sue Connolly		2003	Helped LGBT charities.
Bon Foster	(1955–1991)	2003	Lawyer and LGBT activist.
The Graham Family		2003	Friend of the community.
Tonda L. Hughes		2003	Health professional aiding lesbians.
Patricia M. Logue		2003	Opened a Lambda Legal Defense and Education Fund office in Chicago.
John Pennycuff		2003	LGBT activist.
Laurence E. Spang		2003	Created dental clinic for low-income people with HIV positive status.
Sheron Denise Webb		2003	DJ playing music for many occasions.
Albert N. Williams		2003	Journalist, writer and award-winning editor of GayLife and Windy City Times.
Roger Brown	(1941–1997)	2004	Painter and muralist.
Christopher Clason	(1953–1991)	2004	Created Test Positive Aware Network.
Charles E. Clifton	( –2004)	2004	HIV/AIDS activist.
Frank Galati	(1943– 2023 )	2004	Actor and professor emeritus at Northwest University.
Ralph Paul Gernhardt	(1934–2006)	2004	Writer and activist.
Suzanne Marie Kraus		2004	LGBT activist.
Lincoln Park Lagooners		2004	Social group that has raised money to fight HIV/AIDS and homophobia.
Mulryan and York		2004	Law firm of Mary M. York and Rosemary Mulryan.
PFLAG Chicago		2004	Friend of the community.
Julio Rodriguez		2004	Advocate for Latinx LGBT people.
Nan Schaffer		2004	Veterinarian and philanthropist.
Terri Worman		2004	LGBT community organizer.
Alexandra Billings	(1962- )	2005	Transgender actor.
Megan Carney		2005	Working with LGBT youth.
Aldo Castillo		2005	LGBT activist.
John D'Emilio	(1948– )	2005	LGBT historian.
Equality Illinois		2005	Organization fighting against inequality in Illinois.
Mary "Merry Mary" Featherson		2005	Friend of the community.
Mike McHale		2005	LGBT activist and lawyer.
Jim Pickett		2005	Writer and LGBT activist.
Juan Reed		2005	Helped create an LGBT friendly church at St. Martin's Episcopal Church.
Carol Ronen	(1945-)	2005	Friend of the community.
C. Michael Savage	(1952–2004)	2005	Social service advocate.
Catherine Sikora		2005	Photographer and LGBT activist.
Lawrence E. Sloan	(1959–1995)	2005	Director, playwright and producer who helped raise money to fight HIV/AIDS.
Test Positive Aware Network		2005	Organization to help those who are HIV positive to have a community.
Margaret C. Anderson	(1886–1973)	2006	Literary couple made up of Margaret Anderson and Jane Heap.
Jane Heap	(1883–1964)	2006	Literary couple made up of Margaret Anderson and Jane Heap.
Congregation Or Chadash		2006	LGBT friendly Jewish synagogue.
Jacques Cristion	( –2003)	2006	Drag performer.
Richard M. Daley	(1942– )	2006	LGBT friendly mayor of Chicago.
Marigold Bowl		2006	Meeting play for LGBT people in Chicago.
Jill M. Metz		2006	Lawyer and LGBT advocate.
Charles R. Middleton	(1944-)	2006	First openly gay man to be a major U.S. university president.
Edward Negron		2006	LGBT Latinx community advocate.
Laird Petersen	( –2010)	2006	LGBT volunteer.
Sidetrack		2006	Organization that allows activists to host events, donates goods and services.
Star Gaze		2006	Bar that has been supportive of the LGBT community.
Richard M. Uyvari		2006	Leader in LGBT sports in Chicago.
American Veterans for Equal Rights		2007	Group serving and supporting LGBT veterans.
David Blatt		2007	David Blatt and David Moore are physicians who have helped LGBT and HIV/AIDS communities.
David Moore		2007	David Blatt and David Moore are physicians who have helped LGBT and HIV/AIDS communities.
Carol Moseley Braun	(1947– )	2007	Friend of the community.
Robbin Burr		2007	Helped start domestic partner benefits at American Airlines.
Gay Games VII		2007	The Gay Games were held in Chicago in 2006.
Tarrina Dikes		2007	LGBT volunteer.
Martin Gapshis	(1946–2010)	2007	LGBT community leader.
Jeffrey E. McCourt	(1955–2007)	2007	Founding publisher of Windy City Times.
Carlos T. Mock	(1956-)	2007	LGBT activist.
Chilli Pepper		2007	Drag performer.
A Real Read		2007	African American LGBT ensemble performing from 1996 to 2001.
Karen C. Sendziak		2007	Gerber/Hart librarian.
Patrick Sheahan		2007	LGBT community activist.
Harold Washington	(1922–1987)	2007	Friend of the community.
Vera Washington		2007	LGBT community activist.
Jane Addams	(1860–1935)	2008	Community activist and Chicago icon.
Suzanne Arnold		2008	LGBT sports community leader.
Artemis Singers		2008	First lesbian chorus in the US.
Kevin G. Boyer		2008	Former president of the Gerber/Hart Library.
Sam Coady		2008	Leader in the LGBT sports community.
Gregory R. Dell		2008	Friend of the community.
Katherine (Kit) Duffy	(1944– 2015	2008	Friend of the community.
Eddie Dugan	(1944–1987)	2008	Early supporter of Gay Chicago Magazine, owner of Dugan's Bistro.
Murray Edelman		2008	Founder of Chicago Gay Liberation.
Stephen (Wanda Lust) Jones	( –1978)	2008	Drag entertainer and health advocate.
Joe La Pat	(1943–2008)	2008	Supporter of LGBT organizations in Chicago.
Jesus Salgueiro		2008	Artist and co-founder of Common Threads.
Art Smith	(1960– )	2008	Chef and co-founder of Common Threads.
Guy Warner		2008	LGBT organization leader.
AIDS Foundation of Chicago		2009	Organization that helps people with HIV/AIDS.
Paula Basta		2009	Helps support aging LGBT people.
Lou Conte		2009	Founder of Hubbard Street Dance Chicago.
Lori A. Cooper		2009	Promoting liaisons between the Chicago police and the LGBT community.
Marcia J. Lipetz	(1947–2018)	2009	Leader in non-profit organizations in Chicago.
Amy Maggio		2009	Leader in LGBT organizations.
Joey McDonald		2009	Volunteer in LGBT organizations.
Mike Quigley	(1958–)	2009	Friend of the community.
Frank M. Robinson	(1926–2014)	2009	Journalist, activist and writer.
Jane M. Hussein Saks		2009	Leader in LGBT social activism.
Zaida Sanabia		2009	Founder of Amiguitas and student LGBT activist.
Patrick Sinozich		2009	Leader in LGBT musical institutions.
Marilyn Urso		2009	Friend of the community.
Jorge Valdivia		2009	Artist and founder of Homofrecuencia.
Claudia Allen	(1954– )	2010	Playwright focusing on LGBT people.
American Civil Liberties Union of Chicago		2010	Fighting for the civil rights of LGBT people.
Asians & Friends of Chicago		2010	Organization for gay men of Asian descent to network and raise money for various causes.
Chicago History Museum		2010	Documenting LGBT history in Chicago.
Dan Di Leo	(1938–1989)	2010	Journalist and businessman who co-founded Gay Chicago Magazine.
Scott Free		2010	LGBT community activist and musician.
Bob Gammie		2010	Organizer and fund raiser in LGBT communities.
International Mr. Leather		2010	One of the oldest LGBT institutions in both Chicago and the US.
E. Patrick Johnson	(1967-)	2010	Writer who has focused on LGBT communities.
David Ernesto Munar		2010	LGBT community leader in the Latinx community.
Achy Obejas	(1956– )	2010	Writer and political activist.
Paul G. Oostenbrug		2010	Volunteer in LGBT communities.
Jose R. Rios		2010	Liaison between LGBT communities and Chicago police.
Stan Sloan		2010	CEO of Chicago House and chaplain at St. Gregory's Episcopal School.
Mark E. Wojcik		2010	Professor and mentor to LGBT people in the John Marshall Law School.
Paul Adams		2011	Co-founder of Chicago for AIDS Rights.
Greg Cameron		2011	Cultural arts leader who has focused on LGBT issues.
Antonia "Tata" Flores	(1958–2008)	2011	One of the creators of Dykes on Bikes in Chicago.
Grant Lynn Ford		2011	Co-founder of GayLife in Chicago.
Robert Garofalo		2011	Physician who has helped LGBT people in Chicago.
Good Shepherd Parish Metropolitan Community Church		2011	The first church for LGBT people in the Midwest.
Ted Grady		2011	Helped underwrite events for nonprofits.
Marcia Hill		2011	Leader in the Chicago Metropolitan Sports Association.
Tony Jackson	(1882–1921)	2011	Openly gay Chicago musician.
Jenner & Block		2011	Law firm advocating for LGBT communities.
Owen Keehnen		2011	Writer and historian documenting the LGBT community.
Lakeside Pride Music Ensembles		2011	LGBT instrumental ensembles.
The Night Ministry		2011	Organization reaching out to youth on the streets.
Brett Shingledecker	(1962–)	2011	Co-founder of People Like Us Bookstore.
Lois L. Bates	(1970–2011)	2012	LGBT activist and minister.
Chi-Town Squares		2012	Openly gay square-dancing club.
Chicago Black Gay Men's Caucus		2012	Part of the city of Chicago's public health department.
St. Sukie de la Croix	(1951-)	2012	Collector of LGBT history in Chicago.
Stanford E. Gaylord		2012	Activist and writer in the LGBT community.
William W. Greaves		2012	Early authority on HIV, advocate for the LGBT community.
Kieth R. Green		2012	Social worker helping to prevent the spread of HIV.
Mark Ishaug		2012	Local and national leader in the LGBT community.
David Orr	(1944– )	2012	Friend of the community.
Proud to Run Chicago		2012	Running group that raises money for LGBT causes.
Bill Pry		2012	Advocate for LGBT youth.
Heather C. Sawyer		2012	Lawyer serving the LGBT community.
Laura S. Washington		2012	Journalist who writes about LGBT and minority communities.
Honey West		2012	Transgender singer and comedian.
Gaylon Alcaraz	(1966– )	2013	Activist and human-rights advocate.
James L. Alexander		2013	Philanthropist in the LGBT community.
James L. Bennett		2013	LGBT religious community leader.
Jorge Cestou		2013	Immigrant and LGBT community advocate.
Rocco J. Claps		2013	First openly gay cabinet member in Illinois.
Rudolph Johnson, Jr.	(1947–2006)	2013	LGBT community leader.
Lambda Legal (Midwest Regional Office)		2013	Supporting LGBT people with legal representation in the Midwest.
Lee A. Newell II		2013	LGBT community leader and activist.
Paté		2013	Performer and activist in LGBT communities and AIDS groups.
Andrew Patner	(1959–2015)	2013	LGBT writer and journalist.
POW-WOW		2013	Performers of Writers for Women on Women's Issues.
Laura Ricketts	(1967– )	2013	Philanthropist for the LGBT community in Chicago.
Neil Steinberg	(1960– )	2013	Friend of the community.
Burr Tillstrom	(1917–1985)	2013	Puppeteer.
Brenda Webb		2013	Friend of the community.
David Zak		2013	Running LGBT theater in Chicago.
Gerald Arpino	(1923–2008)	2014	co-founder of Joffrey Ballet.
Jennifer Brier		2014	Historian of LGBT communities and people with AIDS.
Kelly Cassidy		2014	Political activist for LGBT rights.
Terry Cosgrove		2014	LGBT advocate.
Christina Kahrl		2014	First openly transgender sports writer in the US.
Edward Mogul		2014	Lawyer and LGBT advocate.
Out & Proud in Chicago		2014	Documentary about the history of Chicago's LGBT communities.
Lisa Marie Pickens		2014	LGBT activist.
Debra Shore		2014	Openly lesbian commissioner and political organizer.
Silk Road Rising		2014	Chicago theater project.
Ross A. Slotten		2014	Physician working to fight AIDS.
Heather A. Steans	(1963-)	2014	Friend of the community.
Lucretia Clay-Ward		2014	Friend of the community.
Bennet Williams		2014	Journalist, author and activist.
Clarence N. Wood		2014	Friend of the community.
Jean Albright		2015	LGBT community leader.
Fred Eychaner	(1944– )	2015	Philanthropist in the LGBT community.
Emmanuel Garcia		2015	LGBT journalist and youth mentor.
Stanley Jencyzk		2015	Volunteer in the LGBT community.
Lesbian and Gay Police Association		2015	Organization formed to support LGBT police officers in Chicago.
Gay Officers Action League		2015	Organization formed to support LGBT police officers in Chicago.
Phoenix Matthews		2015	Leader in the LGBT community.
Gail Morse		2015	Advocate for the civil rights of LGBT people.
Michael O'Connor		2015	Leader in the LGBT community.
Jan Schakowsky	(1944– )	2015	Friend of the community.
Barbara Smith	(1946–2015)	2015	LGBT activist.
Camilla B. Taylor		2015	Lawyer working for the LGBT community.
Lauren Verdich		2015	LGBT activist.
Yvonne Welbon	(1967-)	2016	Filmmaker who highlights African American LGBT perspectives.
Maritxa Vidal		2016	President of Chicago chapter of TransLatin@Coalition.
Norma Seledon		2016	LGBT and Latina activist.
Patrick Quinn	(1948– )	2016	Friend of the community.
Thomas Klein	(c. 1951- )	2016	Openly gay physician.
John Marshall Law School		2016	Friend of the community.
Kim L. Hunt		2016	Executive director of the Pride Action Network.
Patrick Dennis	(1921–1976)	2016	Author.
David Lee Csicsko		2016	Graphic artist.
David Cerda	(1961– )	2016	Co-founder of Hell in a Handbag Productions.
Román Buenrostro		2016	Co-founder of the Association for Latin Men for Action (ALMA).
Ronald E. Bogan		2016	First man serving on active duty in the Chicago Police Department to come out as gay.
Big Chicks		2016	Diverse LGBTQ bar.
Tom Bachtell	(1957-)	2016	Artist and illustrator.
Amigas Latinas		2016	Organization helping LGBTQ Latinas.
Robert Henry Allerton	(1873–1964)	2016	Gay philanthropist.
Keith Butler		2017	Starred as Kevin in Kevin's Room.
Kathy Caldwell		2017	LGBT activist and Chicago police officer.
Ketty Teanga	(1947–2011)	2017	Latina performer also known as "Miss Ketty".
Greer Lankton	(1958–1996)	2017	Transgender artist.
Mark Nagel		2017	LGBT publisher.
Glen Pietrandoni	(1956- )	2017	Pharmacist and HIV/AIDS treatment advocate.
Dulce Quintero		2017	Community activist.
Timothy Stewart-Winter		2017	Historian and author.
Alicia T. Vega		2017	LGBT activist.
Lavender Woman		2017	One of the earliest lesbian publications in the US.
Leather Archives and Museum		2017	A "community archives, library, and museum of Leather, kink, fetish, and BDSM history and culture."
People Like Us Bookstore		2017	Exclusively gay bookstore in Chicago.
Alphawood Foundation		2017	Friend of the community.
Ralla Klepak		2017	Lawyer representing the LGBT community.
Jay Paul Deratany		2020	Human rights lawyer, LGBT advocate, filmmaker, and playwright.
Denise Foy		2020	LGBT advocate.
Dalila Fridi		2020	LGBT organizer and activist.
Joel Drake Johnson		2020	Playwright and teacher.
Stephen Kulieke		2020	Journalist and professor of communications/media.
Matt Stuczynski		2020	Educator and founder of the Chicago chapter of GLSEN.
Michelle Zacarias		2020	Activist and journalist.
Judy Baar Topinka	(1944–2014)	2020	Friend of the community.
Brenetta Howell Barrett		2020	Friend of the community.
National Museum of Mexican Art		2020	Friend of the community.
The Legacy Project		2020	Organization for researching and preserving the historical legacies of LGBT people.
The Windy City Times		2020	Chicago LGBT newspaper.
Women & Children First (bookstore)		2020	Feminist bookstore.
Terry Lynn Gaskins		2020	Photographer and humanitarian.
Raymond Crossman		2020	President of Adler University.
Ronald J. Ehemann		2020	Lawyer, writer, and LGBT advocate
John Ademola Adewoye		2020	Advocate for LGBT asylum seekers.
Caprice Carthans		2020	Advocate and volunteer.
Ginni Clemmens	(1936–2003)	2021	Songwriter, musician
Lisa Isadora Cruz	(1958-)	2021	Advocate for Latinx LGBT communities
Lana Hostetler	(1941–1999)	2021	Professor, lobbyist
Thomas Hunt		2021	Nightclub promoter, activist
Wayne Johnson		2021	Graphic designer, actor, television presenter
Otis Mack		2021	Comedian, promoter, emcee
PrideChicago		2021	Community organization
Ralphi Rosario	(1959-)	2021	DJ, music producer
Betty Lark Ross		2021	Teacher, activist, photographer
Urban Pride		2021	Organizing in Chicago's African American LGBT community
Kirk Williamson		2021	Writer, journalist
Maya Green		2022	educator, physician
Zahara Monique Bassett		2022	activist, advocate
Matthew Harvat		2022	DJ, Producer, performance artist, Drag performer
Paul Highfield		2022	Volunteer, fundraiser
Thomas (T.L.) Noble		2022	"designer, talent booker and promotional maven for Dugan's Bistro."
Joey Soloway	(1965- )	2022	award-winning television and stage writer, director, producer and activist.
Dan Wolf	(1945–2022)	2022	Holocaust Survivor, owner of Lakeview's The Bagel
Windy City Performer Arts		2022	Originally the Windy City Gay Chorus, advocacy for gender expression and sexual orientation equality.
Outspoken (Chicago)		2022	monthly LGBT storytelling showcase
Homocore Chicago		2022	Concert promoters
Patricia "Patty the Pin Lady" Latham	(1943- 2022)	2022	Friend of the community
Illinois Holocaust Museum and Education Center		2022	"advocates for LGBT rights and the inclusion of LGBT history in classrooms, museums and places of public memory."
Season of Concern Chicago		2022	"Fundraising and support organization in the theater community that's provided financial assistance to people affected by illness, injury or health-related circumstances. It's also donated to local HIV/AIDS service organizations for more than 30 years."
Linda Bubon	(1951- )	2023	Founded Women & Children First Bookstore
Andrew Davis		2023	Journalist, editor-in-chief of Windy City Times
Jan Dee		2023	Owner of Jan Dee Jewelry
Anna DeShawn	(1983 - )	2023	Founder of E3 Radio, "the only radio station in the country dedicated to playing queer music and reporting on queer news"
Margaret Hillis	(1921–1998)	2023	Founded and led the Chicago Symphony Orchestra Chorus for 37 years
Joseph Loundy		2023	First mental health professional at Gay Horizons
Robert Neubert		2023	Planned events for LGBT nonprofits such as Equality Illinois, AIDS Foundation Chicago, Howard Brown Health, PFLAG, the Center on Halsted, Chicago House, the Human Rights Campaign, and the 2006 Gay Games
Col. Jennifer Pritzker	(1950- )	2023	Outspoken advocate for issues, such as transgender military ban, founder of TAWANI Foundation
Terence Alan Smith, aka Joan Jett Blakk	(1957- )	2023	Politician, founder of the Chicago chapter of Queer Nation
avery r. young		2023	First ever Chicago Poet Laureate
Ann & Robert H. Lurie Children's Hospital of Chicago Gender Development Program		2023	"First and largest multidisciplinary program in the Midwest providing a full range of medical, behavioral health, and social support services to gender-diverse children, transgender adolescents, and other patient-families navigating issues related to gender and gender development."
Black Alphabet		2023	"World's oldest and largest Black LGBTQ+ focused arts organization"

== See also ==
- LGBT culture in Chicago
- List of LGBT people from Chicago
- Legacy Walk
- Center on Halsted
- Boystown
