= James Monroe Smith =

James Monroe Smith may refer to:

- James Monroe Smith (Georgia planter) (1839–1915), planter and state legislator in Georgia
- James Monroe Smith (academic administrator) (1888–1949), American educator and academic administrator in Louisiana
- James Monroe Smith (lawyer), member of the Chicago LGBT Hall of Fame

== See also ==
- James Smith (disambiguation)
