= Caryn Berman =

American social worker

Caryn Berman was a Chicago-based social worker.

== Biography ==
Caryn was born in Rosedale, Queens to Paul and Rachel Berman. She was the wife for 36 years of Laura Cuzzillo. Berman and Cuzillo married May 22, 2010, in Des Moines, Iowa.

While attending SUNY Stony brook, Berman worked for the Centers for Disease Control and Prevention getting transferred in 1976 to Chicago. While there, she ended up getting her master's degree from the University of Chicago School of Social Service Administration in 1980.

She died September 1, 2014, after a five-year battle with ovarian cancer at the age of 61.

== Career ==
Motivated by the 1985 neath of a friend from HIV/AIDS, Berman became an AIDS educator, policymaker and service provider at Center on Halsted (formerly known as Horizons Community Services), Heartland Alliance, and the AIDS Foundation of Chicago.

While working as a clinical social worker at Evanston Hospital, Berman “developed a groundbreaking sex-education program for persons with chronic mental illness” before going into private psychotherapy practice, part time.

At the University of Illinois at Chicago, she was the Illinois program director of the Midwest AIDS Training and Education Center, training more than 25,000 health care professionals.

== Legacy ==
In 1995, Berman was inducted into the Chicago LGBT Hall of Fame.
