= Joanne E. Trapani =

American activist and politician (1949–2020)

- Born: August 5, 1949; Corona, Queens, New York
- Died: November 29, 2020 (aged 71)
- Occupation(s): Politician, activist

Joanne E. Trapani (August 5, 1949 – November 29, 2020) was an American activist and politician. She was the first open lesbian elected official in Illinois when she won a seat on the village board of Oak Park in 1997, and she was inducted into the Chicago LGBT Hall of Fame in 1993.

== Early life ==
Trapani was born in Corona, Queens, New York City, the daughter of Joseph Trapani and Mariska (Mary) Horvath Trapani. Her mother was born in Hungary. Trapani completed a bachelor's degree and two master's degrees at New York University.

== Career ==
Trapani worked on Wall Street as a young woman. She was an early member of the Gay Activists Alliance and the Manhattan Women's Political Caucus in New York City. She served on the board of directors of the Mattachine Society, and was a founding member of Lesbian Feminist Liberation.

Trapani moved to Illinois in 1976, and co-chaired the Illinois Gay and Lesbian Task Force. She lobbied for the Illinois Human Rights Amendment, and human rights ordinances in Cook County and Oak Park. She served as a staffer for the Cook County Commission on Human Rights, investigating complaints, writing reports, recommending remedies, and holding training workshops, from 1993 until 2011. She made public statements to oppose "outing" as an activist tactic against conservative politicians: "I might like to see someone come out of the closet, but I'll be damned if I am going to kick that door open for anyone," she said in 1990. She was an early supporter of Barack Obama, hosting a fundraiser for his 1996 Illinois Senate campaign in her backyard.

In 1997, she was elected to the Oak Park village board, which made her the first open lesbian elected official in Illinois. From 2001 to 2005, she was president of the Oak Park village board. She also served on the zoning commission in Elmwood Park, Illinois.

Trapani was named Woman of the Year by Gay Chicago magazine, and was honored by Dignity-Chicago and IMPACT. In 1993 she was inducted into the Chicago LGBT Hall of Fame.

== Personal life ==
Trapani married her longtime partner, Mary Becker, in a commitment ceremony in 1996, and legally in 2018. Trapani died in 2020, from endometrial cancer, at the age of 71.
