= Katherine Duffy =

Katherine “Kit” Duffy
- Born: 1944; Hagerstown, Maryland
- Died: December 22, 2015 (aged 70–71)
- Known for: First liaison to the gay and lesbian community in Chicago

Katherine “Kit” Duffy (1944, Hagerstown, Maryland-December 22, 2015) was the first liaison to the gay and lesbian community in Chicago. She was appointed in 1984 by Mayor Harold Washington. Her concerns at the time were AIDS education and issues related to equality and fairness. At the same time, Duffy served as the first executive director of the AIDS Foundation of Chicago.

== Biography ==
Her commitment to activism came from witnessing racial discrimination growing up in Hagerstown, Maryland. She attended Northwestern University beginning in 1964. Duffy died at the age of 71 die to complications of heart surgery.

== Honors and awards ==
Duffy is a 2008 inductee into the Chicago LGBT Hall of Fame. Part of the reason for her induction was the role she played in securing the passage of the ordinance, in 1988, of the Chicago ordinance that banned discrimination against gays and lesbians.

== Legacy ==
When Duffy died, longtime gay rights activist Rick Garcia said Duffy was the “midwife of the modern gay-rights movement in Illinois.”
