= Sid Mohn =

Sid L. Mohn
- Occupations: American clergyman for the United Church of Christ, LGBT activist

Sid L. Mohn is an American clergyman for the United Church of Christ. He is also a LGBTQ activist.

== Biography ==
Mohn was raised on a rural Pennsylvania farm, in a conservative Dutch Anabaptist family. His childhood revolved around the church, leading to a calling to serve within it.

Mohn is a graduate of Temple University. He obtained his Master of Divinity from the School of Theology at Claremont College in California, and earned his doctorate from McCormick Theological Seminary in Chicago.

Though the Presbyterian Church declined Mohn, the United Church of Christ invited him to join, and he became an ordained minister. Mohn's background and education resonated with the Chicago-based Heartland Alliance, where he became president in 1980 and served until 2015.

In 1981, the AIDS epidemic emerged, heavily impacting the gay community. Mohn played a crucial role in founding one of the first AIDS specialty clinics at Cook County Hospital and helped create one of the nation's inaugural integrated housing facilities for individuals with AIDS and HIV. He connected the fervor over housing integration to the hysteria regarding dental care for AIDS patients.

Mohn also served as the head of the Travelers & Immigrants Aid.

== Recognition ==
Mohn received accolades from the Chicago Tribune as a "Person to Watch in '87" and the 1989 Human Rights Award from the Guatemalan Information Center.

In 1989, he was honored as the United Way of Chicago's Executive Director of the Year. Additionally, Mohn was the recipient of the 1991 Paul Goldman Award from the Chicago Gay and Lesbian Interfaith Congress and the Wright Human Relations Award from the Chicago Commission on Human Relations.

John was inducted into the Chicago LGBT Hall of Fame in 1993.
