= Marcia J. Lipetz =

Marcia Lipetz was a leader in the nonprofit community of Chicago and Louisville. She was an advocate for LGBTQ rights, women's rights, and social justice.

She helped set up the Center on Halsted. She served as the first full time executive director of the AIDS Foundation of Chicago and the Alphawood Foundation, previously the WPWR-TV Channel 50 Foundation. She served on the board of the Kentucky and Illinois chapters of the American Civil Liberties Union.

After spending 11 years at Alphawood, Lipetz became president and CEO of the Executive Services Corps of Chicago. She also did consulting at her own firm.

== Biography ==
She was born and raised in Louisville, Kentucky, in 1947 to parents who were social workers. She was raised in a Jewish family where she was immersed in tikkun olam and was involved in interfaith work. She attended Seneca High School MCA an integrated high school where she was involved in civil-rights work.

She graduated from Douglass Residential College of Rutgers University–New Brunswick before earning a master's in sociology from Ohio State University and a doctorate in the same subject from Northwestern University.

After graduating, she returned to Louisville where she taught at the community college, served on the boards of Planned Parenthood and the ACLU. She worked to get the Equal Rights Amendment ratified by the Kentucky legislature.

She taught as an adjunct professor for the Department of Public Administration at the University of Illinois Chicago. She also taught at Northwestern University and Spertus College.

Lipetz died September 11, 2018, at the age of 71 at her home in Evanston, Illinois, that she shared with her wife, Lynda Crawford. The cause of death was cancer.

== Honors and awards ==
Lipetz was inducted into the Chicago LGBT Hall of Fame in 2009 because of her “leadership, energy, passion, and vision for Chicago’s LGBT community and the institutions affiliated with it, especially for her work with the AIDS Foundation of Chicago, the WPWR-TV Channel 50 Foundation, and Center on Halsted.”

== Select publications ==
- Snyder, D. S. (1981). [Review of Essential Sociology, by R. L. Ellis & M. J. Lipetz]. Teaching Sociology, 8(4), 445–447. https://doi.org/10.2307/1317080
