= Zahara Monique Bassett =

American social service agency founder

Zahara Monique Bassett is the founder and CEO of Life Is Work. Life is Work is a social service agency on the West Side of Chicago. She is known for advocating for trans human rights, social justice, health equity, and LGBT equality.

== Biography ==
Bassett grew up in the Garfield Park neighborhood of Chicago. She would travel to the North Side of Chicago for a variety of reasons. As a black, transgender woman, she felt her neighborhood lacked gender-affirming resources. The fourth of six children, she was kicked out of her house when she was 15 years old because she had already identified as trans for a few years. Sometimes homeless, she was often a sex worker for thirteen years.

== Career ==
Her experiences finding resources in her community led her to find Life is Work in 2015 to serve black and brown clients by providing case management, advocacy and activism. In 2021, she joined the AIDS Foundation of Chicago’s Learning Centre Collaborative and was appointed by Governor J. B. Pritzker to the Health and Human Services Task Force.

== Recognition ==
Bassett was inducted into the Chicago LGBT Hall of Fame in 2022.

The Chicago Foundation for Women awarded her The Impact Award.

She earned the Román Buenrostro Legacy Award in 2023.
