= Daniel Wolf =

Daniel, Dan or Danny Wolf or Wolfe may refer to:

- Dan Wolf (publisher) (1915–1996), American writer and publisher, founder of The Village Voice
- Dan Wolf (businessman, born 1945) (1945–2022), Czech-born Holocaust survivor and businessman in Chicago
- Dan Wolf (New Hampshire politician) (born 1947), American politician
- Dan Wolf (born 1957), American politician in Massachusetts and founder of Cape Air
- Daniel Wolfe (born 1960), American health activist and writer
- Daniel James Wolf (born 1961), American composer
- Danny Wolfe (1976–2010), Canadian gangster
- Christoph Lode (born 1977), German novelist who uses the pseudonym Daniel Wolf
- Daniel Wolf (footballer) (born 1985), Austrian footballer
- Danny Wolf (born 2004), American-Israeli basketball player

== See also ==
- Daniel Woolf (born 1958), British-Canadian historian and university administrator
- Daniel Wulf (born 1980), Australian rules footballer
- Dana Wolfe (born 1963), Canadian writer
- Dana Wolf, fictional character in the German TV soap opera Verbotene Liebe, see List of Verbotene Liebe cast members
- Danyelle Wolf (born 1988), American boxer and mixed martial artist
