= Arlene Halko =

American scientist (1933–2007)

- Born: April 15, 1933; Chicago, Illinois
- Died: March 22, 2007 (aged 73); Chicago, Illinois
- Occupations: Medical physicist, gay rights advocate
- Known for: Chicago LGBT Hall of Fame

Arlene A. Halko (April 15, 1933 – March 22, 2007) was an American medical physicist and gay rights advocate, based in Chicago. She was inducted into the Chicago LGBT Hall of Fame in 1996.

== Early life ==
Halko was born in Chicago, the daughter of Peter Halko and Frances Maciejewski Halko. Her father was an immigrant from Czechoslovakia. She attended Visitation High School and Mundelein College. She completed doctoral studies in physics at the University of Rochester.

== Career ==
Halko was a medical physicist, and was on the staffs at Michael Reese Hospital and Cook County Hospital, both in Chicago. She was Clinical Assistant Professor of Radiology at the University of Illinois College of Medicine. Her research was published in academic journals. She was the first lesbian president of Dignity/Chicago, an organization of gay Catholics. In 1985 she co-founded Chicago House, a social service agency assisting people with HIV/AIDS who needed housing, hospice care, and other supports. From 1982 to 1989, she was a co-owner of Piggens Pub, a lesbian bar. In 2000, she and fellow activist Marie J. Kuda co-founded the Jeannette Howard Foster Memorial Sewing Circle and Book Club, dedicated to preserving Chicago lesbian history.

Halko was named Woman of the Year by Gay Chicago Magazine in 1988; she was honored by the Illinois Gay and Lesbian Task Force in 1990. In 1996 she was inducted into the Chicago LGBT Hall of Fame.

== Publications ==
- Burke, Gerald, Arlene Halko, Gerald Peskin (1970) Determination of Cardiac Output by Radioisotope Angiography and the Image-Intensifier Scintillation Camera. Journal of Nuclear Medicine 12 (3): 112–116. According to Google Scholar, it has been cited 26 times.
- Burke, Gerald, Arlene Halko. Dynamic Clinical Studies with Radionuclides and the Scintillation Camera. Annals of Internal Medicine vol. 70 (5): 1107
- Gerald E. Selverstein, Gerald Burke, David Goldberg, Arlene Halko (1969). Superior Vena Caval System Obstruction Caused by Benign Endothoracic Goiter. Diseases of the Chest vol.56 (6): 519–523 According to Google Scholar, it has been cited 43 times.

== Personal life ==
Halko retired in 1993, and volunteered in an animal rescue in her later years, reuniting lost pets with their owners. She had a leg amputation in 2006, and she died from heart failure in 2007, aged 73 years, survived by her partner of 16 years, Patricia Keenan.
