= Nancy Katz =

Nancy Katz may refer to:

- Nancy J. Katz, American judge
- Nancy Lee Katz (1947–2018), American photographer
