= Patricia Latham =

LGBTQ activist (1943–2022)

Patricia “Patty the Pin Lady” Latham (May 9, 1943 – June 4, 2022) was a LGBTQ activist and AIDS fundraiser known for selling pins in Chicago. As of 2017, she had raised over $50,000. At the time of that estimate, she had been fundraising for over 25 years and battling stage 3 Melanoma for eight years. in 2022, she was a posthumous inductee into the Chicago LGBT Hall of Fame.

== Fundraising career ==
While living in Hawaii in the late 1980s, Latham met a man with AIDS but would not accept financial assistance. A friend suggested selling red ribbons and after she got some, took her to Halstead and Roscoe. Within an hour, she sold all the ribbons and made $20.

For 22 years, Patty worked with Open Hand Chicago, which evolved into Vital Bridges and then Heartland Alliance. She continued fundraising for the Gay Liberation Network.

== Assault ==
Two 28-year-old men assaulted Latham on December 10, 2011, when she was eating lunch on North Clark Street, while fundraising in Rogers Park, Chicago.
