= Caprice Carthans =

American activist

Caprice Carthans is a trans advocate and author. She has served as the trans coordinator for Gay Men's Health Crisis. In 2020, she joined the Integrated Community Advisory Board (CAB) at the AIDS Foundation of Chicago (AFC). She is an inductee of the Chicago LGBT Hall of Fame in 2020.

Carthans, as of August 2022, is a member of the AFC Board of Directors and CAB.

== Biography ==
=== Transgender ===
When she was eleven, Carthans came out as trans to her mother, whom she found very supportive.

=== HIV ===
She grew restless while studying at Chicago State University so she moved to New York City where she lived for about thirty years. It was there, in 1999, that she was diagnosed with HIV. When she was unable to afford living in NYC any longer, she returned to the place she considered home which is Chicago and got case management services from Christian Community Health Center (CCHC).

== Honors and awards ==
Her awards include the 2017 National Transgender Testing Day Advocate and was the Chicago Department of Public Health HIV Trailblazer. She was featured in the 2018 book by Kehrer Verlag called To Survive on this Shore.

In 2019, she was one of two honored on the Transgender Day of Remembrance.
