= Artemis Singers =

American lesbian feminist chorus

- Choir
- Founded: December 1980
- Genre: Female composers, lyricists, or arrangers
- Headquarters: Chicago, Illinois
- Website: artemissingers.org

Artemis Singers is an American lesbian feminist chorus based in Chicago, Illinois and a member of the feminist chorus cooperative Sister Singers Network. Named after the Greek goddess Artemis, its goals are to create positive change in cultural attitudes toward women and female artists and to "increase the visibility of lesbian feminists."

Founded in 1980, it is one of the earliest lesbian feminist choruses in the United States. In 1983, Artemis was the only lesbian chorus to take part in the first national gay and lesbian choral festival, titled Come Out and Sing Together. In 2008, Artemis was inducted into the Chicago Gay and Lesbian Hall of Fame. The group only performs music created by female composers or lyricists, or arranged by female arrangers. Over the years, Artemis has sung music by many women, including women's music movement artists such as Holly Near and Kay Gardner (composer). During the group's early period, they had an assigned traditional music director (Susan Schleef) but the system gradually evolved into a self-organized, non-hierarchical system. Currently, several members act as music directors during each performance.

== Selected performances ==
- 1983 - Come Out and Sing Together: First gathering of gay and lesbian choruses at Lincoln Center in New York City
- 1984 - First National Women’s Choral Festival
- 1986 - Hosted third National Women’s Choral Festival in Chicago
- 1987 - Participated in “A Show of Concern: The Heart of America Responds,” a fundraising event for the AIDS Foundation of Chicago at the Chicago Theater
- 2003 - Produced a concert to benefit the Lesbian Community Cancer Project (LCCP)
- 2006 - Performed at Jay Pritzker Pavilion at Millennium Park as part of Gay Games VII
- 2010 - Hosted 10th Sister Singers Network festival, “Our Kind of Sound” in Chicago
- 2013 - Performed at the March on Springfield for Marriage Equality
- 2013 - Illinois Marriage Equality Bill Signing by Governor Patrick Quinn at UIC Forum in Chicago

== Discography ==
- ARTEMIS SINGERS: 25 Years (2005)

== Awards ==
- 1982 - Paul R. Goldman Award, ONE of Chicago - for outstanding contributions in the field of performing arts in Chicago
- 2008 - Chicago LGBT Hall of Fame
