= Michelle Zacarias =

American journalist

- Education: University of Illinois Urbana-Champaign; USC Gould School of Law
- Occupations: Journalist; Adjunct professor

Michelle Zacarias is an American journalist, activist and academic. She has written for several publications, and was an adjunct instructor at the USC Annenberg School for Communication and Journalism.

== Life ==
Zacarias received a bachelor's degree in English and Philosophy at University of Illinois Urbana-Champaign in 2013, and graduated with a Masters in Studies of Law and a Certification of Law, Social Justice and Diversity at the USC Gould School of Law. Zacarias has written for Teen Vogue, CALÓ NEWS, The Triibe, Latina Mag, People's World, New America, and City Bureau.

A native of the West Side, Chicago, Zacarias is also a disabled, queer Latina organizer. She is one of four founders of the Trans Liberation Collective (TLC) to fight anti-transgender bathroom bills. Zacarias is a board member of Brave Space Alliance, a non-profit in South Side, Chicago. She presented on disability awareness at the U.S. Consulate at Ho Chi Minh City, Vietnam. She was selected by UC Berkeley Graduate School of Journalism for the 2023-25 California Local News Fellowship for the Latino Media Collaborative.

== Recognition ==
Zacarias was awarded the 2018 Saul Miller Excellence in Journalism Award, and was inducted to the Chicago LGBT Hall of Fame in 2020.
