= Brett Shingledecker =

Social figure

- Born: 1962 (age 63–64); Lima, Ohio
- Known for: Co-founder of People Like Us

Brett Shingledecker, a native of Lima, Ohio, was one of the two founders of People Like Us, Chicago’s first gay and lesbian bookstores. He was inducted into the Chicago LGBT Hall of Fame in 2011.

== Early life ==
He was born in 1962. A graduate of George Washington University, Shingledecker went to Evanston, Illinois after graduating in 1987 and began working at the Northlight Theatre.

== Career ==
=== People like Us ===
Reading And the Band Played On by Randy Shilts gave Shingledecker the idea to become active in the LGBT community. He decided to approach Carrie Barnett about opening a gay and lesbian bookstore and they went ahead with the idea. The store was open from 1988 until 1997. However, he sold his half to Barnett in 1994.

=== Post People like Us career ===
Shingledecker went on to become an inaugural judge at the Lambda Literary Awards. For the American Booksellers Association, he taught people thinking of becoming booksellers. He was a juror for the Chicago Gay and Lesbian Film Festival.
