= Ronald E. Bogan =

African-American gay police officer

- Known for: First out Chicago policeman

Ron Bogan is an American police officer. He was the first male police officer in Chicago to come out as gay. Fellow officer Mary Boyle was the first out officer. By coming out to the Chicago Tribune, eventually the CPD Chicago Police Department began actively recruiting homosexual officers and acceptance of LGBT officers increased.

== Family and education ==
He knew he was gay since he was a little boy, living with his two sisters (one of whom is lesbian), his mother and great-grandmother, who helped raise him and knew he was gay, in Chicago. They lived in the Ida B. Wells Homes on the South Side of Chicago.

Bogan attended Dunbar High School (now Dunbar Vocational High School). He knew then he wanted to be a police officer but Mayor Richard J. Daley was fighting when it came to desegregating the CPD. He attended Eastern Illinois University with the hopes that what he studied there could get him a job until he was able to get a job as a police officer. He was president of his fraternity, Phi Beta Sigma and the first sophomore to be picked resident assistant.

He graduated with a BA in speech communication and radio/TV production with a teacher certification which led to substitute teaching for three years at the grammar school he had attended. He became the Midwest Regional Personnel Administrator at the Controlled Data Corporation when he was 25. He finally became a police officer in December 1978 and retired in 2007.

He married his long-term partner, Curtis Lewis, in 2014.

== Career ==
Bogan spent nearly 30 years on the force before he retired. After his retirement, Bogan became the Chicago Department of Human Services’ Emergency Services Deputy Commissioner.

=== Coming out as gay ===
He moved to work on hate crimes in the Civil Rights Division in 1992 that he came out to the Trib. Because there was a requirement to be out as a gay person at the CPD, it led to his being recruited by the Civil Rights division so he could help recruit other gay and lesbian people.

When he started at the Civil Rights Division, crimes against gays were the largest number of cases followed by Anti- Semitic and then racially based.

== Honors and awards ==
The Chicago LGBT Hall of Fame inducted him in 2016.
