= Nancy Lanoue =

- Born: May 30, 1952 (age 74)
- Education: Columbia University, MA; Sarah Lawrence College, BA
- Known for: Women's health advocacy and martial arts education

Nancy Lanoue (born May 30, 1952) is a women's health advocate and self-defense instructor, with both areas focusing on the LGBTQ+ community.

== Early life ==
Lanoue was born the youngest of three children. Her father was Frederick Lanoue, a swimming coach and the inventor of "drownproofing." From when she was six years old, Lanoue taught alongside her father. When Frederick Lanoue died of a cerebral hemorrhage while teaching his method to Marine Corps recruits, she became the instructor, teaching his method over the summer.

At eighteen, Lanoue went to Sarah Lawrence College. Her mother died six months into her time in college. She then completed a joint master's degree at Columbia University in journalism and international affairs.

== Career ==
Lanoue worked as a reporter for the New York Post and Reader's Digest Press. She took self-defense courses to feel safer while on assignment. Lanoue studied Seido karate under its founder, Shihan Tadashi Nakamura, and discovered a passion for the practice.

In 1979, Lanoue founded the Safety Fitness Exchange (SAFE) in New York City. SAFE was the city's first community organization specializing in women's self-defense and rape prevention.

In 1984, Lanoue and her partner, Jeanette Pappas, moved to Chicago, hoping to build a gym and self-defense training center. They opened The Women's Gym in 1985, which became a gathering location for lesbians. Two years later, Lanoue was diagnosed with breast cancer. She had a mastectomy and underwent chemotherapy. Two years after Lanoue's diagnosis, Pappas was diagnosed with pancreatic cancer. The couple closed the gym in 1989 as they pursued treatments for Pappas in California. Pappas worked to provide information about breast cancer to Chicago's lesbian community. Lanoue continued with this after Pappas died in 1989.

In 1990, Lanoue opened Thousand Waves Spa a center focused on women. The next year, her new partner, Sarah Ludden, moved to Chicago from California to assist in running the organization, expanding to the Thousand Waves Martial Arts & Self-Defense Center. As the organization grew, it expanded to provide classes for children, and then for adults of all genders. Lanoue served as the training consultant for the Pink Angels Anti-Violence Project.

In 1994, Lanoue competed in the 1994 Gay Games, winning a gold medal in the black belt masters Kata division and a bronze medal in the sparring competition for women thirty-five and over.

== Cancer advocacy ==
In October 1990, Lanoue was involved in the first gathering of lesbians in Chicago concerned about cancer. She went on to co-found the Lesbian Community Cancer Project (LCCP). She served as its first board president.

== Awards and honors ==
- 1993: Inducted into Chicago LGBT Hall of Fame
- 1998: Honored at 7th annual Lesbian Community Cancer Project Coming Out Against Cancer benefit
