= Tonda L. Hughes =

American academic

Tonda L. Hughes PhD, RN
- Born: Kentucky, United States
- Education: University of Illinois-Chicago (PhD); University of Kentucky (MSN); Eastern Kentucky University (BSN)
- Known for: Lesbian health, substance abuse, health disparities research, global health, nursing research, women's health
- Awards: Fellow AAN; International Nurse Researcher Hall of Fame
- Scientific career
- Fields: Substance abuse, Lesbian health
- Workplaces: Columbia University; University of Illinois-Chicago
- Thesis: Chief nurse executives' responses to chemically-dependent nurses (1989)
- Doctoral advisor: Beverly McElmurry
- Website: www.nursing.columbia.edu/profile/tondahughes

Tonda Hughes is an American professor of nursing (in psychiatry) and associate dean for global health research at the School of Nursing at Columbia University. She is best known for her research of factors influencing the health of sexual minority women (lesbian and bisexual), particularly in the area of substance use. Hughes is the principal investigator of the Chicago Health and Life Experiences of Women Study, the longest-running longitudinal study of sexual minority women's health, with a focus on alcohol use and mental health.

Hughes is a visiting professor at Oxford Brookes University, and honorary professor at both Deakin University and University of Technology Sydney Faculty of Nursing and Midwifery. Prior to joining Columbia University in 2017, Hughes was a Collegiate Professor and associate dean for Global Health at the University of Illinois-Chicago College of Nursing. She was a visiting professor at the University of Melbourne from 2009 to 2014. In 2003, Hughes was inducted into the Chicago Gay and Lesbian Hall of Fame.

In 2001, Hughes was named as a fellow of the American Academy of Nursing. In 2014, she received the Betty Ford Award from the Association of Medical Education and Research in Substance Abuse and in 2015 was inducted into the Sigma Theta Tau International Nurse Researcher Hall of Fame. In 2017, Hughes received the Global Alliance for Behavioral Health and Social Justice Recognition Award. In 2026, Hughes received the inaugural Sigma Theta Tau International Honor Society of Nursing/DAISY Foundation Nurse Scientist Leadership award.

She is a member of the University of Kentucky Hall of Fame. In 2017, she received the Achievement Award from the Gay and Lesbian Medical Association. In 2025, Hughes won the Award for Advancement of International Research Collaboration on Alcohol awarded by the International Kettil Bruun Society for Social and Epidemiological Research on Alcohol for her collaborative works.

== Personal life ==
Hughes was raised in rural southeastern Kentucky. Her father was a coal miner, and WWII veteran. Her mother was a painter. Hughes is openly lesbian. She came out while studying for a master's degree at the University of Kentucky.
