= Mary Morten =

American film director

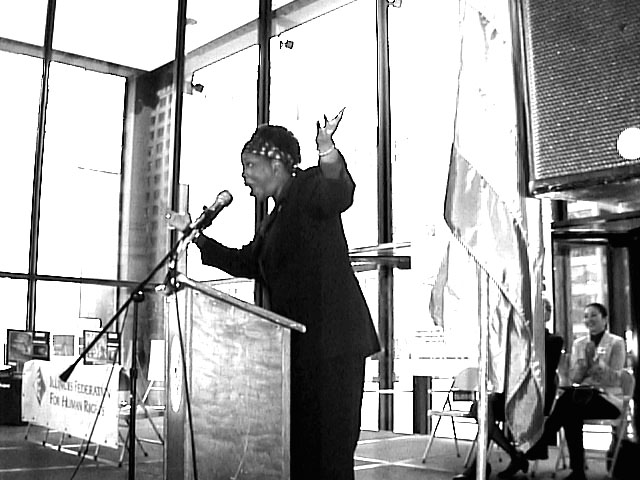
- Morten in 1999.
- Occupation: Activist

Mary Morten, is an activist in Chicago. Morten was the first African-American president of the Chicago chapter of the National Organization for Women (NOW), is an author and filmmaker on African-American lesbian experiences, and led organizations including the Chicago Abortion Fund and Chicago Foundation for Women. Morten directed the City of Chicago's Advisory Council on Gay and Lesbian issues in 1996. That year, she was inducted into the Chicago Gay and Lesbian Hall of Fame.

== Biography ==
As a volunteer in Geraldine Ferraro's 1984 vice-presidential campaign visited the local chapter of the National Organization for Women (NOW) and decided to change the lack she saw there of women of color. "I walked in and never left," she said. Morten later became president of NOW and led groups including the Women's Self-Employment Project and Chicago Abortion Fund.

In 1996 Morten became a member of A Real Read, Chicago's African American Lesbigaytrans Performance Ensemble, which aimed to represent a community with dual minority status in race and sexual orientation. A Real Read addressed issues including HIV and AIDS prevention, homophobia, religion, women and transgender issues. They used poetry, prose, music, and vignettes in performances.

At the mayor's office Morten led the community-based coalition for It's Elementary, an educational film for use in staff development trainings for Chicago Public Schools, and developed the anti-racism project The Color Triangle, for the LGBT community. Morten helped to found the Illinois Safe Schools Alliance and is a former board member of Chicago's Center on Halsted and of the National Gay and Lesbian Task Force.

In 2000, Morten was named director of anti-violence prevention office for the Chicago Department of Public Health (CDPH). Morten coordinated CDPH's citywide violence prevention efforts and was responsible for the implementation of Prevent Violence! Chicago, the city's strategic violence prevention plan.

In 2007 Morten became associate and interim executive director for the Chicago Foundation for Women. Morten worked with Barack Obama beginning he was a state senator in the late 1990s. She said "Barack is totally comfortable with gay people...he mentioned gays in his announcement speech in Springfield, Ill., which he didn't have to do. But it's not just a media opportunity with him. He is part of the community."

Morten also worked on Obama's presidential campaign.

== Work ==
Morten is the president of Morten Group, which specializes in social change through skills development, public policy and advocacy for women, people of color and the LGBTQ community.
