= Ginni Clemmens =

American musician (1936–2003)

- Born: Virginia Mae Clemmens; February 28, 1936; Evergreen Park, Illinois, U.S.
- Died: February 15, 2003 (aged 66); Maui, Hawai'i, U.S.
- Occupations: Musician, songwriter

Virginia Mae "Ginni" Clemmens (February 28, 1936 – February 15, 2003) was an American folk musician and songwriter in the genres of women's music and children's music. She was inducted into the Chicago LGBT Hall of Fame in 2021.

== Early life and education ==
Clemmens was born in Evergreen Park, Illinois and raised in the suburbs of Chicago, the daughter of Glenn Edward Clemmens and Dorothy Cleo Groves Clemmens (later Friday). Her father was a big band musician and World War II veteran; her parents divorced in 1946, and both remarried. She attended high school and trained as a nurse in California.

== Career ==
Clemmens worked as a pediatric nurse in California, and sometimes played her guitar or banjo for her young patients. Back in Chicago, she taught guitar and banjo classes at the Old Town School of Folk Music. She performed in folk clubs and at music festivals and benefit concerts from the 1950s through the 1980s. Her first album, Sing a Rainbow (1965), and another, We All Have a Song (1977) featured children's music, and she performed in schools as part of Urban Gateways, a non-profit program to bring cultural programs to Chicago city schools.

In 1976 Clemmens started her own label, Open Door Records, and released several more albums. She also helped to produce the compilation album, Gay and Straight Together (1980). She organized and performed at women's music festivals in the 1970s and 1980s.

== Discography ==
- Sing a Rainbow and Other Songs for Children (1965)
- I'm Looking for Some Longtime Friends (1976)
- We All Have a Song (1977)
- Wild Women Don’t Get the Blues (1981)
- Lopin Along Thru the Cosmos (1983)
- Underneath Hawaiian Skies (2001)

== Personal life ==
Clemmens came out as a lesbian in the late 1970s. "When Ginni did come out, it was with a bang," said journalist Marie J. Cuda. She moved to Hawaii in 1988. She died in 2003, at the age of 66, from injuries sustained in a car accident on Maui. In 2021, she was posthumously inducted into the Chicago LGBT Hall of Fame.
