= Gary Chichester =

American gay rights activist (born c. 1947)

Gary G. Chichester (born c. 1947) is an American gay rights activist best known as a co-founder of the Chicago Gay Alliance (CGA) and as a principal organizer of Chicago's first Pride March in 1970.

== Early life and education ==
Chichester was born circa 1947, on Chicago's North Side and spent his childhood in the Old Town neighborhood before his family moved first to Budlong Woods and later to the suburb of Niles.

== Career ==
Chichester helped launch the Chicago Gay Alliance in spring 1971. Under Chichester's leadership the Alliance also negotiated with city officials for permits to stage what became Chicago's first officially sanctioned Pride March in 1971; the previous year's demonstration, which he also helped stage, had been a flash-mob style “Gay Liberation March” up State Street to the Civic Center.

During the run-up to the 1970 event, Chichester famously silk-screened rainbow-striped banners on the back porch of his Lake View flat, using a sewing machine borrowed from an upstairs neighbor who turned out to be a vice-squad officer.

Chichester was inducted as a member of the Chicago LGBT Hall of Fame in 1992 and later received its Jon-Henri Damski Award.
