= Bon Foster =

American lawyer (1955-1991)

- Born: Robert Bonvouloir Foster; 1955
- Died: 1991 (aged 35–36)
- Occupation: Lawyer

Robert Bonvouloir "Bon" Foster (1955–1991) was an American lawyer.

== Biography ==
Foster was born in Ann Arbor, Michigan in 1955. He studied at the Massachusetts Institute of Technology and graduated with a bachelor's degree in urban studies and a master's degree in city planning. Later, he went to the Northwestern University Law School to complete his law degree. He clerked for U.S. District Judge Milton Shadur.

Foster started his career with the Illinois Bureau of the Budget and the Illinois Department of Transportation. Later, he worked for law firms such as Jenner & Block and Schiff Hardin & Waite.

Foster was the founder of the Lesbian and Gay Bar Association of Chicago.

== Death and legacy ==
In 1991, Foster died due to AIDS.

The Bon Foster event, Bon Foster Civil Rights Celebration, and Bon Foster Memorial Lecture Series are named after him.

== Recognition ==
- 2003: Chicago LGBT Hall of Fame
