= Maya Green =

- Education: Alabama A&M University, BS in Biology; University of Illinois College of Medicine, Chicago’s MD/MPH program
- Occupation: Chief Medical Officer at Howard Brown Health
- Known for: Founder of HIV Real Talk

Maya Green is the Chief Medical Officer at Chicago’s Howard Brown Health and the founder of HIV Real Talk which is a community based HIV screening and prevention program. Green was an educator, in both private and public schools, before getting her medical training. She also serves on the AMA-LGBT Medical Advisory Committee.

When COVID-19 became a major issue in the black and brown communities of Chicago, she established the first testing center in South Side, Chicago followed by one on the West Side.

== Biography ==
She grew up in Chatam, which is now called Roseland. She attended Whitney Young High School but was let go a year early due to her grades and behavior. She finished at a Christian school called Liberty Temple.

Green graduated from Alabama A&M University with a Bachelor of Science degree in biology before going on to the University of Illinois College of Medicine in Chicago’s MD/MPH program. She did her family medicine residency at Jackson Memorial Hospital in Miami and completed a HIV Medicine Fellowship at the Rush University Medical Center/HIV Medicine Association.

== Recognition ==
In 2022, Green was inducted into the Chicago LGBT Hall of Fame. Other awards include Crain’s Chicago Business’ Notable Healthcare Hero as well as the Chicago Defender's Women of Excellence 2021 Award.
