= Renae Ogletree =

Chicago activist

- Born: August 2, 1950; Passaic, New Jersey
- Died: April 23, 2010 (aged 59)
- Occupation: Activist
- Known for: Co-founder of the Chicago Black Lesbians and Gays organization

Renae Ogletree (August 2, 1950 – April 23, 2010) was an activist in Chicago known for co-founding the Chicago Black Lesbians and Gays organization.

Ogletree was born in Passaic, New Jersey, one of six children. She attended Georgian Court University and Montclair State University. She moved to Chicago to work for the Boys & Girls Clubs.

Ogletree advocated for youth through various organizations including the Better Boys Foundation, the Chapin Hall Center for Children, and the Chicago Youth Agency Partnership. In addition to co-founding Chicago Black Lesbians and Gays, Ogletree was involved with the LGBT organizations, including AIDS Walk Chicago, the National Black Lesbian and Gay Leadership Forum, and the Lesbian Community Cancer Project.

In 1997, she received the Chicago Commission on Human Relations Award. Ogletree was inducted into the Chicago LGBT Hall of Fame in 1998

Ogletree died on April 23, 2010. Congressman Mike Quigley delivered a eulogy for Ogletree on the United States House of Representatives floor on April 28, 2010.
