= Marge Summit =

American LGBTQ activist (1935–2023)

- Born: September 3, 1935; Chicago, Illinois
- Died: May 16, 2023 (aged 87)
- Occupation: LGBT activist
- Known for: Co-founded Chicago PFLAG

Marge Summit (September 3, 1935 – May 16, 2023) was an American LGBTQ activist.

== Career ==
Summit was born in Chicago on September 3, 1935.

Summit co-founded the city's Parents and Friends of Lesbians and Gays (PFLAG) branch and launched the "Gay$" initiative. Summit owned His 'n Hers, a bar-restaurant, which due to circumstances was relocated from the Addison L stop to North Broadway.

Throughout the 1970s and early 1980s, Summit's establishment provided a platform for emerging LGBTQ+ artists and was recognized for its distinctive live entertainment and burgers. She also produced the record "Gay and Straight Together."

Summit contributed to the documentary Before Stonewall and co-produced Crimes of Hate, both focusing on LGBTQ+ history and challenges. As an activist, she participated in Mattachine Midwest and PFLAG, and alongside Frank Kellas, initiated the "Gay $ Project."

Summit also organized AIDS awareness events and fundraisers for entities such as Chicago House. As an adoptive parent, she demonstrated LGBTQ+ individuals' capability to provide loving homes.

Summit was honored by the Gay Chicago and Mattachine Midwest, among others.

Summit was married to Janan Lindley. She died on May 16, 2023, at the age of 87.

== Recognition ==
- Jon-Henri Damski Award
