= Avery r. young =

American poet

avery r. young
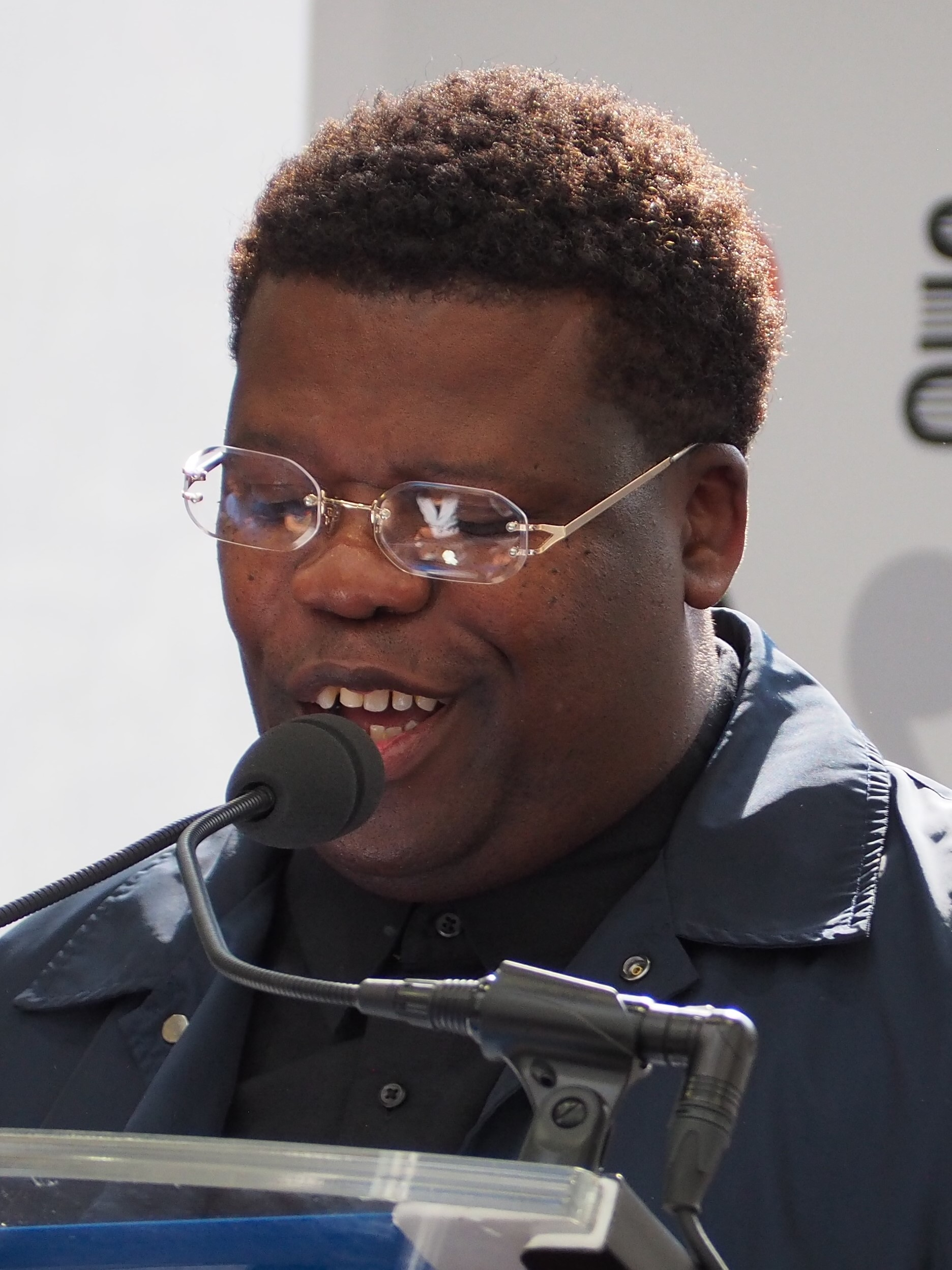
- Young in 2024
- Born: Chicago, Illinois, U.S.
- Education: Loyola University Chicago
- Occupation: Poet
- Writing career
- Notable awards: Chicago LGBT Hall of Fame (2023)

Avery R. Young (stylized in all lowercase) is an American poet. His work includes the poetry volume neckbone as well as the albums booker t. soltreyne: a race rekkid and tubman. In 2023, he was appointed Poet Laureate of Chicago and inducted to the Chicago LGBT Hall of Fame.

== Biography ==
=== Early life and career ===
Avery R. Young was born in Chicago; his ancestors were from Lexington, Mississippi. Raised in the West Side neighborhood of Austin, he studied at Hanson Park Elementary School, Mather High School and Loyola University Chicago, earning a BA in English.

Young became interested in poetry as a young child after reading Arnold Adoff's I Am the Darker Brother and appearing at a Chicago Public Schools oratory contest. In the 1990s, he began working in the spoken word scene, with one of his works dedicated to revolutionary Fred Hampton.

=== Poetry ===
Young's work has appeared in several anthologies, including The Golden Shovel Anthology. In 2019, he published his poetry volume neckbone through TriQuarterly. He has also worked at Bridge magazine as poetry editor. Deirdre Robinson of the South Side Weekly said of Young: "when he's onstage, his powerful voice fills the room and his impassioned words serve as a testimonial that speak to the realities of the Black experience."

On April 24, 2023, he was named Poet Laureate by the city of Chicago, serving for two years; he was the first person appointed for the newly-created Poet Laureate program.

=== Career outside of poetry ===
Young is leader of avery r. young & de deacon board, a blues/funk/gospel band. He has released two albums through FPE Records: booker t. soltreyne: a race rekkid (2013) and the spoken poetry album tubman. Jose Luis Benavides of Newcity Music said that Young's music is blk folk and neo-soul and called him "notorious for blowing the roof of venues throughout Chicago". He was vocalist for Nicole Mitchell's Mandorla Awakening II: Emerging Worlds; John Corbett of DownBeat said that despite Young's vocals the lyrics were "evocative, political and symbolic—not plot-driven".

Young is part of The Floating Museum, a non-profit art collective that depicts Chicago neighborhoods as galleries of a museum that Chicago itself represents. He has worked as a teaching artist for University of Chicago's Arts + Public Life and non-profit Urban Gateways.

Young's opera safronia had its world premiere at the Lyric Opera of Chicago in April, 2026. Lyric Opera describes it as follows: "Triumph and tragedy converge in this universal yet personal story of the Great Migration. This Afro-surrealist tale is told through the eyes of the Booker family, who return from the northern U.S. to their Southern hometown after five years of banishment to bury their patriarch. First conceived following young’s groundbreaking collaboration with Lyric around Twilight: Gods in 2021, safronia marries folklore, poetry, and history, with music inspired by gospel, blues, funk, and soul."

=== Accolades and personal life ===
In 2022, Young received the Leader for a New Chicago award. In 2023, Young, an out gay man, was inducted into Chicago LGBT Hall of Fame. He is also a Cave Canem Foundation Fellow.
