= Richard Lee Gray =

American activist

- Born: Chicago, Illinois
- Occupation: Activist

Richard Lee Gray is an American activist.

== Biography ==
Born in Chicago, Gray has been active in the city's social justice and arts scenes. He was interested in photography since his teenage years and has used his skill to capture significant events, including a speech by Martin Luther King Jr. in his South Side neighborhood.

Gray retired after twenty years as a social worker with the Illinois Department of Children and Family Services. During his tenure, he co-founded the Kupona Network in 1984, the first African American AIDS service organizations.

In the late 1980s, Gray began a long affiliation with John Marshall High School on Chicago's West Side, where he worked on the school's medical program "AIDS and Other Matters." He currently serves as the volunteer coordinator of Support Services for Gay, Lesbian, Bisexual, and Transgender Youth at the school.

In 1992, Gray was inducted into the Gay and Lesbian Hall of Fame in Chicago in recognition of his community work.

Gray is also a writer and poet, currently working on a project titled "...9/11 etc.," which he describes as an Afrocentric response to 9/11.

Through "We Are Here!," Gray aims to bring visibility to the African American LGBTQ+ community and pave a path for future generations. His previous exhibits include "Just Married".

== Recognition ==
- Chicago LGBT Hall of Fame (1992)
