= Glen Pietrandoni =

- Born: 1956 (age 68–69); Oak Park, Illinois
- Occupation(s): Chief Advocacy Officer, pharmacist

Glen Pietrandoni (born 1956, Oak Park, Illinois) is the Chief Advocacy Officer at Avita Care Solutions. Educated at the St. Louis College of Pharmacy, he had a 30-year career at Walgreens and parent company Walgreens Boots Alliance (WBA), he oversaw HIV and Hepatitis business and strategy.

== Career ==
Before working for WBA, he owned independent pharmacies in the Chicago area. They were acquired by WBA in 1989. As of 2019, his job at Walgreens was to lead “a team responsible for executing the strategy to help patients living with HIV/AIDS, hepatitis, organ transplants and inflammatory diseases.”

Glen also worked for the White House National Office of AIDS Policy, the Centers for Disease Control and Prevention and the United States Department of Health and Human Services.

== Recognition ==
Pietrandoni is a 2017 inductee into the Chicago LGBT Hall of Fame.
