= Thom Dombkowski =

American activist

- Born: Thomas Raymond Dombkowski; June 28, 1950; Rochester, New York
- Died: April 20, 2006 (aged 55); Chicago, Illinois
- Occupations: American activist for HIV/AIDS and LGBT communities
- Known for: Co-founder of IMPACT
- Partner(s): Patrick Rossi, John Shawhan
- Parents: Bernard Dombkowski (father); Helene Skurski (mother)

Thomas Raymond Dombkowski (1950–2006) was an American activist for HIV/AIDS and LGBT communities.

== Biography ==
Dombkowski was born on June 28, 1950, in Rochester, New York to Bernard and Helene (Skurski) Dombkowski. He earned a bachelor's degree from Notre Dame and a Juris Doctor degree from DePaul University. He left a career at the Internal Revenue Service to focus on assisting individuals affected by AIDS.

Dombkowski's contributions included distributing over $150 million to local AIDS service organizations while working at the Chicago Department of Public Health. He co-founded Chicago House, the first support residence for individuals living with AIDS, and served as its second executive director. Additionally, he was a staff writer for Howard Brown Memorial Clinic.

As a volunteer, Dombkowski co-founded IMPACT, a political organization, and was a major donor to the Gay and Lesbian Victory Fund. He funded the feasibility study that led to the development of the Center on Halsted by Horizons Community Services and initiated the creation of the Gay & Lesbian Hall of Fame.

Dombkowski was also deeply involved in Chicago's gay leather community since 1970 and mentored by John F.G. Shawhan. He participated in contests, such as Mr. Gold Coast, and contributed significantly to International Mr. Leather (IML), serving as its chief judge for a decade. Moreover, he judged other competitions, including Mr. Philadelphia Leather and International Ms. Leather. Dombkowski was a charter member of the Old Girls Network (OGN) and co-founded the Chicago Leather Kennel Club with Chuck Windemuth in February 2004.

== Death ==
Dombkowski died at his home in Chicago on April 20, 2006.

== Recognition ==
- Chicago LGBT Hall of Fame (1992)
