= Richard W. Pfeiffer =

American LGBTQ activist

- Born: Richard William Pfeiffer; May 14, 1949
- Died: October 6, 2019 (aged 70)
- Spouse: William Frye (m. 1971)

Richard William Pfeiffer was an American LGBTQ rights activist. He coordinated the Chicago Pride Parade for fifty years and contributed to gay activist organizations.

== Biography ==
Pfieffer was born on May 14, 1949. Pfeiffer died October 6, 2019, at the age of 70. At the time of his death, he had been with husband Tim Frye for 48 years. Pfieffer's funeral was held at Drake & Son Funeral Home in West Edgewater.

== Career ==
During his career, Pfeiffer was a volunteer marshal at Chicago Pride Parade from 1971 to 1973 and coordinated the parade from 1974 for fifty years until 2019.

As a student, he established Chicago city college's inaugural gay student organization, volunteered at Horizons Community Services (now Center on Halsted), and presided over the organization in the mid-1970s. Additionally, Pfeiffer founded the Gay Speaker's Bureau, which facilitated discussions on LGBTQ+ topics in educational and religious institutions, with Pfeiffer delivering up to six lectures per week at the organization's peak.

Pfeiffer wrote a monthly column for Chicago Gay Crusader newspaper from 1973 to 1975. He then wrote on a weekly basis for GayLife for three years until the late 1970s.

Pfeiffer's contributions included serving on the mayor's Advisory Council on gay and lesbian issues between 1985 and 1994 under three successive mayors. In 1993, he was inducted into the Chicago LGBT Hall of Fame.
