= Mary D. Powers =

Civil rights activist

Mary Downey Powers (September 10, 1922 – June 25, 2016) was a Chicago-area civil rights activist. Her work included advocating for police accountability and gay and lesbian rights. Powers is a 1992 inductee into the Chicago LGBT Hall of Fame.

== Biography ==
Powers grew up in East Lansing and Flint, Michigan, and graduated from the University of Wisconsin–Madison with a sociology degree. After marrying William Powers, with whom she had three children, they settled in Winnetka, Illinois, later living in Wilmette, Illinois. She died at the age of 93 on June 25, 2016, at Evanston Hospital.

== Career ==
Powers was a founder of a police watchdog group called Citizens Alert. The group was vital in having cameras installed in police interrogation rooms and for reparations for the victims of Commander Jon Burge.

She worked to bring Martin Luther King Jr. to Winnetka's Village Green for a speech in 1965.

She became Vice President of the Alliance to End Repression in 1969.

Powers worked for Western Electric from 1946 until 1950. Her work with the LGBT community began there having met employees fearing they could lose their jobs if their sexuality was made known.
