= Charlotte Newfeld =

American LGBTQ activist (1930–2022)

- Charlotte Newfeld
- Born: Charlotte Aronson; November 26, 1930; Chicago, Illinois, US
- Died: November 17, 2022 (aged 91)
- Occupation: LGBTQ activist

Charlotte Newfeld (née Aronson; November 26, 1930 – November 17, 2022) was an American LGBTQ activist and politician.

== Biography ==
Newfeld was born on November 26, 1930, in Chicago. During her graduate studies at the University of Wisconsin-Madison until 1951, Newfeld became aware of the gay community and the challenges they faced, especially in the early days of McCarthyism. After moving to Chicago and establishing her art career with the help of several gay artists, she wrote columns for Gay Life, urging the LGBTQ+ community to engage in politics.

In 1982, Newfeld ran for city council in the 46th Ward and, as vice chair, advocated for Sarah Craig's appointment as the Chicago Commission on Women's first openly lesbian member. She collaborated with Harold Washington to form the Mayor's Committee on Gay and Lesbian Issues and pushed for the city's gay-inclusive human rights ordinance. Newfeld also joined efforts to increase AIDS funding and education alongside activists Danny Sotomayor and Art Johnston. In 1996 she was inducted into the Chicago LGBT Hall of Fame as a friend of the community.

Newfeld served as the project director for the Bill Jarvis Migratory Bird Sanctuary, supervising volunteers who maintain the eight-acre sanctuary.

Newfeld died on November 17, 2022, aged 91.
