= Betty Lark Ross =

American photographer

- Occupation: Art teacher
- Known for: One of the first out teachers in Chicago

Betty Lark Ross is a retired art teacher who taught at Latin School of Chicago specializing in photography and printmaking. She was one of the first out teachers in Chicago.

== Advocacy ==
Ross was one of the founding members and later co-chair of the Chicago chapter of GLSTN (Gay, Lesbian, and Straight Teachers’ Network) which later became GLSEN. Ross also served on their National Board. She participated in many GLSEN Youth Leadership Summits, their Midwest Conference on Ending Homophobia in Schools.

=== Advocacy work at her school ===
Ross was an advisor to the Latin School’s gay-straight alliance for 25 years and the first out lesbian on the Independent Schools Association of the Central States diversity committee.

== Artwork ==
Ross has photographed the Gay Games in Chicago, Pride Parades, and Dyke Marches.

== Honors and awards ==
Ross was inducted into the Chicago LGBT Hall of Fame in 2021.

== Personal life ==
Ross is married to Becky Flory. They participate in the Halsted Street Halloween Parade and the city’s CowParade.
