= Big Chicks =

Gay bar in Chicago, US

- Location within Chicago metropolitan area Location within Illinois
- Address: 5024 N Sheridan Rd; Uptown, Chicago, Illinois; United States
- Coordinates: 41.974°N 87.655°W
- Type: Gay bar

Construction
- Opened: 1986

Website
- bigchicks.squarespace.com

Big Chicks is a gay bar and neighborhood restaurant that opened in 1986 in Uptown, Chicago. It serves as a diverse community space for the LGBTQ community, the Chicago art scene, and the kink community. Both Big Chicks and neighboring restaurant Tweet are owned by Michelle Fire.

== History & Overview ==
Big Chicks opened on December 11th, 1986 and is located in Chicago's Uptown community area. Prior to this, the location had been a bar since 1944, primarily catering to military veterans and other local clientele; when Michelle Fire purchased the bar in 1986, she inherited these bar regulars (and their dogs) as well as the bar's original bartenders.

The name of the bar was inspired by an experience Fire had on a trip to India, where she was referred to as "Big Chick" by men in Bandra.

Over time, Big Chicks has become an "informal gay community center" in Uptown. During the height of the HIV/AIDS crisis, the bar served as a hub for HIV education and medical outreach to the LGBTQ community. Over the years Big Chicks has hosted drag shows, political events, poetry readings, and musical performances.

In 2016, the bar was inducted into the Chicago LGBT Hall of Fame.

Big Chicks is also known as an informal art gallery space, having hosted works by Diane Arbus, Manuel Alvarez Bravo, Leon Golub, Tony Fitzpatrick, Lee Godie and Hollis Sigler, among many others. The art on display comes from Michelle Fire's own collection.

Big Chicks is a cash-only establishment. Tweet, the adjoining restaurant, is also owned by Michelle Fire, and provides the food which can be ordered in the bar.
