= Rick Garcia (activist) =

American LGBTQ activist (1956–2026)

- Born: September 15, 1956; St. Louis, Missouri, U.S.
- Died: January 12, 2026 (aged 69)
- Occupation: LGBT activist
- Known for: Co-founded Equality Illinois

Rick Garcia (September 15, 1956 – January 12, 2026) was an American LGBTQ activist known primarily for his work in Chicago and for LGBTQ acceptance within the Roman Catholic Church. As a co-founder of Equality Illinois, he advocated for equal treatment and social justice for the LGBTQ community.

== Biography ==
Garcia was born on September 15, 1956, to parents of Spanish descent and grew up in the "Spanish Colony" neighborhood of St. Louis. He attended Saint Louis University. While there, he was first thrust into the media spotlight after he was filmed confronting a Catholic priest and theology professor who had just given a speech on the "sins of homosexuality". Garcia, who had told no one he was gay, was at first fearful of reactions, but his family and the nuns he was then working with responded positively. Garcia was already working with the United Farm Workers in Missouri, and decided to expand to gay rights activism, soon joining the local Dignity chapter.

In 1980, he moved to Washington, D.C., where he began working with Maryland's New Ways Ministries, a Catholic organization focused on the gay and lesbian community. He also spent time living in New York City.

After moving to Chicago in 1986, Garcia became a significant figure in the successful 15-year campaign for a 1988 ordinance prohibiting sexual-orientation discrimination as part of the activist group known as the "Gang of Four," working under the auspices of the Gay & Lesbian Town Meeting organization. He later contributed to the passage of the Cook County Human Rights Ordinance in 1993.

He co-founded Equality Illinois in 1992, advocating for statewide protections against discrimination. He continued to work with the organization until 2010. He helped establish the national Federation of Statewide Lesbian, Gay, Bisexual and Transgender Political Organizations and was a staff member of The Civil Rights Agenda from 2012. In the 21st century, Garcia also advocated for statewide discrimination protections and same-sex marriage.

== Personal and later life ==
Garcia, who was a devout Catholic, worked within the Roman Catholic Church and with various political groups to support LGBTQ+ rights.

Garcia met his partner, Ernie Hunsperger (d. 2020), in New York City in the 1980s. Hunsperger was also an activist, and worked alongside Garcia until his retirement in 2007. Garcia died on January 12, 2026, at the age of 69, from heart failure.

== Recognition ==
- Chicago LGBT Hall of Fame (inducted 1999)
