= Barbara Smith (activist) =

Chicago activist

Barbara "Robie" Smith
- Barbara "Robie" Smith
- Born: May 25, 1946
- Died: February 14, 2015 (aged 68)
- Occupation: Activist
- Known for: Co-founder of the Affinity Community Services foundation

Barbara "Robie" Smith (1946–2015) was an American activist from Chicago known for co-founding the Affinity Community Services foundation, a support group for Black lesbians, in 1995.

== Biography ==
Smith was born on May 25, 1946. She attended Chicago State University (CSU) and had a career in accounting and real estate. She was active in the Chicago LGBT community. In addition to co-founding the Affinity Community Services she worked with a variety of organizations including the Chicago Foundation for Women, the Crossroads Fund, the Lesbian Community Care Project, and Women Women of All Cultures Together (WACT).

Smith died on February 14, 2015. She was inducted posthumously into the Chicago LGBT Hall of Fame in 2015. Affinity Community Services established The Barbara "Robbie" Smith Award of Excellence in her honor.
