= Lorrainne Sade Baskerville =

American activist

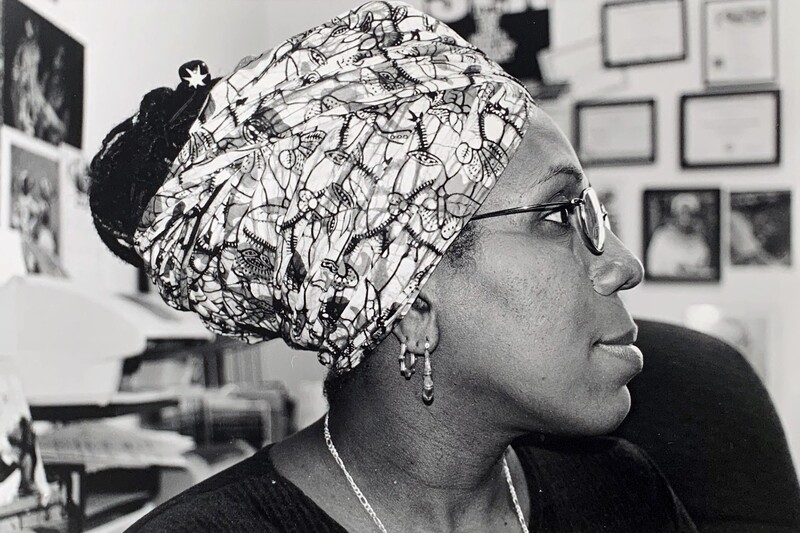
- Born: 1951; Chicago, Illinois
- Died: 2026 (aged 74–75)
- Education: Associate in Applied Science, Harold Washington College Bachelor of Arts, Northeastern Illinois University
- Occupations: Social worker, activist
- Known for: Founder of transGENESIS
- Awards: Chicago LGBT Hall of Fame Georgia Black Award Bayard Rustin Award

Lorrainne Sade Baskerville was an American social worker, activist, and trans woman best known for founding transgender advocacy group transGENESIS. After living in Chicago for most of her life, Baskerville moved to Thailand in the early 2000s.

== Life and career ==
=== Early life ===
Baskerville was born on the south side of Chicago in 1951. At the time of her birth, Baskerville’s mother was 14. One of seven children, Baskerville left home at 17 in 1968. In the early 1970s, she became a sex worker and started living her life more aligned to her gender identity. During this time she also became familiar with sex workers' conditions and laws prohibiting wearing female clothing. While the Cross-Dressing Law in Chicago was overturned in 1973, Baskerville was still arrested several times. When AIDS struck a member of her family in the mid-1980s, Baskerville began to volunteer at Howard Brown Health Center and Horizons Community Services. She eventually became an HIV/AIDS case manager.

=== Education ===
Baskerville graduated with an Associate in Applied Science with a concentration in Mental Health: Alcoholism & Substance Abuse Counseling from Harold Washington College in 1991. In 1994, she received her Bachelor of Arts from Northeastern Illinois University.

=== Social work and activism ===
Baskerville founded transGENESIS to address issues of gender identity, substance abuse, HIV/AIDS, sex work, harm reduction, and self-empowerment. Programs have included T-PASS (Trans-People Advocating Safer Sex); a weekly drop-in program for youth and young adults, called TransDiva; and a peer-led transgender support and discussion group.

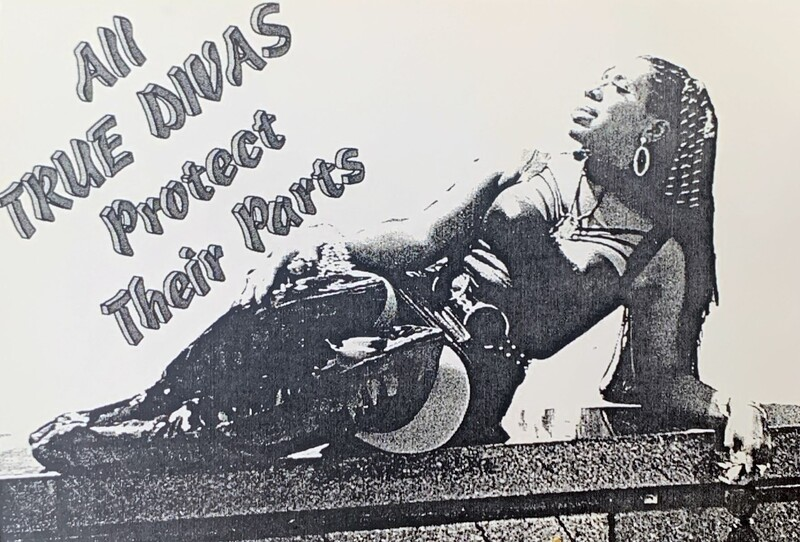
Front of palm card distributed by Baskerville's program T-PASS

As part of the T-PASS program, Baskerville created palm cards with safe sex tips specifically for trans people, with a picture of herself on the front and the phrase "All TRUE DIVAS protect their parts." In 2001, Baskerville and her partner Bruce Lomar rented an office space for transGENESIS in the Uptown neighborhood of Chicago. In the offices, Baskerville and her staff held individual as well as group counseling sessions and provided HIV/AIDS testing.

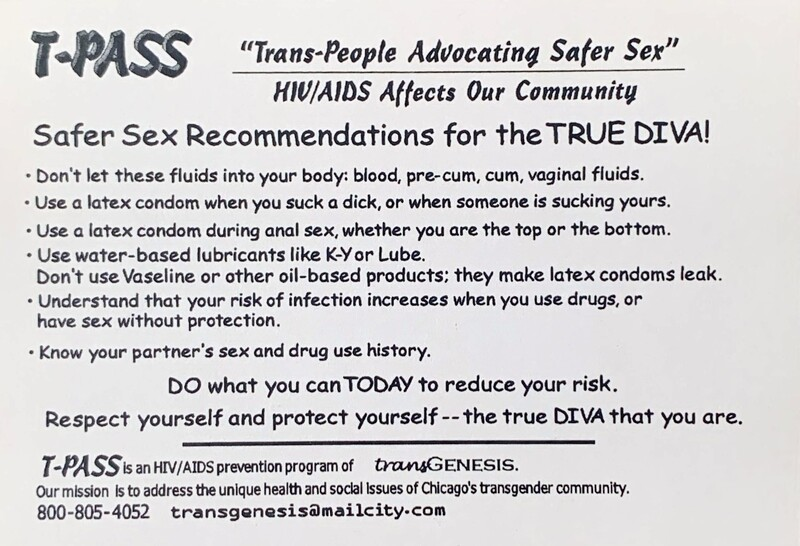
Back of palm card distributed by Baskerville's program T-PASS

In addition to her work with transGENESIS, Baskerville was involved in multiple conferences and panels on issues of trans rights, HIV/AIDS awareness, and anti-LGBT violence. Most notably, Baskerville was invited to speak on a panel with other trans activists at the 13th International AIDS Conference in Durban, South Africa in 2000. In Chicago, she worked for the Test Positive Aware Network (TPAN), the Chicago HIV Prevention Planning Group (HPPG), and the Chicago Police Department's 23rd District Gay and Lesbian Advisory Group.

During the 1990s and early 2000s, Baskerville frequently protested violence against trans people in Chicago. Following the murders of trans women Barretta Williams, Quona Clark, and Christine Page, Baskerville established an emergency fund for trans victims.

=== After transGenesis ===
In 2003, Baskerville made the decision to shut down transGENESIS due to a lack of funding. She moved to Thailand shortly after, where she currently resides. In 2014, she self-published a memoir detailing her experience moving to Thailand, her relationship with her late partner Bruce Lomar and her activist work titled One Trans Woman's Spiritual Journey.

== Awards ==
In 1997, Baskerville received the Greater Chicago Committee's first Georgia Black Award, named after African American transgender woman Georgia Black, for service to the transgender community.

In 2000, Baskerville was inducted into the Chicago LGBT Hall of Fame.

In 2001, Baskerville received a Certificate for Recognition for Professional Leadership from Judy Baar Topinka, Illinois State Treasurer, and a Certificate of Recognition for Community Activism from Cook County (IL) State's Attorney, Richard A. Devine.

In 2002, Baskerville was appointed to the Executive Committee of the National Coalition for LGBT Health.

== Publications ==
- Lorrainne Sade Baskerville (September 4, 2014). One Trans Woman's Spiritual Journey. Bangkok Book House. ISBN 9781633231443.
