= Ortez Alderson =

American political activist and actor (1952–1990)

- Born: 1952; Buffalo, New York, U.S.
- Died: December 21, 1990 (aged 38)
- Organizations: ACT UP; Third World Gay Revolution
- Movement: Anti-war, AIDS activist
- Partner: Arthur Gursch

Ortez Alderson (1952 – December 21, 1990) was an American AIDS, gay rights, and anti-war activist and actor. A member of LGBT community, he was a leader of the Black Caucus of the Chicago Gay Liberation Front, which later became the Third World Gay Revolution, and served a federal prison sentence for destroying files related to the draft for the Vietnam War. In 1987, he was one of the founding members of ACT UP in New York City, and helped to establish its Majority Action Committee representing people of color with HIV and AIDS. Regarded as a "radical elder" within ACT UP, he was involved in organizing numerous demonstrations in the fight for access to healthcare and treatments for people with AIDS, and participated in the group's meetings with NYC Health Commissioner Stephen Joseph as well as the FDA. In 1989, he moved back to Chicago and helped to organize the People of Color and AIDS Conference the following year. He died of complications from AIDS in 1990, and was inducted posthumously into the Chicago LGBT Hall of Fame.

== Early life ==
Alderson was born in 1952 in Buffalo, New York, and grew up in Chicago's South Side. In April 1968, at the age of 15, he was arrested in downtown Chicago after the riots sparked by the assassination of Martin Luther King. Charged with arson, which Alderson said was "ridiculous", he was held in Cook County Jail in Chicago for five months.

== Career ==
=== Early activism and prison ===
In 1969, at the age of 17, Alderson joined the Chicago Gay Liberation Front, and was co-founder and chairman of the organization's Black Caucus, which later became the Third World Gay Revolution.

A militant opponent of the Vietnam War, he was one of the "Pontiac Four" who were arrested on July 29, 1970, for vandalizing the Livingston County Draft Office and destroying files related to the draft. Deemed "mentally unstable" because he was gay, Alderson faced a possible 18 years in prison. He and the other members of the Pontiac Four were initially held in Peoria County Jail in Illinois, until they were freed on bond.

On September 5, 1970, Alderson participated in the Black Panthers Revolutionary People's Constitutional Convention at Temple University in Philadelphia, helping to "mobilize the queer presence" for a workshop on gay rights. The workshop was attended by hundreds of black, white, and Puerto Rican gay men. In October 24, 1970, Gay Flames newsletter in New York City published an editorial by Alderson, "The 'disease' fights back", referring to homosexuality, as the front page story in its sixth issue. An analysis in the Journal of the History of Sexuality later noted the tension in Alderson's article between his condemnation of "what he termed the 'pigs mentality' of the American government" and his critique of "its hypocrisy for extolling the virtues of the Declaration of Independence while simultaneously seeking to repress homosexuals' own 'pursuit of happiness'."

After the Pontiac Four failed to appear for trial on November 16, their bonds were forfeited. On November 25, they surrendered to the FBI in Chicago, and subsequently pleaded guilty to two counts, including damaging federal property and removing draft files. Alderson spent three months in Peoria County Jail, and was sent to the Federal Youth Center in Ashland, Kentucky, for close to a year. While in prison, he tried to organize a chapter of Gay Liberation, and was involved in a confrontation with prison officials on June 28, 1971, after they refused to allow gay inmates to celebrate Gay Pride Day. In August 1971, Alderson was released from federal prison in Kentucky and moved to a halfway house in Chicago. In September, Rising Up Angry newspaper reported that Alderson believed he had been released earlier than the other three members of the Pontiac Four because of his attempts to organize gay prisoners, in "one of only two prison gay liberation chapters in the country".

Following his release from prison, he became a leader in the Third World Gay Revolution. In November 1971, on the first anniversary of the shooting death of James Clay, Jr., a 24-year-old African American man dressed as a woman, by Chicago police officers, Alderson led a march on the 18th District police station in his memory. He also helped to organize the Transvestites Legal Committee, the first transgender political organization in Chicago.

=== Acting ===
In the 1970s, he studied acting and appeared in numerous theater productions, including the Chicago Black Ensemble's Trouble in Mind, described by the Chicago Tribune as "a comedy-drama about a racially mixed cast assembled to perform in an awful 'anti-lynching' play." Alderson was recognized as one of the few "bright spots" in the actual cast. He was also in Hagar's Children at the San Francisco Repertory Company, described by The San Francisco Examiner as "A strong, touching play about a joyless Christmas Eve in a home for disturbed children."

In 1981, Alderson moved to New York City, where he continued to pursue his theater career, acting and directing plays. He worked in black gay theater with playwright and performance artist Assotto Saint. In 1985, Alderson acted in pieces from Saint's Rising to the Love We Need and New Love Songs, at the annual conference of the National Coalition of Black Lesbians and Gays, which was held during Thanksgiving weekend in St. Louis, Missouri. He also appeared in Hooked for Life.

=== ACT UP New York ===
in New York, he worked at the National AIDS Hotline Office in Manhattan. In 1987, Alderson was a founding member of ACT UP, and one of "only a handful of people of color" in the early years. At ACT UP meetings, he was vocal about issues related to people of color and poverty. Together with Robert Vazquez-Pacheco and Robert Garcia, Alderson established the Majority Action Committee (MAC), so named to remind the broader group that the majority of HIV and AIDS cases in the city were people of color. Respected as a "radical elder" and "militant queen" who was always willing to get arrested, Alderson was involved in organizing numerous demonstrations and actions, including sit-ins.

Alderson and activist Dan Keith Williams represented ACT UP at the National Black Leadership Commission on AIDS (NBLCA), which was led by Debra Frazer-Howe. According to Williams, their first meeting with NBLCA in 1987 was confrontational, leading to accusations that they were "sent by the white boys". Alderson and Williams also fought to convince BET (Black Entertainment Television) to broadcast a segment on AIDS in the black community, which finally aired after being canceled three times.

On October 13, 1987, he was one of 800 protesters arrested at a mass sit-in at the United States Supreme Court during the second National March on Washington for Lesbian and Gay Rights. Back in New York, he was one of four protesters ordered to stand trial after 72 individuals were arrested during the Day of Outrage on December 21, 1987, when they climbed onto the train tracks at the Borough Hall IRT subway station in Brooklyn.

Alderson was involved in ACT UP's high-profile confrontations with New York City Health Commissioner Stephen Joseph. In the summer of 1988, he was arrested along with other activists who entered the Department of Health building, representing themselves as the MHA or "Metropolitan Health Association", and demanding a meeting with Joseph. In a subsequent meeting between ACT UP and Joseph on September 15, 1988, Alderson took turns with Jim Eigo and Margaret McCarthy in pointing out problems with the City's "patchwork epidemiology" in underestimating the number of people who were HIV-positive across various segments of the population.

On October 5, 1988, Alderson represented ACT UP New York in a meeting with the United States Food and Drug Administration, together with Eigo, McCarthy, Mark Harrington, and Peter Staley. According to Harrington, Alderson and McCarthy voiced their concerns about the exclusion of people of color, women, drug users, and children from the AIDS drug trials. The FDA staff responded that they were sympathetic, but could not force drug companies to include them in trials.

In November 1988, Commissioner Joseph attended a forum at the Lesbian and Gay Community Services Center, which "devolved into a rancorous confrontation". According to ACT UP activist Ron Goldberg, Alderson brought the forum to a "welcome end" when he "stood up and asked the commissioner whether it wasn't 'the essence of corruption' for the Department of Health to accept a $500,000 grant from the CDC to investigate its own underreporting of epidemiological data", causing Joseph to storm out of the meeting.

In February 1989, Alderson and ten other ACT UP activists were taken to court by Stephen Joseph, and were sentenced to community service after they were found guilty of criminal trespassing.

=== ACT UP Chicago ===
In March 1989, Alderson returned to Chicago. Soon afterwards, he was hospitalized with PCP, but became active in ACT UP Chicago once he recovered. In 1990, he helped to organize the People of Color and AIDS Conference, which took place during the ACT NOW AIDS Actions for Health Care in Chicago, from April 20 to 23.

On April 23, 1990, Alderson was one of 150 AIDS activists arrested in Chicago during a national ACT UP action for universal health care. Several protesters later recalled his charisma before and during the demonstration, including speaking from a balcony and expressing solidarity with the Women's Caucus, on behalf of the People of Color Caucus. Because there were not enough jail cells, the arrested protesters were initially held in a large room, where Alderson periodically incited them to stage a "kiss-in".

In June 1990, Alderson participated in demonstrations at the International AIDS Conference in San Francisco, after which his health rapidly declined. According to Assotto Saint, Alderson continued to demonstrate until the end, "when he could barely walk and talk".

== Personal life and legacy ==
Alderson was in a long-term relationship with activist Arthur Gursch. He and Gursch first met in 1970 as part of the Gay Liberation Front. They both lived in New York in the 1980s and returned to Chicago together in 1989.

On December 21, 1990, Alderson died of complications from AIDS. In 1991, he was inducted posthumously as a member of the Chicago LGBT Hall of Fame.

On October 11, 1992, Gursch emptied a bag containing Alderson's ashes onto the South Lawn of the White House, as part of a coordinated action with ACT UP. Accompanied by hundreds of protesters, Gursch, activist David Robinson, and at least fourteen others marched along the National Mall past the AIDS Memorial Quilt, chanting "Bringing the dead to your door! We won't take it anymore!", and rushed past police to deposit the cremated remains of their loved ones who had died of AIDS onto the White House lawn.

Film footage of Alderson speaking during a 1987 ACT UP meeting in New York, as well as footage of the 1992 Ashes action, appeared briefly in the Oscar-nominated documentary film, How to Survive a Plague (2012), which is dedicated in his memory along with others.

In 2016, his image was featured in a large photomural at the Art AIDS Exhibition in Chicago. The photograph, titled "Stephen Cradling Ortez's Head", shows Alderson grasping a sign saying healthcare is a right and wearing a t-shirt that reads, "We Die – They Do Nothing".

== Publications ==
- —— (October 24, 1970). "The 'disease' fights back". Gay Flames. 6. JSTOR community.28037175. OCLC 16581290.
- —— (January 1, 1972). "On Being Black, Gay, and in Prison: 'There is no humanity'". Motive. Vol. 32, no. 2. pp. 26–27.
