= Peg Grey =

American physical educator

- Born: Margaret Ann Grey; May 15, 1945; Chicago, Illinois
- Died: February 24, 2007 (aged 61); Hinsdale, Illinois
- Occupations: Physical educator, sports organizer

Margaret Ann "Peg" Grey (May 15, 1945 – February 24, 2007) was an American physical education teacher and sports organizer based in Chicago. She was the first female co-chair of the Federation of Gay Games. She was inducted into the Chicago LGBT Hall of Fame in 1992.

== Early life ==
Margaret Grey was born in Chicago, the daughter of Lawrence C. Grey and Dorothy Blyth Grey. Both of her parents were also born in Chicago; her father was a teacher. She graduated from Maria High School in 1963, earned a bachelor's degree in elementary education from Chicago Teachers College, and a master's degree in physical education from Northern Illinois University.

== Career ==
Grey taught physical education at elementary schools in the Chicago Public Schools for 35 years. She was active in the Gay Games, serving as first female co-chair of the Federation of Gay Games, and on the international board of the governing body. She worked for increasing participation by athletes from non-Western nations, and by older athletes. She organized women's softball, basketball, volleyball, bowling, racquetball, and tennis teams and leagues under aegis of the Chicago Metropolitan Sports Association. She was also one of the organizers of Frontrunners Chicago, a running and walking club for the gay and lesbian community.

Grey raised funds for causes including AIDS and cancer research. She competed at Gay Games events in San Francisco (1982), Vancouver (1990), and Chicago (2006), in various sports, including marathon, softball, volleyball, and track and field. She was inducted into the Chicago LGBT Hall of Fame in 1992. She was posthumously inducted into the Chicago Metropolitan Sports Authority Hall of Fame in 2007.

== Personal life and legacy ==
Grey was survived by her partner of 40 years, Grace Leudke, and her companion of 17 years, Pam Hulvey, when she died from multiple myeloma in 2007, aged 61 years, in Hinsdale, Illinois. Her papers and memorabilia, including trophies, t-shirts, and photographs, are in the Gerber/Hart Library and Archives. There is a Peg Grey Women's Sport Tournament held annually in Johannesburg, named in her memory.
