= Adrienne J. Smith =

American psychologist

- Born: 1934
- Died: August 19, 1992 (aged 57–58); Chicago, Illinois
- Occupation: Psychologist

Adrienne J. Smith (1934–1992) was an American psychologist. She came out as a lesbian in 1973 and became one of the first openly out lesbian psychologists in the American Psychological Association (APA). She worked for reforms in the APA and spoke on LGBT rights across the country.

Smith was born in 1934 and grew up in Chicago. Her family was Jewish, but not very religious. She attended the University of Illinois and later earned her doctorate at the University of Chicago. She had her private practice in Chicago and was one of the only options for therapy for many in the LGBT community.

Smith came out on television in 1973 on The David Susskind Show. She was one of the first psychologists in the American Psychological Association (APA) to live as an out lesbian. Her work with the APA helped stop homophobia in the organization. She was a leader in the APA Division 44, the Society for the Psychological Study of Lesbian and Gay Issues and served a term as president.

Smith was co-founder of the Woman's Institute in Chicago. She was an advocate for LGBTQ issues and rights in Chicago and across the country. She also spoke to Chicago City Council and the Illinois House of Representatives about LGBTQ issues. Smith was a co-author of Lesbians at Mid-Life: The Creative Transition.

Smith was inducted into the Chicago Gay and Lesbian Hall of Fame in 1991. She died on August 10, 1992, at the Illinois Masonic Medical Center.

== Publications ==
- Lesbians at Mid-Life; the Creative Transition
- Reflections of a Jewish Lesbian Feminist Activist Therapist
