= Lois L. Bates =

Chicago activist

- Lois L. Bates
- Born: 1970
- Died: 2011 (aged 40–41)
- Occupation: Activist

Lois L. Bates (1970-2011) was an activist in Chicago's transgender community. She was known specifically for her HIV prevention work and her advocacy for trans youth. She was also involved with the Chicago Area Ryan White Services Planning Council, Chicago Windy City Black Pride, the Chicago Transgender Coalition, Lakeview Action, the Minority Outreach Intervention Project. Bates worked for the Howard Brown Health Center. She died at the age of 41.

Bates was inducted posthumously to the Chicago LGBT Hall of Fame in 2012.
