= Rene Van Hulle =

American LGBT activist

Rene Van Hulle Jr.
- Born: 1953
- Died: February 27, 2007 (aged 53–54)

Rene Van Hulle Jr. (1953 – 2007) was an American LGBT activist and writer.

== Biography ==
Van Hulle grew up in Wilmette, Illinois, attended New Trier East High School and graduated in 1971.

In 1977, Van Hulle served as a marshal at a protest rally against Anita Bryant held at Medinah Temple in Chicago. He was also the co-founder of the Tavern Guild of Chicago and one of the founding members of the Royal Imperial Sovereign Barony of Chicago.

Van Hulle was a member of the board of Chicago Housing and Social Service Agency for a short time in the early 1990s. He also wrote columns for Gay Chicago Magazine under the pseudonym Heidi Snoop.

In 2000, Van Hulle was inducted to the Chicago LGBT Hall of Fame.

Van Hulle was sick with AIDS and Lupus and died in a Skokie hospice on February 27, 2007, from AIDS.

== Recognition ==
- Chicago LGBT Hall of Fame (2000)
