= Harley McMillen =

Health care administrator

- Born: 1943
- Died: March 23, 2013 (aged 69–70); Viroqua, Wisconsin
- Occupation: Health care administrator

Harley McMillen was a health care administrator who was executive director of Howard Brown Health in Chicago. He was there in the early stages of the AIDS crisis. He was active in organizing the AIDS Action Project and the AIDS Strategic Plan for the City of Chicago.

== Biography ==
When he developed stage 4 Non-Hodgkin lymphoma, McMillen moved to a small town in Wisconsin which at some point was destroyed by a tornado. He used his professional skills to help rebuild the town.

His cancer eventually went into remission.

He died March 23, 2013, in Viroqua, Wisconsin, at the age of 70.

== Career ==
He was a field representative for the Missouri Office of Aging after graduate school in 1971. McMillen went on to become the Program Development Director on the Health and Human Services study in Florida in 1980.

== Awards and honors ==
The Chicago LGBT Hall of Fame inducted him in 1992.
