= Tony Midnite =

American female impersonator, costume designer, activist, and book reviewer

- Born: Tony Murdoch; September 20, 1926; Texas
- Died: August 31, 2009 (aged 82); Las Vegas, Nevada, U.S.
- Occupations: Female impersonator, costume designer, activist, and book reviewer

Tony Midnite (September 20, 1926 – August 31, 2009) was a female impersonator, costume designer, activist, and book reviewer.

== Early life ==
Midnite was born Tony Murdoch on September 20, 1926 in Texas. He worked in the defense industry at Hunter's Point Navy Yard near San Francisco during World War II. After seeing a female impersonation show at the legendary Finocchio's in San Francisco around 1948, he became a performer himself, starting in Galveston, Texas, transitioning to Hollywood, California, then making his way to Chicago.

== Career ==
Midnite had begun performing with the traveling Jewel Box Revue, America's first racially-inclusive traveling revue of female impersonators. He took a hiatus, however, in 1951 to move to Chicago. His mentor, Stanley Rogers, was the costume designer for the Jewel Box; when Rogers retired, Midnite took over the post. He also opened his own costume design studio in Chicago in 1953 in the basement of the Lorraine Hotel at 411 South Wabash Ave. in the city's Rush Street nightclub area. Though he was having throat troubles in the mid-1950s which caused him to step back from performing for a time, he was nevertheless photographed in full glamour drag regalia in 1955 and 1956 by celebrity and theatrical photographer Maurice Seymour, who stars sought "because of his ability to portray them as they appeared to the audience 100 feet away. He could retouch the photos, enhance their appearance...keep the illusion going."

Midnite eventually performed and designed costumes for four years at Club 82 in New York City. In this time, he created original designs for fellow performers such as Lavern Cummings and Tillie the Dirty Old Lady. As the drag scene boomed not only in Chicago proper but Calumet City and Cicero, with approximately 50 strip clubs abounding, Midnite designed for "all manner of exotic stage performers." In addition, he designed for road shows of Gypsy and Carnival and for the Jewel Box's Broadway production, which debuted at Loew's State Theatre in Times Square. He designed for Club Chesterfield performers as well and worked under the supervision of David Merrick on various productions for the Metropolitan Opera.

He started booking shows for the Jewel Box Revue, inevitably shaping the drag scene at the time with an 8-month-long booking on the South Side of Chicago called 25 Men and a Girl which signaled a drag boom in the region in the 1960s.

Throughout his performance career, he appeared in shows such as Club 82's Fun-Fair for '57 and Club 82 Revue and the Jewel Box's Show Sensation of the Nation, among numerous others. His final performances were in a recurring show called The Fantasy Revue which played at the Granada Lounge and Blue Dahlia Show Lounge in Chicago.

Later in life, Midnite worked as a book reviewer, reviewing for GayLife and other publications.

In 1996, Mayor Richard M. Daley of Chicago inducted Midnite into the Chicago LGBT Hall of Fame.

== Awards ==
- Chicago LGBT Hall of Fame inductee (1996)

== Death ==
Midnite died in Las Vegas, Nevada on August 31, 2009 at the age of 82.
