= Ralph Paul Gernhardt =

American publisher (1934–2006)

- Born: 1934; Chicago, Illinois, U.S.
- Died: June 4, 2006 (aged 72); Chicago, Illinois, U.S.
- Known for: Co-founder of Gay Chicago

Ralph Paul Gernhardt (1934–2006) was an American publisher who co-founded Gay Chicago.

== Life ==
Born in Chicago, Gernhardt served in the U.S. Air Force and pursued a career in radio. He married Marilyn Ridgedale, with whom he had two children. After relocating to Chicago in the early 1970s, Gernhardt taught radio broadcasting before embarking on his LGBT career.

Throughout his career, Gernhardt co-organized the Gay Athletic Association, sponsored sports teams, and was a founding member of the Gay and Lesbian Press Association. He promoted safer-sex practices, supported anonymous HIV testing, and distributed free condoms. He co-founded "Strike Against AIDS," raising significant funds for HIV/AIDS research, and presented the Gay Chicago Magazine Awards from 1977 to 1992.

In 1975, Gernhardt launched a telephone information line and established the Gay Chicago News in 1976, followed by co-publishing the Gay Chicago Magazine with Dan Di Leo in 1977.

Gernhardt died from lung cancer at his home in Chicago on June 4, 2006, at the age of 72.
