= David Cerda =

American dramatist

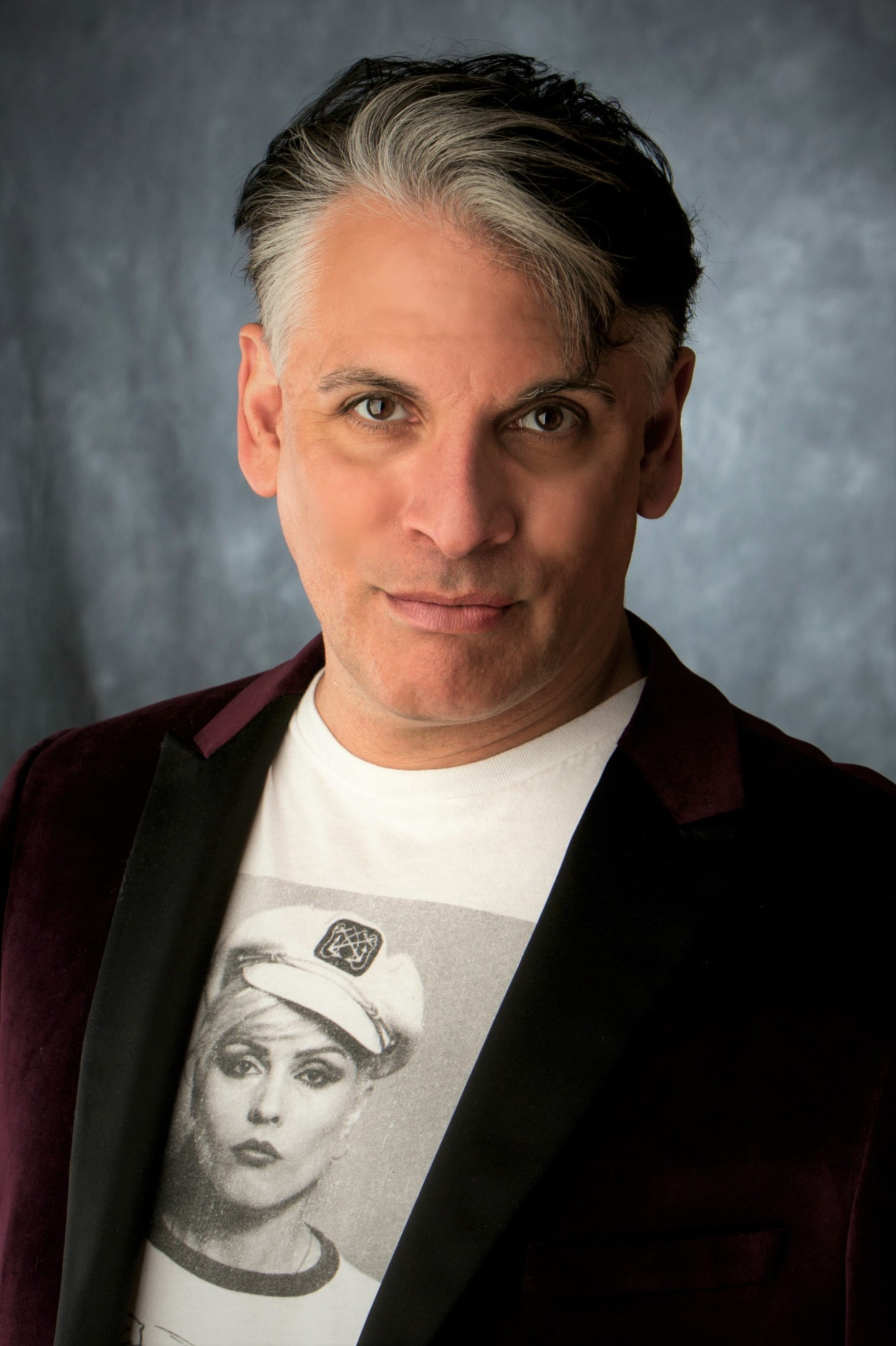
- David Cerda in 2019
- Born: June 13, 1961 (age 65); Hammond, Indiana
- Occupation: Playwright

David Cerda (born June 13, 1961, Hammond, Indiana) is an American performer and playwright based in Chicago. He is currently the artistic director for Hell in a Handbag Productions, which he co-founded in 2002. His campy, highly theatrical plays have made him a notable presence within the Chicago theater scene. He has written and appeared in many of his works, including a transgressive adaptation of Rudolph, the Red-Hosed Reindeer, How ‘What Ever Happened to Baby Jane?’ Happened and POSEIDON! An Upside-Down Musical which won the New York International Fringe Festival Best Ensemble Award and was the most attended show of the festival that year.

Cerda's theatre group has araised money for Chicago LGBT non-profits such as Season of Concern, AIDS Legal Council, Howard Brown, the Legacy Project, Windy City Alliance for the Deaf, and Groceryland.

== Selected works ==
Hell in a Handbag has produced over 70 original plays, of which Cerda has written several.

- The Drag Seed, a parody of The Bad Seed
- Snowgirls: The Musical, a parody of Showgirls
- POSEIDON! An Upside Down Musical (2002, 2009), a musical parody of The Poseidon Adventure
- The Golden Girls: The Lost Episodes (since 2017), a spoof of The Golden Girls
- Rudolph, the Red-Hosed Reindeer, a parody of Rudolph the Red-Nosed Reindeer
- How ‘What Ever Happened to Baby Jane?’ Happened, a parody of What Ever Happened to Baby Jane
- The Birds
- Christmas Dearest
- Caged Dames

== Awards ==
- 2003 - New York International Fringe Festival Excellence Award for Ensemble Performance
- 2016 - Chicago LGBT Hall of Fame
