= Anna DeShawn =

American media personality and podcaster

- Born: August 30, 1983 (age 42); Chicago, Illinois, US
- Education: Drake University (BA); Ithaca College (MS)
- Occupations: Podcaster, producer, writer
- Known for: Founder and CEO of The Qube
- Awards: Chicago LGBT Hall of Fame

Anna DeShawn (born August 30, 1983) is an American media personality, podcaster, and LGBT advocate. She is best known for founding E3 Radio, a radio station dedicated to playing queer music and reporting on queer news. She is also the founder and CEO of The Qube, a podcast production company that focuses on BIPOC and QTPOC podcasts.

== Early life and education ==
DeShawn was born in Chicago, Illinois. Her mother was a business manager and her father was an educator and a dean. She describes growing up in a "religious household" that had "no connection to queerness". In high school, DeShawn served as student body president and was active in National Honor Society, volleyball, basketball, track, softball, band, and choir.

DeShawn went to college for radio and television production, citing Robin Roberts as inspiration: "I wanted to be the next Robin Roberts because she was the only Black woman on ESPN doing sports". In 2005, DeShawn earned her Bachelor of Arts from Drake University. In 2007, she earned her Master of Science in communications from Ithaca College.

== Career and activism ==
One of DeShawn's first experiences in radio was working as an intern for the Tom Joyner Morning Show while studying at Drake. DeShawn describes this experience of being able to "talk to thousands of people and make an impact while wearing sweatpants" as a turning point for her where she "fell in love with radio".

DeShawn started E3 Radio in 2009, which focuses on queer music and reporting on queer news. She cites Ella Baker and Fannie Lou Hamer as inspiration, Black women she did not learn about in grade school: "I can do PSAs about these women and syndicate them to college radio stations, and then we can have a college radio network. That's how [E3 Radio] started". She chose the station name, E3, based on the station's goals: Educate, Enlighten, and Entertain.

In 2014, DeShawn started the "Purple Tie Affair: Concert & Silent Auction" to assist small non-profits making a "big impact".

In 2020, DeShawn founded The Qube, a podcast production company which focuses on BIPOC and QTPOC podcasts. DeShawn hosts the series "Black HIV in the South: How Did We Get Here?" which focuses on the experiences of the Black community in the early days of the HIV/AIDS epidemic in the American South.

DeShawn is a board member of Affinity Community Services, a Chicago-based LGBTQ social justice organization focusing on Black women.

== Awards and honors ==
- In 2012, DeShawn was the recipient of a 30 Under 30 Award from the Windy City Times, an award which honors LGBT individuals
- In 2013, DeShawn was a finalist for an Esteem Award for outstanding podcast
- In 2023, DeShawn was inducted into the Chicago LGBT Hall of Fame for her work celebrating "the overlooked and underrepresented"
- In 2023, DeShawn's podcast Queer News won the 2023 Ambie award for Best DIY Podcast
- In 2023, DeShawn was listed as one of GO Magazine's "100 Women We Love"
- In 2024, DeShawn was awarded the Equality Illinois Community Pride Award for her contributions to Chicago and LGBTQ+ communities
