= Terri Worman =

American activist

- Occupations: American feminist, LGBT advocate

Terri Worman is an American feminist and LGBTQ advocate and focused especially on issues of aging within the LGBTQ community. Worman is an educator, trainer, and consultant.

== Early life ==
She attended Indiana University. Worman is also a classically trained violinist

== Career ==
For a time, she was a ranger at the Women's Rights National Historical Park. In 1989, Worman settled in Chicago, Illinois. Worman started her advocacy work with the pro-choice movement and then evolved into LGBTQ and aging. She has been active in Chicago advocacy groups including the Chicago Task Force on LGBT Aging, the Illinois Prochoice Alliance, and the National Organization for Women: Chicago Chapter (Chicago NOW).

In 2004, Worman was inducted into the Chicago LGBT Hall of Fame. She has written for AARP and works with that association on elder care issues at the state level on advocacy and outreach.

== Personal life ==
Worman is married to wife, Paula Basta.
