= Tania Callaway =

American chef

- Born: 1952; Chicago, Illinois
- Died: 2000 (aged 47–48)
- Occupation: Chef

Tania "Chef Tania" Callaway (1952–2000) was a chef and caterer from Chicago, Illinois. Her parties were legendary in the African-American lesbian community and for about ten years, was chef at Heartland Cafe, beginning in the 1980s.

== Biography ==
A Chicago native, Chef Tania had been a lesbian since she was a teen. Callaway had to resign from Heartland due to lung disease and, in 2000, died of sarcoidosis.

Callaway graduated from Lindbloom High School (now known as Robert Lindblom Math & Science Academy and then culinary school.

== Awards and honors ==
Callaway was inducted into the Chicago LGBT Hall of Fame in 2003. The reasons for her induction were "for nearly 30 years of service in the culinary arts, during which she fostered African American community cohesion through social events large and small and charitable support."
