= Derrick Hicks =

Activist

- Born: Derrick Allen Hicks; 1955; Chicago, Illinois
- Died: 2002 (aged 46–47)
- Known for: Founding member of the Council of Black Gay Men

Derrick Allen Hicks was an American LGBT activist.

== Life ==
Derrick Hicks was born in Chicago, U.S.

Hicks was a founding member of the Council of Black Gay Men and a journalist for a homosexual publication in Chicago in the 1970s. He also founded a magazine named Diplomat during the same period. In the 1980s, he joined the first Washington, DC, AIDS task team. To combat the spread of HIV in the West Side community, he helped establish the Greater Chicago Committee in the early 1990s.

In 1999, Hicks was inducted to the Chicago LGBT Hall of Fame.

Hicks was a member of the Chicago HIV Prevention Planning Group and St. Joseph Hospital's HIV Advisory Board. He co-chaired Langston Hughes–Eleanor Roosevelt Democratic Club and also headed the Black Lesbian and Gay Community Center.

== Recognition ==
- Chicago LGBT Hall of Fame (1999)
