= Nancy J. Katz =

American judge

Nancy J. Katz is a retired judge from the Cook County Circuit Court, having served until 2017. She was the court's first openly lesbian judge.

== Biography ==
Katz graduated from Northeastern Illinois University in 1977 and from Chicago-Kent College of Law in 1983.

Katz began her activism in the 1970s, volunteering with the Lesbian Feminist Center in Chicago and Women in Crisis Can Act (WICCA).

Katz has contributed to family law and LGBT rights and held positions on boards including the Lesbian and Gay Bar Association of Chicago and Cook County Hospital's Women and Children with AIDS Project.

In 2017, she received the Community Leadership Award from the Illinois State Bar Association. She was inducted into the Chicago LGBT Hall of Fame in 2000. After her judicial service, Katz affiliated with the JAMS Foundation, focusing on family-law mediation and arbitration.
