= Dan Wolf (businessman, born 1945) =

Holocaust survivor and businessman (1945–2022)

- Born: 1945; Theresienstadt concentration camp, Terezín, Czechoslovakia
- Died: July 1 or 3, 2022 (Aged 77)
- Known for: Holocaust survivor and third-generation owner of the Bagel
- Spouse: Mitchell Kaufman

Dan Wolf (1945 – July 1 or 3, 2022) was a Holocaust survivor and third-generation owner of the Bagel, a Jewish deli in Chicago, Illinois, founded in the early 1950s. His first job there was typing up the menus when he was seven years old, because he was the only family member who was fluent in English.

== Biography ==
Wolf was born in 1945 in Theresienstadt concentration camp, a Czech WWII Nazi concentration camp established by the SS. When he was four years old, he and his parents, Ruth and Edward Wolf, and grandparents Chaim and Elsa Golenzer, emigrated to the United States. They opened the Bagel in 1950 in Albany Park, Chicago, Illinois. In 1992, they relocated to Lakeview. They also had a location in Skokie. The Skokie location opened in 1987 and closed in 2018.

He was active in the Lakeview East Chamber of Commerce for over 35 years.

He was married for 60 years to Mitchell Kaufman.

Wolf died on July 1, 2022 (Chicago says he died July 3) at the age of 77. He was buried in Arlington Heights, Illinois, at Shalom Memorial Park.

== Honors and awards ==
Dan, who went by Danny, was posthumously inducted into the Chicago LGBT Hall of Fame.
