= James Monroe Smith (lawyer) =

American lawyer (1957–2003)

James Monroe Smith (1957–2003) was an American lawyer focused on HIV/AIDS-related issues.

== Biography ==
Born in Connecticut, he moved to Chicago in 1982 to attend John Marshall Law School. After a stint with the U.S. Department of Health, he established the AIDS Legal Council (ALC) in 1988, a standalone agency offering legal services to HIV-affected individuals in Chicago.

By 1993, ALC had a team of eight members, with some stationed at Cook County Hospital to assist with patient benefits. Smith's efforts led to an increase in pro bono services from Chicago's legal community for HIV/AIDS legal cases.

Smith received the Maurice Weigle Award from the Chicago Bar Association. He wrote two textbooks on HIV/AIDS topics, including AIDS and Society in 1996, and taught related courses at institutions such as Loyola University Chicago School of Law and Northwestern University.
