= Heartland Alliance =

Anti-poverty organization based in Chicago

- Predecessor: Traveler’s and Immigrants Aid
- Formation: 1888
- Founder: Jane Addams
- Founded at: Chicago
- Type: 501(c)(3)
- Purpose: Anti-poverty Organization
- Headquarters: 208 S. LaSalle Street, Suite 1300; Chicago, IL 60604
- Key people: Alison W. McConnell (Chair), Susan Rider (Vice Chair), Shubha Ahya (Secretary), Cynthia Fronczak (Treasurer)
- Subsidiaries: Heartland Alliance International -- Europe UK, Heartland Alliance International -- Europe Belgium
- Affiliations: Alianza Heartland Mexico, Heartland Health Centers
- Revenue: $151,557,690 (2018)
- Staff: 1400+ (2018)
- Volunteers: 1200+ (2018)
- Website: https://www.heartlandalliance.org/

Heartland Alliance is an anti-poverty organization based in Chicago, with a historical focus on serving American immigrant communities. Heartland Alliance devotes the bulk of its funding to initiatives that address poverty through health and housing, with further programs centered on jobs, justice, and international work. Heartland Alliance's 72 programs are run by constituent companies Heartland International, Heartland Alliance Health, Inc., Heartland Alliance Housing, Inc., and Heartland Alliance Human Care Services. Heartland Alliance also includes a Policy & Advocacy Team, Social Impact Research Center, National Initiatives, and the National Immigrant Justice Center. As a 501(c)(3), Heartland does not endorse candidates for political office.

== Mission ==
Heartland Alliance's stated mission is to “advance the human rights and respond to the human needs of endangered populations—particularly the poor, the isolated, and the displaced—through the provision of comprehensive and respectful services and the promotion of permanent solutions leading to a more just global society.”

== History ==
=== 1888: Traveler’s and Immigrants Aid ===
Heartland Alliance, then known as Traveler's and Immigrants Aid, was formally founded in 1888 by progressive social reformer Jane Addams. Traveler's and Immigrants Aid grew from the Travelers Aid Movement, which has been deemed the oldest, non-sectarian social welfare movement in the United States. The first Travelers Aid program began in 1852 with the allocation of funds from former St. Louis mayor Bryan Mullanphy to the City of St. Louis for the purpose of assisting “bona fide travelers heading west.” Starting in the 1880s, with the urging of organizations such as the YWCA, Travelers Aid programs were founded in major US cities to provide protection for women and girls traveling alone. However, as the program entered the early 20th century, it began shifting its focus towards welcoming immigrants to the United States as well as providing aid to all people regardless of gender, age, class, race or religion.

=== 1890s-1980s: The shifting role of Heartland ===
Jane Addams’ Chicago-based Traveler's and Immigrants Aid organization was opened with the aim of providing immigrants to the United States with the resources needed to transition into their new lives.

Though Heartland Alliance's mission originally focused on providing support services for immigrants to the United States, the organization has gone on to provide healthcare, housing, and support to different vulnerable populations through the years.

For instance, at the turn of the 20th century, Heartland Alliance worked to reconnect family members who had been separated from one another as they were processed at Ellis Island, America's largest and most active immigration station at the time. Additionally, Heartland Alliance workers served as designated emergency first-responders for individuals and families in need of housing during the Great Depression. When veterans of the First and Second World War returned home from war, Heartland Alliance provided services to veterans and their families to increasing housing stability and counteract the risk of homelessness. Furthermore, in the 1980s, Heartland Alliance opened housing and healthcare clinics in response to the AIDS epidemic in Chicago.

=== 1987: Treatment of Survivors of Torture ===
In 1987, a group of physicians, psychologists, lawyers, and torture survivors came together to establish the Marjorie Kovler Center for the Treatment of Survivors of Torture in Chicago, the second ever torture survivors’ treatment center in the United States. The Marjorie Kovler Center is a division of Heartland Alliance International (HAI) providing mental health care, medical care, therapeutic services, case management, interpretation, and translation services for survivors of politically sanctioned torture committed abroad and their families.

In addition to providing direct services to those who have survived torture and their families, the Kovler Center provides local-level and international trainings on their community-based, trauma-informed model of treatment and advocates for the end of torture around the world.

The Heartland Alliance Marjorie Kovler Center is also a member center belonging to the National Consortium of Torture Treatment Programs. Employees from the Kovler Center have represented the United States before review of the UN Convention on Torture.

=== 2003-2025: transition into broader international trauma care work ===
In 2003, Heartland Alliance implemented its first international torture treatment and prevention programs in Iraq and Guatemala. Heartland Alliance International (HAI), the global arm of the Heartland Alliance's human rights program, was officially established as a subsidiary of Heartland Alliance in 2013. Today, the Heartland Alliance has offices in nearly a dozen countries responsible for human rights program implementation.

In 2007, Heartland Alliance also founded the Trauma Recovery and Training Center (TRTC). It has since become an independent Kurdish, non-governmental organization and taken on the name of "Wchan", meaning "rest" in Kurdish. This Kurdish-Iraqi independent, non-governmental non-profit is modeled after the Kovler Center trauma care institution in terms of its service provision model. Like the Kovler Center, this organization's main program works to rehabilitate survivors of human rights abuses through the provision of mental health, legal, medical, and case management services.

From 2008 to 2013, Heartland Alliance International collaborated with researchers from Johns Hopkins University on the first comprehensive mental health treatment trials in Iraq. From their exploration of three treatment approaches, they determined that the cognitive behavioral Common Elements Treatment Approach (CETA) demonstrated the most efficacy as a method for treating torture survivors. Wchan has since adopted CETA as its main course of treatment.

== Controversies ==
=== Abuse allegations ===
In 2015 the Illinois Department of Children and Family Services and the Chicago Police Department filed reports citing evidence of a sexual relationship between a staff member at Heartland Alliance's International Children's Crisis Center and a 17-year-old boy housed at the shelter. A federal lawsuit alleges negligence regarding a child in Heartland Alliance's care who fell into a metal bed frame and needed three staples in the head. A 2017 DCFS inspection complaint regarding Heartland's Rogers Park, Chicago shelter cited “improper and inadequate supervision” and fire code violations.

Heartland's Casa Guadalupe campus in Des Plaines, Illinois has multiple DCFS citations of employing staff members who lack the training to properly discipline children.

In 2017 an employee resigned from the Casa Guadalupe facility in response to a DCFS citation of her lack of qualifications.

In July 2018, the U.S. Department of Health and Human Services and the Illinois Department of Children and Family Services opened investigations of Heartland's Casa Guadalupe shelter. Four children reported forced labor, including scrubbing toilets with their bare hands. Other children housed in the facility reported being “roughly dragged off a soccer field,” and denied medical attention after breaking an arm. Four children reported an incident in which an unruly 5 year old was given injections, “after which the boy became sleepy.” Heartland Alliance conducted an internal investigation following three allegations of abuse at the Casa Guadalupe shelter and found no evidence to support these claims.

=== Runaway children ===
Since 2014, the Illinois Department of Children and Family Services and the Chicago Police report a total of ten runaways from Heartland facilities. In 2014, a child left the facility and roamed the neighborhood, calling for her mother. She was walked back to the shelter by a neighbor. Two girls ran away from Heartland's Bronzeville shelter while on a field trip to the Museum of Science and Industry in March 2016. After the incident, Heartland instituted new field trip policies for the Bronzeville facility that required staff members assigned to watch specific children, the attendance of a security worker, and a headcount of children every 15 minutes. A boy jumped a fence in April 2017, which Heartland responded to by writing up four employees for a lack of monitoring and a failure to adhere to procedure. Illinois DCFS noted that Heartland had failed to assign each employee a specific number of children to monitor while outside, despite Heartland's policy to do so.
