= Gay Chicago =

Former American LGBT news organization

- Publisher: Dane Tidwell
- First issue: 1976; 49 years ago
- Final issue: September 21, 2011; 13 years ago

Gay Chicago is a defunct LGBT online news organization in Chicago, Illinois, which ceased publishing in print form on September 21, 2011.

Gay Chicago replaced Gay Chicago Magazine which was founded in 1976 by Ralph Paul Gernhardt and published under the former Gernhardt Publications. It was a weekly LGBT news and entertainment publication. It started as a pocket-sized publication but in 1988 was enlarged to tabloid format. Gay Chicago News was also published in 1977. Craig Gernhardt holds all the archives of every edition since 1976, including over 200,000 photos of the LGBT community from 1976 to 2001, when digital became the wave of the future. Most of the archived rare photos have never been seen by the public.

Under the leadership of Ralph Paul Gernhardt, the former magazine sponsored the Gay Games and local gay sporting teams. On March 2, 2011, Gay Chicago Magazine reorganized as an Illinois not-for-profit corporation, Gay Chicago Foundation, and transitioned from an entertainment publication to the weekly newsmagazine Gay Chicago. The new publication was no longer published by the company founded by Ralph Paul Gernhardt.

In July 2011 Dane Tidwell took over as managing publisher, handling day-to-day operations. In August 2011 Tidwell purchased 50% shares in Gay Chicago for an undisclosed amount.

In mid-September 2011, Dane Tidwell announced that the magazine would become a biweekly, and on September 29, 2011, Craig Gernhardt announced it had suspended print publication altogether. With the halt of printing of Gay Chicago, the Windy City Times becomes Chicago's only LGBT newsweekly in print form.

Gay Chicago Magazine won several community leadership awards, including being inducted to the Chicago Gay and Lesbian Hall of Fame in 1991.
