= AIDS Foundation of Chicago =

Non-profit organization

- Abbreviation: AFC
- Headquarters: Chicago, IL
- President/CEO: John Peller
- Website: aidschicago.org

AIDS Foundation of Chicago is a locally based, non-profit organization that advocates for HIV/AIDS prevention as well as serves as a general resource for the HIV/AIDS community. Founded in 1985, some of their better-known accomplishments include hosting fundraisers to support the distribution of HIV/AIDS related medications in the city, funding the Open Door Health Center, and launching their “Getting to Zero” plan. Their cause seeks to increase the amount of resources available to the HIV/AIDS community as resources are too few and far between. Similar to other city organizations focused on sexual health such as Howard Brown Health, AFC makes getting access to treatment easier for all patients, decreases the stigma around treatment, and promotes the awareness and acceptance of those who live with HIV and/or AIDS.

== History ==
The AIDS Foundation of Chicago was founded in 1985. In 2012, the organization established community-based HIV testing and set up partnerships with medical homes to initiate care within 72 hours for individuals found to be HIV positive.

== Projects ==
=== Getting to Zero Illinois Plan ===
The AIDS Foundation Chicago, Chicago Department of Public Health, and Illinois Department of Public Health have come up with a five-year plan designed to reduce the transmission of HIV/AIDS while providing a continuum of needed health services. On May 14, 2019 Governor J. B. Pritzker announced the Getting to Zero Illinois initiative. The plan exponentially increases the number of health and public workforce to meet the constant challenges of those who are affected by HIV/AIDS. The increase workforce will target the hardest hit areas of Illinois that lack the resources to address HIV/AIDS. Improving communications between state health groups organizations and community groups allows for a continued focus on lowering the transmission of HIV/AIDS. Together the groups will monitor progress of their plan to end the HIV epidemic in Illinois.

=== Pride Action Tank ===
The Pride Action Tank is a project initiated by the AFC, in collaboration with Howard Brown Health. The purpose of the Pride Action Tank, is to provide resources to LGBTQ+ communities living within Chicago's Southside, who lack the resources necessary to fight HIV and AIDS.

=== AIDS Garden Chicago ===
The AIDS Garden Chicago is a series of public monuments located within a 2.5-acre area along Lake Michigan. The AIDS Garden Chicago is a collaboration effort between the AIDS Foundation of Chicago and the Chicago Park Foundation. This garden is meant to recognize and remember the progress made in the fight against HIV/AIDS as well as to commemorate and empower those who are still fighting the disease.

== Events ==
=== AIDS Run and Walk ===
The AIDS Run and Walk is an annual event that takes place at Soldier Field in Chicago with the overall goal of raising money for the AFC. This event takes place every fall and has raised over $100,000 in the past.

=== World of Chocolate ===
World of Chocolate is an annual event put on by the AFC. This event is put on in order to further advance efforts to end HIV/AIDS. – and to also advance efforts. This event takes place every December at Revel Fulton Market, in Chicago's West Loop area. World of Chocolate invites/encourages various restaurants, bakeries and other vendors in Chicago to attend this event. In previous years, the World of Chocolate event has raised over $200,000 from event sponsors, vendors and individual donors.

== Services ==
The AIDS Foundation of Chicago offers testing, financial assistance, medication, and housing. HIV, HCV and other types of STI testing are available through the AFC; along with HIV education for those who are diagnosed and in need of assistance handling their symptoms and diagnosis. Medication for those who are not diagnosed with HIV, but wish to prevent the infection is available as well; in the form of Pre-exposure prophylaxis, commonly referred to as PrEP. Financial Assistance for those with HIV or other disabilities is also offered, through case management. In the most extreme cases, the AFC also provides permanent and temporary housing to those who are homeless and diagnosed with HIV, AIDS, or another disability.

== Partners ==
The AFC was one of the founding organizations of the International Rectal Microbicide Advocates.

=== Sponsors ===
In 2021, the AFC received a $5,000 grant from Pfizer to support the foundation's Annual Advocacy Day.
