= Woodhull Freedom Foundation =

Non-profit organization advocating for sexual freedom

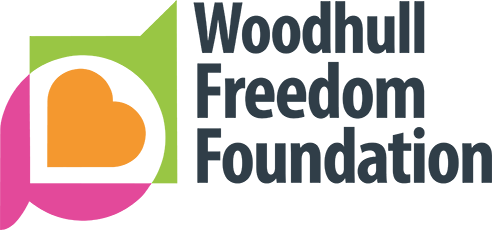
- Founded: February 2003
- Founder: Mary Frances Berry, Melinda Chateauvert, Richard O. Cunningham, Judy Guerin-Cunningham, Jeffrey Montgomery, and Ricci J. Levy.
- Type: 501(c)(3)
- Purpose: human rights sexual expression sexuality civil rights issues freedom of speech social and political change
- Location: Washington, D.C.
- Origins: Named after suffragist Victoria Woodhull
- Region served: United States
- Method: Research, advocacy, public education, social change
- Key people: Ricci J. Levy (President & CEO), Hardy Haberman (Board Chair)
- Website: http://www.woodhullfoundation.org

The Woodhull Freedom Foundation, also known as Woodhull Sexual Freedom Alliance, is an American non-profit organization founded in 2003 that advocates for sexual freedom as a fundamental human right. The organization is based in Washington, D.C., United States. Named after an influential member of the American woman's suffrage movement, Victoria Woodhull, its focus includes analyzing groups and individuals that seek to perpetuate a culture of sexual repression.

Sexual Freedom Day, officially recognized in 2011 in Washington, DC, and held every September 23, celebrates the birthday of Victoria Woodhull. The Woodhull Freedom Foundation (WFF) has held the Sexual Freedom Summit annually since 2010. Organization members have included LGBTQ activist Jeffrey Montgomery, former chairwoman of the United States Commission on Civil Rights Mary Frances Berry, writer Eric Rofes, lawyer Lawrence G. Walters, and activist Dan Massey.

In the furtherance of activities relating to its goals, the organization has allied itself with groups including the Foundation for Individual Rights and Expression, the National Gay and Lesbian Task Force, the American Civil Liberties Union, the Gay and Lesbian Activists Alliance, the Tully Center for Free Speech at Syracuse University, National Coalition Against Censorship, the Heartland Institute, National Association of Scholars, American Booksellers Foundation for Free Expression, Accuracy in Academia, and the American Council of Trustees and Alumni. An academic paper in the Journal of Homosexuality characterized the organization as one "that addresses both international and national sexual freedom issues as well as a host of other health and human rights issues."

== History ==
=== Foundation: 2003 ===
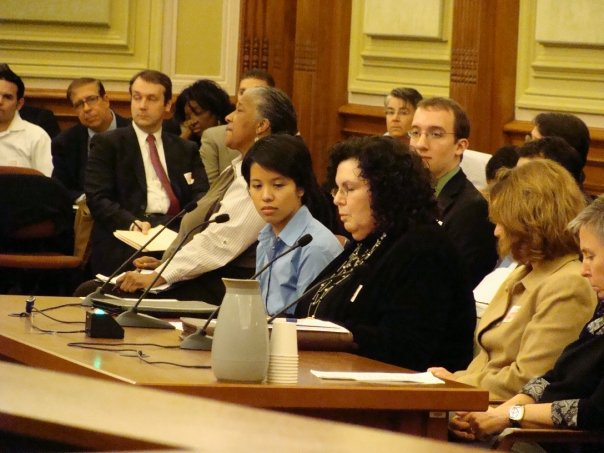
Executive Director of Woodhull Freedom Foundation, Ricci Levy, testifying in Washington, D.C. at a hearing on same-sex marriage on November 2, 2009 in front of the Council of the District of Columbia; Chair of the hearing was Commissioner Phil Mendelson.

The organization was founded in 2003 with the name Woodhull Freedom Foundation. It began with a focus on global and domestic human rights, specifically looking at sexual freedom. It is named for Victoria Woodhull (1838–1927), the first woman to own a company on Wall Street and to run for President of the United States. Its focus includes examining the stakeholders that maintain a climate of sexual repression.

The organization releases an annual report in September on "Sexual Freedom Day" called the "State of Sexual Freedom", which describes goals towards increasing sexual freedom. Woodhull's public relations representative Jeffrey Montgomery told the Washington Blade that their goals intersected with human rights: "Woodhull is the organization at the intersection of all sexual freedom issues because of the common core value of fundamental human rights. ... Without sexual freedom all personal freedoms are at risk." Woodhull tracks laws and regulations pertaining to sexual activity in the United States.

=== Early activities: 2004–2009 ===
In 2004, Woodhull joined with the National Gay and Lesbian Task Force in devoting resources towards analyzing old regulations used to harass LGBTQ people. The purpose of the study was to analyze existing regulations in the United States with regards to sexual activity, and simultaneously to foster ties between those against sexual repression and LGBT organizations. In 2005, Woodhull again coordinated with the National Gay and Lesbian Task Force in order to organize an event known as "Red, White and Leather for Independence Day", in which over 30 leather bars in 17 cities took part. Writer Eric Rofes served on the board of Woodhull before dying in 2006. In 2007, its Sexual Freedom Day was commemorated with a discussion group examining the idea of sexual freedom as a segment of human rights. Sexual Freedom Day took place in Philadelphia, Pennsylvania, as the first event of its kind on October 6, 2007 and included "a fund raiser featuring the Peek-a-Boo Revue and DJ Johanna Constantine and DJ Roots and Groove."

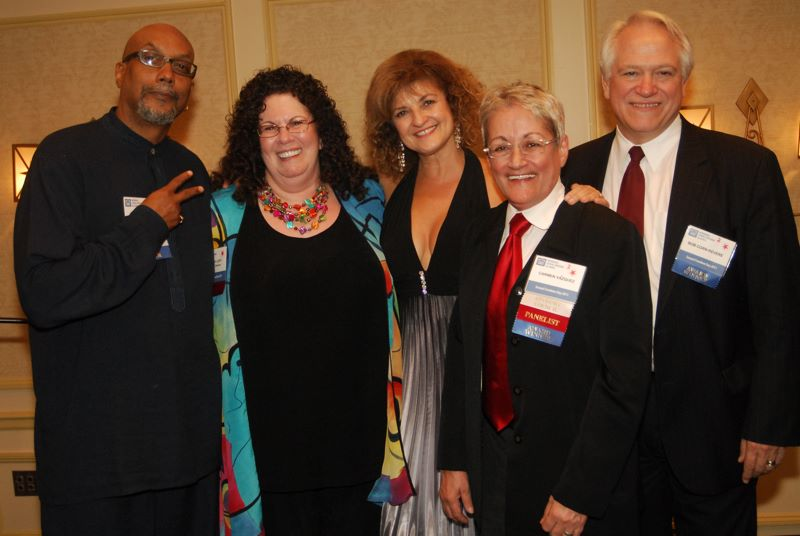
Left to Right, 2011 Vicki Sexual Freedom Award recipients, Ajamu Baraka, Ricci Levy, the Executive Director of Woodhull Freedom Foundation, Pamala Stanley, Carmen Vázquez and Robert Corn-Revere at the Vicki Award Ceremony on Sexual Freedom Day, 2011.

In July 2008, when the American Family Foundation called for a McDonald's boycott after the fast food restaurant said it would join the National Gay and Lesbian Chamber of Commerce, Woodhull's executive director announced a "buycott" asking those interested in supporting the restaurant to purchase additional meals. Woodhull joined with the American Civil Liberties Union and other groups in 2009 on an amici curiae brief before the U.S. Supreme Court in the case, Federal Communications Commission v. Fox Television Stations. On November 29, 2009, the Cleveland Leather Annual Weekend (CLAW) organized a leather dance reception in San Diego, California, so as to raise money for charitable purposes to assist the activities of Woodhull.

=== Recent work: 2010–present ===
The organization gave its 2010 Victoria Woodhull Sexual Freedom Award on September 23 of that year to Kushaba Moses Mworeko, an individual from Uganda who sought asylum in the United States due to his sexual orientation. Author Hardy Haberman was a board member of Woodhull in 2011. On November 17, 2011, Woodhull worked with the DC Trans Coalition, the Gay and Lesbian Activists Alliance, Gender Rights Maryland, Get Equal DC, Helping Individual Prostitutes Survive (HIPS), the Rainbow Response Coalition, and Transgender Health Empowerment to form a coalition sponsoring a "Transgender Day of Action" in Washington, D.C., that highlights examples of mistreatment of transgender people by law enforcement. The event served as a precursor to the Transgender Day of Remembrance which followed on November 20.

In January 2012, the organization joined with other groups including the Tully Center for Free Speech at Syracuse University, National Coalition Against Censorship, the Heartland Institute, National Association of Scholars, Alliance Defense Fund Center for Academic Freedom, Feminists for Free Expression, American Booksellers Foundation for Free Expression, Accuracy in Academia, and the American Council of Trustees and Alumni to send a letter asking the U.S. Department of Education's Office for Civil Rights to use the precedent of the 1999 Davis v. Monroe County Board of Education case to apply a definition of harassment for academic institutions (so as not to harm freedom of speech). In 2012, Buck Angel served on the organization's Board of Directors of the organization, and sexologist Megan Andelloux served as an advisory board member. Lawrence G. Walters was the general counsel for Woodhull in 2012.

On June 28, 2018, attorneys for Woodhull filed the first legal challenge to the unconstitutional SESTA/FOSTA legislation. According to Ricci Levy, President & CEO of Woodhull, "FOSTA chills sexual speech and harms sex workers. It makes it harder for people to take care of and protect themselves".

In August 2019, Woodhull's Sexual Freedom Summit celebrated its 10th anniversary.

== Reception ==
An academic paper by Susan Wright in the Journal of Homosexuality about those who faced discrimination due to sadomasochism (SM) described Woodhull as an organization "that addresses both international and national sexual freedom issues as well as a host of other health and human rights issues." Wright noted Woodhull dedicates its focus towards changing regulations and existing laws.

== Vicki Sexual Freedom Awards ==
2022

- Shanna Katz Kattarri
- Al Vernacchio

2020

- Cyndee Clay
- Joan Price

2019

- Kate Kendell
- Nadine Smith

2018

- Caroline Bettinger-López
- Mia Mingus

2017

- Willie J. Parker, MD, MPH, MSc
- Loretta J. Ross

2016

- Megan Andelloux
- Kenyon Farrow
- Carol Leigh
- Dr.Scout

2015

- John D'Emilio
- Diego Miguel Sanchez
- Monica Raye Simpson

2014

- Carol Queen
- Cory Silverberg
- Pam Spaulding

2013

- Nobel Peace Prize nominee Mandy Carter
- Heather Corinna
- Matt Foreman

2012

- Amber Hollibaugh
- Jeffrey Montgomery
- Dr. Esther Perel

2011

- Ajamu Baraka
- First Amendment attorney Robert (Bob) Corn-Revere
- Carmen Vasquez

2010

- Deborah Taj
- Bina Aspen
- Martine Rothblatt
- Kushaba "Moses" Mworenko
- Susan Wright

== See also ==
- Freedom of speech
- Fundamental rights
- Human rights
- National Coalition for Sexual Freedom
- Nitke v. Gonzales
- Sexual Freedom League
- Sexual repression
- US Human Rights Network
