= Matt Foreman =

Matt Foreman may refer to:

- Matthew Foreman, mathematician
- Matt Foreman (activist)
