= Mandy Carter (activist) =

American activist (born 1948)

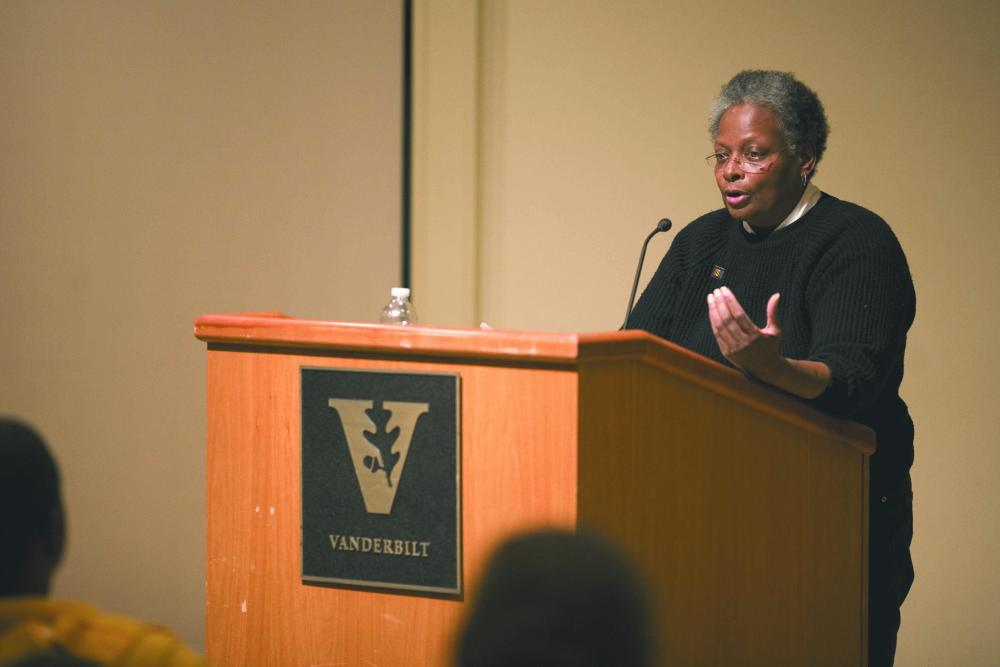
- Mandy Carter speaking at Vanderbilt University
- Born: November 2, 1948 (age 77); Albany, New York
- Citizenship: United States
- Education: Hudson Valley Community College
- Occupations: US lesbian, gay, bisexual and transgender (LGBT) activist
- Years active: 1968–present
- Political party: Democratic
- Movement: US LGBT

Mandy Carter is an American black lesbian, gay, bisexual and transgender (LGBT) activist.

== Career ==
Carter is a former executive director and one of the six co-founders of the North Carolina–based Southerners On New Ground (SONG). Founded at the 1993 National Gay and Lesbian Task Force's (NGLTF) Creating Change Conference in Durham, North Carolina, SONG integrates work against homophobia into freedom struggles in the South.

Carter served as campaign manager for North Carolina's Senate Vote '90 and Mobilization '96 political action committees. She served again as campaign manager for Florida Vote/Equal Voice based in Miami – a 2000 non-partisan, statewide voter empowerment campaign, which was initiated by the African-American Ministers Leadership Council of the People, People for the American Way Foundation, and the Florida NAACP – which resulted in one of Florida's largest black voter turn out's ever. Additionally, Carter was a four-year (1996-2000) North Carolina Member-At-Large of the Democratic National Committee (DNC), and a member of both the DNC Gay and Lesbian Caucus and the DNC Black Caucus. She was a delegate at the 2000 Democratic National Convention, as well as one of the four co-chairs for the daily meeting of the DNC Gay and Lesbian Caucus.

Together with Matt Foreman, then executive director of NGLTF, Carter was one of the two gay and lesbian people to speak at the 2003 Lincoln Memorial Rally for the 40th Anniversary of the 1963 March on Washington for Jobs and Freedom. SONG and NGLTF had been asked by the 40th Anniversary Steering Committee, which included Coretta Scott King and Martin Luther King III, to mobilize LGBT participation at the rally. They spoke at the event in honor of Bayard Rustin, the gay black activist who coordinated the 1963 march.

She was one of the five National Co-Chairs of Obama LGBT Pride, the LGBT grassroots infrastructure for Barack Obama's 2008 presidential campaign. She focused on organizing grassroots networks, especially people of color throughout the South.

Carter is a co-founder of the National Black Justice Coalition (NBJC), and is leading the organization's 2013 Bayard Rustin Commemoration Project. She sits on the boards and/or advisory committees of Durham's Ladyslipper Music, Equality Michigan, Vermont-based Kopkind Colony, and Woodhull Sexual Freedom Alliance.

In 2012, along with Chicana historian Elizabeth "Betita" Martinez and peace activist Matt Meyer, Carter co-edited We Have Not Been Moved: Resisting Racism and Militarism in 21st Century America, which Maya Angelou called "so needed...in this age and this climate of political posturing and posing."

== Honors ==
Carter was given the 2006 Spirit of Justice Award from Boston's Gay & Lesbian Advocates & Defenders (GLAD) for her work on LGBT civil rights in the United States. At the 2008 NGLTF's Creating Change Conference in Detroit she received the $10,000 Anderson Prize Foundation's Susan J. Hyde Longevity Award.

She was inducted into the International Federation of Black Prides' Black LGBT Hall of Fame during the January 2012 Martin Luther King Day holiday. Later that year she was named to the Campus Pride 2012 "Hot List" – chosen by students, campus professionals, and others involved in higher education. The list featured the top twenty-five LGBT related speakers, lecturers, and performers from around the country.

Carter was a 2013 recipient of Woodhull's "Vicki Sexual Freedom Award" recognizing her for her human rights work to secure and protect personal autonomy.
