= Campaign to Defend the Constitution =

Campaign to Defend the Constitution (DefCon) was an American online organization founded in September 2005 to support the separation of church and state and to oppose what it perceived as the growing influence of the religious right. It was a project of the Tides Center, a non-profit organization that funds progressive groups. However, its funding ran out in November 2007, at which time its blog announced the organization was "taking a break."

== Positions ==
DefCon described itself on its website as ...

... an online grassroots movement intending to combat the growing power of the religious right. We will fight for the separation of church and state, individual freedom, scientific progress, pluralism, and tolerance while respecting people of faith and their right to express their beliefs.

== Advisory board ==
The DefCon advisory board included Bruce Alberts, Francisco J. Ayala, Chip Berlet, Max Blumenthal, Erwin Chemerinsky, Frederick Clarkson, Matt Foreman, Steven Gey, Ira Glasser, Michelle Goldberg, Isaac Kramnick, Lawrence M. Krauss, James M. Lawson Jr., Kate Michelman, Harold Varmus, and Mel White.

== Campaigns ==
=== Left Behind: Eternal Forces Campaign ===
After Bible publishing company Tyndale House released the video game version of Tim LaHaye's's Left Behind called Left Behind: Eternal Forces, DefCon asked their members to send emails to Wal-Mart CEO Lee Scott to stop selling the game. Wal-Mart stated that it did not intend to comply with the request.

=== Stem cell research ===
During the stem cell campaign, DefCon ran two full page ads in The New York Times in May and June.

They also released a video on YouTube featuring DefCon advisory board member and former NARAL Pro-Choice America President Kate Michelman's personal views on stem cell research.

== Criticism ==
DefCon ran ads asserting the involvement of conservative political strategist Ralph Reed, evangelist Lou Sheldon, and Focus on the Family's James Dobson in the Jack Abramoff lobbying scandal. Dobson has denied any connection to Abramoff, and a DefCon spokesman has conceded that there was no proof of collusion between Dobson and Abramoff. In response to the ads, Dobson characterized DefCon as "a radical leftist organization," and stated:

Despite the viciousness of the DefCon attack, we are not vengeful or vindictive about it. Nor are we discouraged or depressed. It goes with the territory. Everyone who tries to defend righteousness in the culture is treated to something similar. Jesus told His followers to expect persecution, and therefore, it comes as no surprise that we have been subjected to it.

== "Taking a break" ==
The last blog post on the organization's website, made in November 2007, read:

We wanted to let you all know that this will be our last blog post, at least for now. Our funding has run out, so we will be taking a break. We want to make it clear that this is in no way an admission of defeat, we’ve had some spectacular successes and it is clear that the religious right is on the run! Thanks to all of you, we’ve been able to fight the teaching of creationism in public schools, fight for stem cell research, run national ads showing Jack Abramaoff’s ties to religious right leaders, and in general shed an important light on the hypocrisy of the religious right. We’re going to leave the thread open for a few weeks so that you all can make connections. We really value this community, and hope to reconnect with you all sometime in the future. Thank you for all you’ve done to help in the fight to defend our Constitution.

== See also ==
- Dominionism
- TheocracyWatch
- Americans United for Separation of Church and State
