= Daniel Massey =

Dan or Daniel Massey may refer to:

- Daniel Massey (manufacturer) (1798–1856), farm implement manufacturer
- Daniel Massey (actor) (1933–1998), British Canadian actor
- Dan Massey (1942–2013), American LGBT rights/sexual freedom activist
