= Lawrence Walters =

Lawrence Walters could refer to:

- Lawrence G. Walters (born 1963), American attorney and First Amendment activist
- Lawrence Richard Walters (1949–1993), American truck driver known as "Lawnchair Larry", who devised a temporary aircraft using a lawnchair and helium balloons
