= Howard Brown Health =

Non-profit organisation in the US

- Formation: 1974
- Headquarters: Chicago, Illinois, US
- Interim President and CEO: Robin Gay, DMD
- Chief Operating Officer: Steven Glass
- Chief Medical Officer: Patrick Gibbons, DO
- Website: howardbrown.org
- Formerly called: Howard Brown Health Center

Howard Brown Health is a nonprofit LGBTQ healthcare and social services provider that was founded in 1974. It is based in Chicago and was named after Howard Junior Brown.

== Mission ==
Howard Brown Health is an organization that focuses on providing health care for people within the lesbian, gay, bisexual, transgender, and queer (LGBTQ) community in several areas throughout the city of Chicago. They are one of the largest health care and research organizations primarily caring for the LGBTQ community in the United States. In addition to healthcare, they also provide a variety of services that include housing, jobs, food, education and more through the Broadway Youth Center and Brown Elephant Resale Shops, which Howard Brown owns.

The Broadway Youth Center helps LGBT youth who are experiencing homelessness or struggling with housing. In addition to providing medical services, the center offers a GED program; high school and college tutoring; assistance in applying for health insurance, food stamps, shelter and jobs; food, clothes and laundry services; refuge and other care to LGBTQ youth.

== History ==
=== 1970s–1990s ===
In 1974, a group of medical students from the Chicago Gay Medical Students Association founded Howard Brown Health Center in response to the rising rates of sexually transmitted diseases among gay men. In subsequent years, and with the advent of the AIDS crisis, Howard Brown developed services including primary medical care, mental health counselling, substance abuse services, prevention and education, research programs and case management. Howard Brown Health Center, named for Howard Junior Brown, was incorporated in 1976 as Howard Brown Memorial Clinic. In the late 1970s, a high rate of hepatitis B among the center's patients inspired Howard Brown to participate in important research studies and vaccine trials against the disease, leading to the first hepatitis B vaccine. Gaining international fame for its research into LGBT health issues, the Center went on to participate in the Multicenter AIDS Cohort Study, the longest running HIV study, resulting in breakthroughs in AIDS treatment and prevention.

Besides research, Howard Brown helped to set up the Chicago's first AIDS hotline in 1985. It was able to organize medical and psychosocial services to affected members of the community. The Howard Brown Health Center was inducted into the Chicago Gay and Lesbian Hall of Fame in 1991. It was recognized as "the Midwest's leading provider of support services to and for people living with AIDS and HIV disease, and an internationally recognized center for hepatitis and AIDS/HIV research." In 1997, a new facility on Sheridan Road was opened, which included a pharmacy that specialized in AIDS/HIV medications. In 2004 the Lesbian Community Cancer Project moved into this facility, and in 2007 the group merged with Howard Brown Health, becoming an agency project.

=== 2000s ===
In 2004, Howard Brown was administering HIV testing in China. Representatives were sent to look after patients within the Zhejiang Province on the southeaster coast for about two weeks at the bars and brothels. Similar to the other Howard Brown facilities, various health services were provided to patients in need.

In 2006, Howard Brown was selected to lead a joint effort to provide services for LGBTQ senior citizens. Funded by the National Gay and Lesbian Task Force (now the National LGBTQ Task Force), the initiative combined the resources of Rush University Medical Center, Heartland Alliance, the Council for Jewish Elderly (now CJE SeniorLife), and Midwest Hospice and Palliative Care to create a comprehensive program for seniors in the LGBTQ and disadvantaged communities.

=== 2010s ===
Howard Brown took part in the National Gay Blood Drive in 2014. This event was held to call on the federal government to lift the ban on gay men donating blood, while simultaneously promoting HIV screenings. This ban prevented a whole group of people who would be healthy enough to donate blood. The Food and Drug Administration (FDA) lifted the ban in 2015, with a new guideline that allowed gay men to only donate blood if they have not had sexual relations for a year or longer. The deferral period was further reduced in April 2020 from one year to three months, with FDA citing concerns with depleted medical supplies during the Covid-19 pandemic.

In 2015, the organization began to provide free legal services and advice once a week, along with the help of the Legal Assistance Foundation and the AIDS Legal Council of Chicago.

Howard Brown expanded its facility in Rogers Park, becoming the agency's sixth location in the summer of 2017. This establishment provided more amenities for the LGBTQ community with 12 exam rooms, large community space, and a clinic that would focus on sexual and reproductive issues. This expansion added 5000 new patients and created 19 full time jobs. To create this facility, Howard Brown Health purchased and renovated the new space with a $5 million loan from the IFF, as well as an $1.75 million from the same organization.

In the summer of 2019, Howard Brown Health opened the Broadway Youth Center that focused on helping young LGBTQ people who have experienced homelessness or housing instability. The center also includes a variety of services such as HIV testing, educational services, food, and behavioral health services.

In 2019, registered nurses at Howard Brown health voted to unionize with the Illinois Nurses Association. Beginning in 2021, non-nursing staff at the organization began organizing to join the union as well. In August of 2022, more than 470 employees voted to unionize. Workers described understaffing, a "toxic work culture," burnout, and retaliation from management as major reasons for the push to unionize. In January 2023, workers went on strike after 60 employees were laid off. A new contract was agreed upon and signed in May 2024.

In 2017, Panoptic Group, sold an abandoned apartment building in Lakeview that was in the process of being demolished and renovated to Howard Brown for about 3.2 million, with both agencies agreeing that Panoptic would complete the exterior of the new building, and Howard Brown would complete the interior. But Panoptic left their part unfinished with defects, which resulted in Howard Brown suing the company's principle, Bogdan Popvych, for $1.9 million in December 2018 and winning the suit. Howard Brown received a demolition permit for the incomplete building in July 2019 and finished the demolition in August of the same year. At this site, Howard Brown plans to build a 20,000-square-foot, five-story building that would hold youth programs and clinical services.

=== 2020 and future plans ===
With increasing demand of services, Howard Brown has made plans in early 2020 to continue the expansion of the organization in the North and South sides of Chicago by 2024. In the North side, there are plans to move the Broadway Youth Center to Lakeview and their Halsted clinic to a larger facility. In the South Side, new services will eventually be offered, along with the help from the non-profit organization Pride Action Tank. Howard Brown has also planned to look into more available locations within Bronzeville, South Shore, Chatham, and Roseland. With the lack of resources for the LGBTQ community in the South Side, neighborhoods have gotten $15 million from the state to fund the centers, and another $15 million previously set aside for other endeavors. Howard Brown's overall constructed plans would allow them to see 45,000 patients per year, an increase from the 30,000 patients among its current 11 locations. Howard Brown has been able to maintain a gross revenue of $137.5 million during their fiscal year by the end of 2019.

It is expected that Howard Brown would buy and occupy Little Jim’s Tavern, Boystown's oldest gay bar, by 2020. The owners of the Little Jim's Tavern listed their asking price at $7.5 million. This establishment would be able to contain about double the capacity of patients, while providing aid to an additional 2000 patients per year, in comparison to their current facility on Halsted. The potential new facility would take up about 30,000 square feet and would likely cost Howard Brown $30 million.

=== 2023-2024 financial instability, site closures, and 50th anniversary ===
At the advent of its 50th Anniversary, on July 1, 2024, Howard Brown issued a statement issuing a 7% position layoff for 43 positions. The press release issued by Dr. Robin Gay, interim CEO and President of Howard Brown, cites that this follows a critical need to address a $6.6 million budget gap in the 2023-2024 Fiscal Year. This news follows a press release earlier this year in May announcing the closure of the Howard Brown Health Center Locations: Diversey and 47th/Thresholds South scheduled to close on August 31, 2024 and September 30, 2024 respectively further citing the aforementioned $6.6 million budget gap as rationale.

This layoff is the second in the past 2 years with the first being announced publicly in a press release on January 2, 2023. This issue announced a 16% reduction in workforce to close a $12 million revenue shortfall. In August 2023, following union grievances and eight months of discussion Howard Brown Health followed guidance recommended by the National Labor Relations Board (NLRB) to reinstate the workers that were laid off with discussion of backpay pending. Announced on the Workforce Updates page on March 8, 2024, an evidentiary hearing is being held in October to determine if Howard Brown Health violated the National Labor Relations Act in its enactment of layoffs in January 2023.

== Locations ==
Howard Brown Health's main facility is in the Uptown neighborhood of Chicago, with one with the city's highest incidences of HIV/AIDS. Additional locations are in the Boystown, Englewood, Lakeview, and Rogers Park neighborhoods.

Youth aged 12–24 may access services at Howard Brown Health Center's Broadway Youth Center (BYC), located in Chicago's Boystown neighborhood.

Howard Brown Health operates three resale shops called The Brown Elephant in Chicago's Lakeview and Andersonville neighborhoods and in suburban Oak Park. The Andersonville location made it to the list of "10 Things to Do in Chicago" by Time magazine's City Guide.

== Financial controversy ==
In 2010, the National Institutes of Health (NIH) discovered that Howard Brown had mishandled $3 million in grant funds between 2006 and 2010. The NIH turned the issue over to the Department of Health and Human Services Office of the Inspector General. The grant funds were supposed to be used for HIV and AIDS studies, but the NIH found that Howard Brown was using the funds to pay for matters outside of the study, such as day to day expenses. As a result, Howard Brown had to turn over less than $1 million to Northwestern University who continued as the lead agent for the studies.

After the financial scandal, Howard Brown Health became financially unstable and launched a Lifeline Appeal with a goal of raising $500,000 in 50 days in order to keep its doors open. The fundraiser ended up raising $650,000 within the 50 days.

In 2012, Howard Brown Health agreed to repay multiple establishments after the financial scandal, including the federal government, the Health Resources and Services Administration, the Centers for Disease Control and Prevention (CDC), and the NIH.

== See also ==
- Howard Junior Brown
