= Kierra Johnson =

American LGBTQ rights activist

- Johnson in 2023
- Born: 1976 or 1977 (age 49–50); Valdosta, Georgia, U.S.
- Education: University of Colorado Boulder
- Occupation: Activist
- Employer: National LGBTQ Task Force
- Title: President

Kierra Johnson (born 1976 or 1977) is an American LGBTQ rights activist. She serves as president of the National LGBTQ Task Force, the first Black woman to head the organization.

== Early life and education ==
Johnson was born in Valdosta, Georgia. The daughter of an Air Force service member, she moved during her childhood to Atlanta and Colorado. She sang in the choir at the DeKalb School of the Arts of Avondale High School in Georgia, and continued to sing in a traveling choir after moving to Colorado.

At the University of Colorado Boulder, Johnson was elected student body president. She joined a competitive debate club, which helped hone her skill in public speaking. She joined the Black student union, and organized on issues including tuition, tenure and retention for faculty and students of color, and divestment from corporations. During her senior year in 1999, she co-coordinated Black Awareness Month.

== Career ==
Johnson became interested in activism for gender equity and reproductive rights when her sister became pregnant at the age of 16. Johnson would continue her activist work in these areas for 20 years. In 1999, she received training at the Gloria Steinem Leadership Institute, then began working for Choice USA the following year. She later became executive director of the organization, which was renamed to Unite for Reproductive & Gender Equity (URGE). She served as a delegate for Barack Obama at the 2008 Democratic National Convention.

In 2010, Johnson joined the board of directors of the National LGBTQ Task Force. In 2018, she became its deputy executive director. In 2020, Johnson was named as the next executive director of the organization, succeeding Rea Carey in February 2021 and becoming the first Black woman to head the organization.

== Honors and recognition ==
- 2023, 2024: 500 most influential people, Washingtonian magazine
- 2025: Out100, Out magazine
- 2025: Active Advocate award, BET
- 2026: Inaugural Stonewall Honoree, Stonewall National Museum and Archives

== Personal life ==
Johnson is bisexual and pansexual. She goes by she and they pronouns. She has three children.
