= Tantus =

American sex toy company

Tantus is a company that produces silicone sex toys, including vibrators, dildos, butt-plugs and strap-on harness kits. They are based in Sparks, Nevada, and are the largest producer of silicone sex toys in the United States. All of their product is made from high grade medical silicone which is considered to have safety and environmental benefits and is the main concept of their marketing. At ANME 2000 Tantus was the first company to introduce silicone toys to mainstream adult store buyers.

In 2018 Tantus received the President’s Award from the National Leather Association International.

Kris Victor and Metis Black co-founded Tantus in 1998. Metis Black became sole owner in 2008, at which time they broadened their offerings to include some of the first Silicone products for men, including the first silicone cockrings and slings.

Metis Black has gone on to write several articles on sexual health and plastics, and the chemistry of lubricants and has been featured on articles about green sex toys.

Black also served in several non-profits, including the former Center for Sex and Culture, and as a director of the Woodhull Sexual Freedom Alliance.

Tantus Inc was sold to a private equity firm in 2021.
