= Kimberley McLeod =

American writer and activist (born 1987)

Kimberley McLeod (born 1987) is an American writer, activist and businesswoman. She is best known as the creator of Elixher, a media platform and online magazine focused on Black LGBTQ women that operated 2011-2017.

== Life and career ==
McLeod began to identify as queer as a teenager. As an adult, she worked as a writer for outlets such as Essence and People, and worked at GLAAD.

She was inspired to create Elixher due to a lack of representation of Black LGBTQ women in mainstream media. McLeod launched the site in March 2011 as a WordPress blog, while she was also working as the Communications Director for the National Black Justice Coalition. The site grew followers and she brought on a team of contributors. A digital version of the website, Elixher Magazine, premiered in April 2013. As of August 2014, the magazine was released and available in print twice per year. Elixher ceased production of new content in 2017.

=== Accolades ===
2014 - 40 under 40, The Advocate
