= Carmen Vázquez =

American LGBT rights activist (1949–2021)

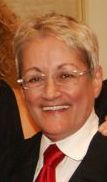
- Vázquez at the 2011 Vicki Sexual Freedom Award ceremony
- Born: January 13, 1949; Bayamón, Puerto Rico
- Died: January 27, 2021 (aged 72); New York City, New York
- Education: City University of New York
- Movement: LGBT rights movement, Immigrant Rights

Carmen Vázquez (January 13, 1949 – January 27, 2021) was an American activist, writer, and community intellectual.

== Early life and family ==
The oldest of seven children, Carmen Vázquez was born in Bayamón, Puerto Rico and raised in Harlem. She graduated from Cathedral High School in Manhattan. Attended the City University of New York, earning a bachelor's degree in English and a masters in education.

== Career and activism ==
After graduating, Vázquez moved to San Francisco where she lived and worked for almost two decades, becoming a leading activist in causes ranging from immigrant rights to lesbian health.

While in San Francisco, Vázquez co-founded The Women's Building, became the executive director of the National Network for Immigrant and Refugee Rights and then the Coordinator of Lesbian and Gay Health Services for the San Francisco Department of Public Health. She was also the co-founder and co-chair of Somos Hermanas, a Central American Women's Solidarity Network.

Vázquez returned to New York City in 1994 where she continued her activist work as Director of Public Policy for the LGBT Community Center (1994–2003), as deputy director for Empire State Pride Agenda (2003–2007) and in her post as Coordinator of the LGBT Health and Human Services Unit of the AIDS Institute, New York Department of Health.

She was the government and public policy director of the New York City LGBT Community Services Center, a founding member of the New York State LGBT Health and Human Services Network, a board member of the National Gay and Lesbian Task Force, a board member of the Funding Exchange's OUT Fund and a co-chair of Equality Federation from 2004 to 2006. She was a founder of Causes in Common, a national coalition of LGBT Liberation and Reproductive Justice Activists.

She was honored by CUNY School of Law with an honorary degree in 2004. Her essays have been published in several anthologies. Carmen served on the Advisory Council of the Woodhull Freedom Foundation since its founding in 2003 and served as the co-chairperson of the board of directors.

== Death ==
Vázquez died from COVID-19 related causes on January 27, 2021, during the COVID-19 pandemic in New York City.

== Writings and bibliography ==
Some of her work regarding liberation is published in conmoción, a Latina lesbian magazine created in part by tatiana de la tierra to build a platform for Latina lesbian conversation and visibility.
