= Empire State Pride Agenda =

U.S. LGBT political advocacy organization

- The Empire State Pride Agenda logo

- U.S. State of New York
- Founded: 1990
- Dissolved: December 13, 2015; 10 years ago
- Location: New York City, New York
- Region served: New York
- Key people: Nathan M. Schaefer, executive director

The Empire State Pride Agenda (ESPA) was a statewide political advocacy organization in New York that advocated for lesbian, gay, bisexual, and transgender (LGBTQ) rights, including same-sex marriage. ESPA has since disbanded after an executive order was passed by Governor Andrew Cuomo which protects the rights of transgender citizens as long as future governors uphold the law. ESPA was founded in 1990 through the merger of the New York State Gay and Lesbian Lobby and the Friends and Advocates for Individual Rights. ESPA was considered the leading gay political organization in the State of New York before it disbanded. As of 2005, ESPA was the largest statewide lesbian and gay political advocacy and civil rights organization in the United States.

ESPA played a leading role in the late 1980s and early 1990s, along with groups representing other minorities, in surveying and consulting on a new districting process for the City Council of New York City; according to some, these efforts resulted in the most diverse City Council since the 1930s. Dick Dadey served as first executive director from 1991 to 1997.

ESPA has been the driving force in negotiating New York City's comprehensive domestic partnership law, passing a statewide hate crimes law, repealing a 150-year-old consensual sodomy statute, and enacting local non-discrimination laws and policies in Buffalo, Ithaca, Nassau County, and Westchester County. Each year, ESPA outlines legislative, electoral and organizing priorities for the state.

In 2012, ESPA received press attention when, approaching the end of Ross D. Levi's second year as executive director, it assigned his duties to his deputy Lynn Faria pending a long-term replacement.

ESPA was a member of the Equality Federation.

== History ==
In June 1994, ESPA, along with the New York City chapter of the Gay and Lesbian Alliance Against Defamation, produced a full-page advertisement in The New York Times to counteract the "religious right" portrayal of us as "a scary specter"; more than 1,000 gay and lesbian New Yorkers came out about their non-heterosexuality.

In 1994, ESPA joined a network of liberal and progressive groups to counteract the "right-wing" Christian Right's "stealth strategy" to getting people elected to local school boards by "hiding their opposition to critical thinking, bilingual programs, multicultural education, and ultimately to public schooling itself". In 1996, ESPA joined the Freedom to Marry Coalition (Marriage Project). In 1997, ESPA helped educate advocates on how to push for hate-crimes legislation.

In 1998, ESPA launched "Pride in the Pulpit", a program to combat the use of religion to advance anti-LGBT amendments and legislation; in 2005, more than 450 non-LGBT religious leaders participated.

In 1999, ESPA Co-chair Jeff Soref was named a part of Out magazine's "Out 100" for his work with ESPA and his efforts to push for a rule change to provide gays and lesbians more representation at the 2000 convention of the Democratic National Committee. In the early 2000s, ESPA, together with a local Gay, Lesbian and Straight Education Network, convened the Dignity for All Students Coalition, bringing fifty community groups together to work on anti-bullying and anti-discrimination legislation.

ESPA was a strong advocate for a 2000 hate crimes law that provided enhanced criminal penalties for crimes motivated by hatred on the basis of sexual orientation.

In 2001 and 2002, ESPA worked to ensure that same-sex partners of September 11 attack victims received equal financial assistance, as many same-sex partners of those who perished in the attacks were initially denied any compensation. In October 2002, Governor George Pataki decreed that same-sex partners as well as unmarried partners of survivors would receive benefits equal to married partners, and on a national level, Senator Hillary Clinton called for coverage for those affected by the Pennsylvania and Washington, D.C. attacks. Three bills that passed in 2002—each of which was advocated by ESPA—provided various benefits and protections to the surviving same-sex partners of individuals who perished in the September 11 attacks.

In December 2001, ESPA executive director Matt Foreman was recognized by U.S. Representative Jerrold Nadler for his work with ESPA since 1997. Foreman served as executive director of ESPA from 1997 to 2003, when he departed to become executive director of the National Gay and Lesbian Task Force. In 2002, the New York State legislature passed Sexual Orientation Non-Discrimination Act (SONDA) with ESPA being the "major lobbying muscle". SONDA was criticized for not covering transgender individuals, but observers felt that the inclusion of gender identity as a protected category would make it impossible to pass the bill (which had first been introduced in 1971). In April 2004 Alan Van Capelle was named as the new executive director. SONDA was passed in December 2002, not covering transgender people but "laying the foundation for winning full equality" according to Foreman. In October 2003, Carmen Vázquez, formerly of LGBT Community Center of NYC, was appointed deputy executive director of ESPA.

In June 2004, the annual Equality at Work awards honoring companies and individuals that work to create an "inclusive workspace that respects, welcomes and supports LGBT professionals" were launched. The 2005 recipients were American Express, The Village Voice, Michael Fishman, president of 32BJ SEIU, and James Berg, president of the Realty Advisory Board on Labor Relations. The 2006 recipients were Merrill Lynch, Kodak, and Kym Ward Gaffney at Price Waterhouse Coopers.

ESPA helped pass an August 2004 law guaranteeing same-sex partners hospital visitation rights identical to those enjoyed by spouses and next-of-kin when caring for loved ones in hospitals and other facilities.

In October 2004, ESPA held its 13th Annual Fall Dinner with keynote speaker San Francisco mayor Gavin Newsom; the Fall Dinner benefited the Empire State Pride Agenda Foundation, which is the non-partisan, 501(c)(3) research, education and advocacy arm of the organization. The ESPA Foundation, in partnership with the New York State Lesbian, Gay, Bisexual and Transgender Health and Human Services Network, "developed and utilized education, advocacy and community organizing strategies to overcome the barriers of political and cultural opposition, inadequate knowledge about the health care needs of the community, and heterocentric models of healthcare" to obtain governmental health and wellness funds targeted for LGBT health needs. The effort resulted in $10.7 million in state funding for non-HIV/AIDS LGBT service needs, including primary care, preventative health needs, crime victim assistance, and support services for the state and for youth, seniors and people of color.

In 2005, ESPA helped to pass legislation providing same-sex partners the same authority as spouses when making decisions regarding the burial of a deceased partner.

In October 2005, ESPA joined the Lambda Legal Defense Fund and a coalition of anti-censorship groups to oppose a new zoning law that would shut down an estimated 149 adult-oriented bookstores, theaters and clubs including all of the businesses on Christopher Street.

In 2007, same-sex marriage legislation passed the New York State Assembly by a vote of 85–61. ESPA has been a leading supporter of same-sex marriage legislation in New York.

In 2008, the ESPA-supported Gender Expression Nondiscrimination Act passed the New York State Assembly for the first time.

On December 2, 2009, ESPA-supported same-sex marriage legislation failed in the New York State Senate by a vote of 24–38.

On May 14, 2010, a New York Times blog reported that ESPA was "poised to select" Brian Ellner as its next executive director. It was later reported that Ellner's past affiliation with Michael Bloomberg had been criticized by some ESPA supporters; for whatever reason, he withdrew his name from consideration, and on the 22nd ESPA instead announced appointing Ross D. Levi, an attorney, to the position. Levi had been a legislative assistant at the New York State Legislature starting in 1997 and part of ESPA's Albany staff since before 2000, and since 2006 had held its title as Director of Public Policy & Education.

On July 2, another reporter reported (on the same NYT blog) Ellner's appointment to head the "Campaign for New York Marriage", financed by Human Rights Campaign.

On April 20, 2011, New Yorkers United for Marriage was instituted as an alliance among ESPA, Marriage Equality New York, the Human Rights Campaign, and Freedom to Marry.

A March 6, 2012, report stated that Levi had been "fired" the preceding day. The Times credited that as the first report, and suggested that ESPA board members felt Human Rights Campaign's work under Ellner had caught attention to the detriment of ESPA's role.

On December 12, 2015, ESPA announced that it would be disbanding over the course of the first half of the next year, citing the "fulfillment of a 25-year campaign for equality."

== Same-sex marriage lobbying ==
At the ESPA Fall Dinner held on October 22, 2009, then-Executive Director Alan Van Capelle publicly expressed great frustration that state senators supported by the group—some of whom Van Capelle mentioned by name—had not yet passed legislation on same-sex marriage. At a "couldn't-be-higher stakes" November 2010 meeting with Governor David Paterson and other elected officials who supported the same-sex marriage bill, Senate Democratic Leader John Sampson and Senator Jeff Klein "did not mince words in letting Van Capelle know they were upset by" his critical comments at the Fall Dinner.

ESPA was regarded as the driving force behind a failed December 2009 Senate vote on same-sex marriage legislation. In late 2010, Governor David Paterson was asked what would have to occur in order for same-sex marriage to be legalized in New York. Paterson responded, "Get rid of the lobbyists," and added that same-sex marriage lobbyists had "literally forced" a Senate vote prematurely in December 2009.

== See also ==
- LGBT culture in New York City
- LGBT rights in New York
- LGBT history in New York
- Same-sex marriage in New York
- List of LGBT rights organizations

== Bibliography ==
- Anner, John, Beyond Identity Politics: Emerging Social Justice Movements in Communities of Color, South End Press, 1996, ISBN 0-89608-533-3, ISBN 978-0-89608-533-6.
- Bailey, Robert W., Gay Politics, Urban Politics: Identity and Economics in the Urban Setting, Columbia University Press, 1999, ISBN 0-231-09662-3, ISBN 978-0-231-09662-1.
- Buchanan, Angela Marie and Bay Buchanan, The extreme makeover of Hillary (Rodham) Clinton, Regnery Publishing, 2007, ISBN 1-59698-507-0, ISBN 978-1-59698-507-0.
- Crotty, William J., The politics of terror: the U.S. response to 9/11, UPNE, 2004, ISBN 1-55553-577-1, ISBN 978-1-55553-577-3.
- During, Simon, The Cultural Studies Reader, Psychology Press, 1999, ISBN 0-415-13754-3, ISBN 978-0-415-13754-6.
- Healy, Sheila A., "Advocating for Health and Human Services: The New York Experience", Handbook of LGBT Issues in Community Mental Health, Volume 8, Issues 3–4 of Journal of Gay & Lesbian Psychotherapy, Psychology Press, 2005, ISBN 0-7890-2310-5, ISBN 978-0-7890-2310-0.
- Hellman, Ronald E. and Jack Drescher, Handbook of LGBT Issues in Community Mental Health, Volume 8, Issues 3–4 of Journal of Gay & Lesbian Psychotherapy, Psychology Press, 2005, ISBN 0-7890-2310-5, ISBN 978-0-7890-2310-0.
- Lewin, Ellen, Recognizing Ourselves: Ceremonies of Lesbian and Gay Commitment, Columbia University Press, 1999, ISBN 0-231-10393-X, 9780231103930.
- Mucciaroni, Gary, Same sex, different politics: success and failure in the struggles over gay rights, University of Chicago Press, 2008, ISBN 0-226-54409-5, ISBN 978-0-226-54409-0.
- Muscio, Inga, Cunt: a declaration of independence, Live Girls, Seal Press, 2002, ISBN 1-58005-075-1, ISBN 978-1-58005-075-3.
- Pinello, Daniel R., "America's Struggle for Same-Sex Marriage", Cambridge University Press, 2006, ISBN 0-521-84856-3, ISBN 978-0-521-84856-5.
- Perrotti, Jeff, Kim Westheimer, When the Drama Club is Not Enough: Lessons from the Safe Schools Program for Gay and Lesbian Students, Beacon Press, 2002, ISBN 0-8070-3131-3, ISBN 978-0-8070-3131-5.
- Stryker, Sheldon, Timothy Joseph Owens, Robert W. White, Self, Identity, and Social Movements: Volume 13 of Social movements, protest, and contention, U of Minnesota Press, 2000, ISBN 0-8166-3407-6, ISBN 978-0-8166-3407-1.
- Swan, Wallace, Handbook of gay, lesbian, bisexual and transgender administration and policy, CRC Press, 2004, ISBN 0-8247-4791-7, ISBN 978-0-8247-4791-6.
- Sycamore, Matt Bernstein, That's Revolting!: Queer Strategies for Resisting Assimilation, Soft Skull Press, 2004, ISBN 1-932360-56-5, ISBN 978-1-932360-56-1.
