= Baseball metaphors for sex =

"First base", etc., as a sexual euphemism

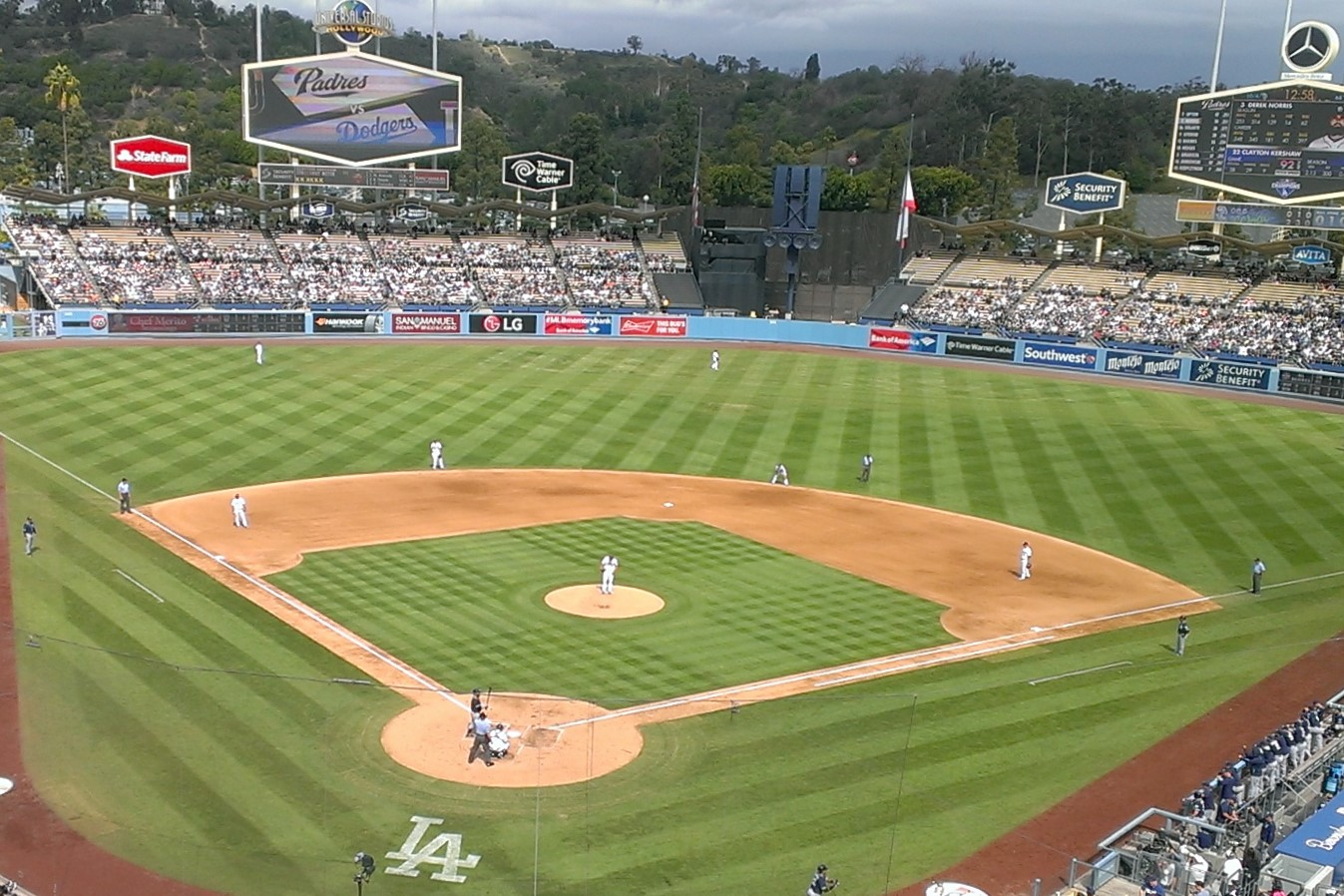
Baseball diamond showing all the bases

In American slang, various baseball terms are often used as euphemisms or metaphors for sex, especially to describe the degree of physical intimacy achieved. In the most common metaphor, first prevalent in the aftermath of World War II, sexual activities are described as if they are actions in a game of baseball. Baseball has also served as the context for other metaphors about sexual roles and identity.

== Running the bases ==
Among the most common metaphors is the progress of a batter and base-runner in describing levels of physical intimacy, traditionally from a heterosexual perspective. Definitions vary, but the following are typical usages of the terms.

- First base – mouth-to-mouth kissing, especially French kissing

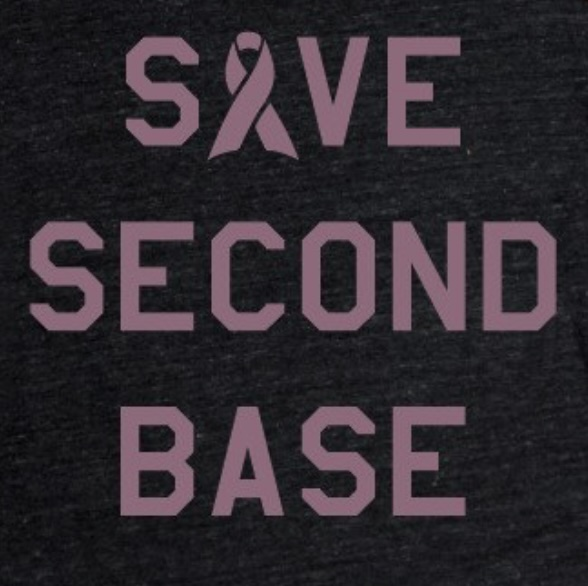
"Save second base" inscription on a breast cancer awareness t-shirt

- Second base – touching or petting above the waist, particularly touching the breasts or chest; in some contexts, it may instead refer to touching any erogenous zones through the clothes (i.e., not actually touching the skin)
- Third base – touching below the waist or manual stimulation of the genitals; in some contexts, it may instead refer to oral stimulation of the genitals;
- Home run (home base or scoring) – "full" (penetrative) sexual intercourse

The metaphors are found variously in popular American culture, with one well-known example in the Meat Loaf song "Paradise by the Dashboard Light", which describes a young couple "making out", with a voice-over commentary of a portion of a baseball game as a metaphor for the couple's activities. A similar example can be found in Billy Joel's song "Zanzibar" in which he compares himself to Pete Rose and sings the lines, "Me, I'm trying just to get to second base and I'd steal it if she only gave the sign. She's gonna give the go-ahead; the inning isn't over yet for me." Trace Adkins's 2006 song "Swing" is based on the same concept, while the protagonist in Brad Paisley's 2007 song "Online" is described as having never been to second base with a woman.

As of 2026, a wide variety of t-shirts and other garments are for sale that display a pink ribbon symbol supporting breast cancer awareness along with the text "save second base".

The term strikeout may be used to refer to a failure to engage in any form of foreplay or other sexual activity.

== Other metaphors ==
Baseball positions are used as a coded reference to the roles played by men who have sex with men:

- Pitcher – the penetrative partner in anal sex
- Catcher – the receptive partner in anal sex

Similar metaphors for sexual identity include:

- Switch hitter – a bisexual individual, referencing a player who can bat from either side
- Playing for the other team, also batting for the other team – indicating a person is gay or lesbian
- Playing for both teams, also batting for both teams – indicating a person is bisexual

== Views ==
The sequence of "running the bases" is often regarded as a sexual script, or pattern, for young people who are experimenting with sexual relationships. The script may have slightly changed since the 1960s. In their 1995 book, James Kohl and Robert T. Francoeur write that with the growing emphasis in the 1990s on safe sex to expand sex beyond heterosexual penetrative intercourse, the "home run" has taken on the additional dimension of oral sex. Researchers Juliet Richters and Christopher Rissel conversely state that "third base" is now sometimes considered to comprise oral sex as part of the accepted pattern of activities, as a precursor to "full" (i.e. penetrative) sex.

There are conflicting perspectives on the use of the baseball metaphor as a part of sex education. Some educators have found the baseball metaphor an effective instructional tool when providing sex education to middle school students. Opponents argue that the baseball metaphor reflects ideas about sex as a contest to be won, rather than a mutual and consensual activity. In her 1991 book The Power of Language: Baseball as a Sexual Metaphor in American Culture, Deborah Roffman writes that the baseball metaphor has been "insidiously powerful, singularly effective, and very efficient...as a vehicle for transmitting and transferring to successive generations of young people all that is wrong and unhealthy about American sexual attitudes." Critics suggest that other metaphors might be more useful for explaining sexual consent and pleasure; sexuality educator Al Vernacchio suggests "sharing a pizza" as an alternative metaphor that emphasizes mutual appetite and enjoyment over completion.

== See also ==
- Glossary of English-language idioms derived from baseball
