= Rea Carey =

American LGBT rights activist

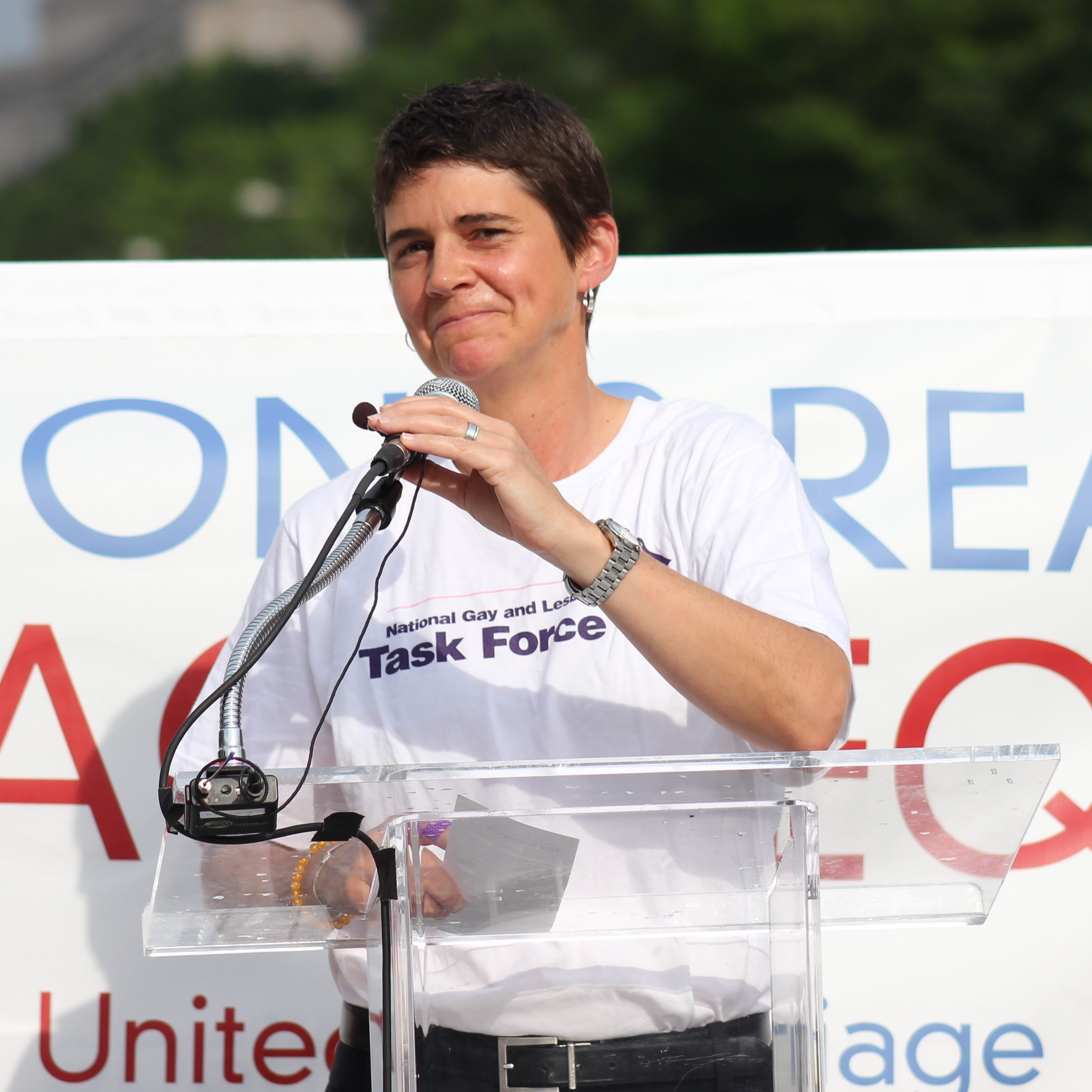
- Carey speaking at the 2013 Decision Day Marriage Equality rally in Freedom Plaza
- Born: December 22, 1966 (age 59)
- Education: Smith College (1980s); Harvard University
- Title: Executive director
- Predecessor: Matt Foreman
- Movement: LGBT rights movement
- Spouse: Margaret Conway
- Children: 1

Rea Carey (born December 22, 1966) is an American LGBTQ rights activist who served as the executive director of the National LGBTQ Task Force (previously the National Gay and Lesbian Task Force) from 2008 to 2021. She previously served as the organization's deputy executive director and was the founding executive director of the National Youth Advocacy Coalition.

== Life ==
Carey grew up in Denver, Colorado, and came out at the age of 16, near the start of the HIV/AIDS epidemic in the United States, which prompted her early activism.

Carey graduated from Smith College in the 1980s and holds a Master of Public Administration degree from the John F. Kennedy School of Government at Harvard University.

She lives in Washington, D.C., with her wife, Margaret Conway, and daughter.

== Career ==
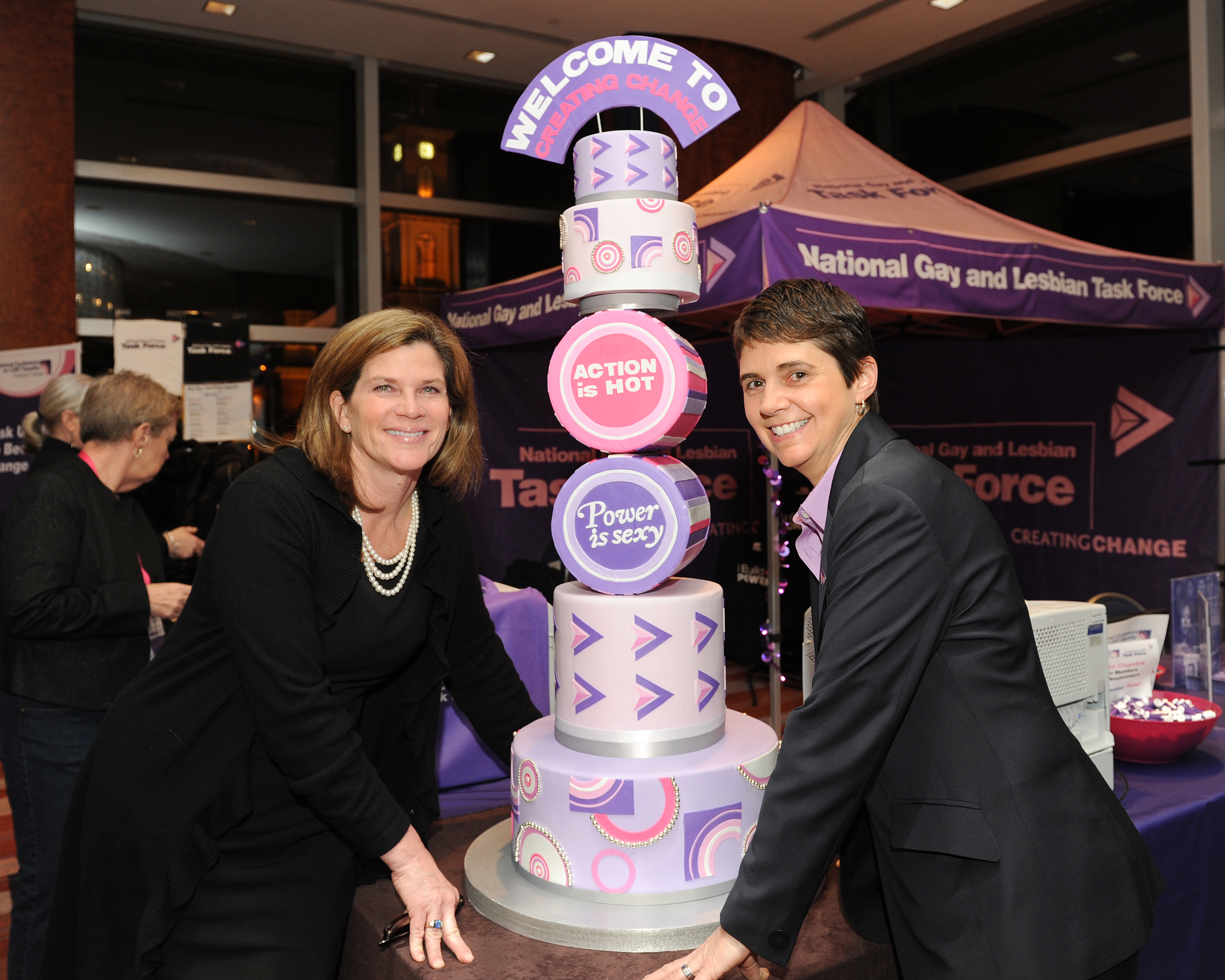
Rea Carey with First Lady of Maryland Katie O'Malley at the 2012 Conference on LGBT Equality in Baltimore, Maryland

Carey began her career working in HIV/AIDS prevention and in the LGBTQ community as one of the co-founders of Gay Men and Lesbians Opposing Violence and the founding executive director of the National Youth Advocacy Coalition. She also has served on the advisory boards for such publications as Teen People magazine and the Georgetown University Journal of Gender and the Law.

In 1999, The Advocate named Carey one of its "Best and Brightest" for individual contributions to the LGBT rights movement.

Carey joined the National Gay and Lesbian Task Force in 2004 as deputy executive director, and served as executive director from 2008 to 2021.

She was one of 105 women arrested in 2013 during an act of civil disobedience designed to pressure the United States House of Representatives to act on comprehensive immigration reform.

Carey served on the advisory board of the LGBTQ Policy Journal of the Harvard Kennedy School.

== See also ==
- National Gay and Lesbian Task Force
