= Robert Carter (priest) =

American Catholic priest (1927–2010)

The Reverend Dr Robert Carter SJ
- Born: Robert Earl Carter; July 27, 1927; Chicago, Illinois, U.S.
- Died: February 22, 2010 (aged 82); The Bronx, New York City, U.S.
- Occupation: Catholic priest
- Known for: LGBT rights activism, one of the first Roman Catholic priests in the United States to declare himself gay
- Parent(s): Earl and Ila Grace Smith Carter

Robert Earl Carter (July 27, 1927 – February 22, 2010) was an American Catholic priest and LGBT rights activist.

== Early life ==
Carter was born in Chicago, Illinois on July 27, 1927, the son of Earl and Ila Grace Smith Carter. The Carters were Protestants who worshiped in different traditions. Carter grew up in Lakewood, Ohio, and later Park Ridge, Illinois.

== Career ==
Carter graduated from the University of Chicago in June 1946 and the next day was received into the Catholic Church as a convert. He entered the Society of Jesus in 1954 and was subsequently ordained as a Roman Catholic priest in 1963. He became a scholar on John Chrysostom.

Carter was gay, and became one of the first Roman Catholic priests in the United States to acknowledge this publicly after he became one of the founders of the National Gay Task Force in 1973 (later the National Gay and Lesbian Task Force).

== Death ==
Carter died on February 22, 2010, at his residence at Fordham University in The Bronx, New York City.
