= National Black Justice Coalition =

Civil rights group serving the black LGBT community in America

- National Black Justice Coalition logo
- Founded: December 8, 2003
- Tax ID no.: 20-0667808
- Purpose: Black LGBTQ people
- Location: Washington, D.C., United States
- Region served: United States
- Services: Campaigning, advocacy, education
- Key people: Sharon Lettman-Hicks, executive director
- Revenue: US$911,451 (FY 2012)
- Website: www.nbjc.org

The National Black Justice Coalition (NBJC) is an American civil rights organization serving primarily Black lesbian, gay, bisexual, and transgender (LGBTQ) people. Since 2003, NBJC has collaborated with national civil rights groups and LGBT organizations, advocating for the unique challenges and needs of the African American LGBT community in the United States.

== Activities ==
In 2011, the organization identified the issues it would focus its programming efforts on:

- Employment Non-Discrimination Act (ENDA)
- Marriage equality
- Bullying in schools
- Don't Ask, Don't Tell
- Historically black colleges and universities (HBCUs)
- HIV/AIDS

=== Bayard Rustin 2013 Commemoration Project ===
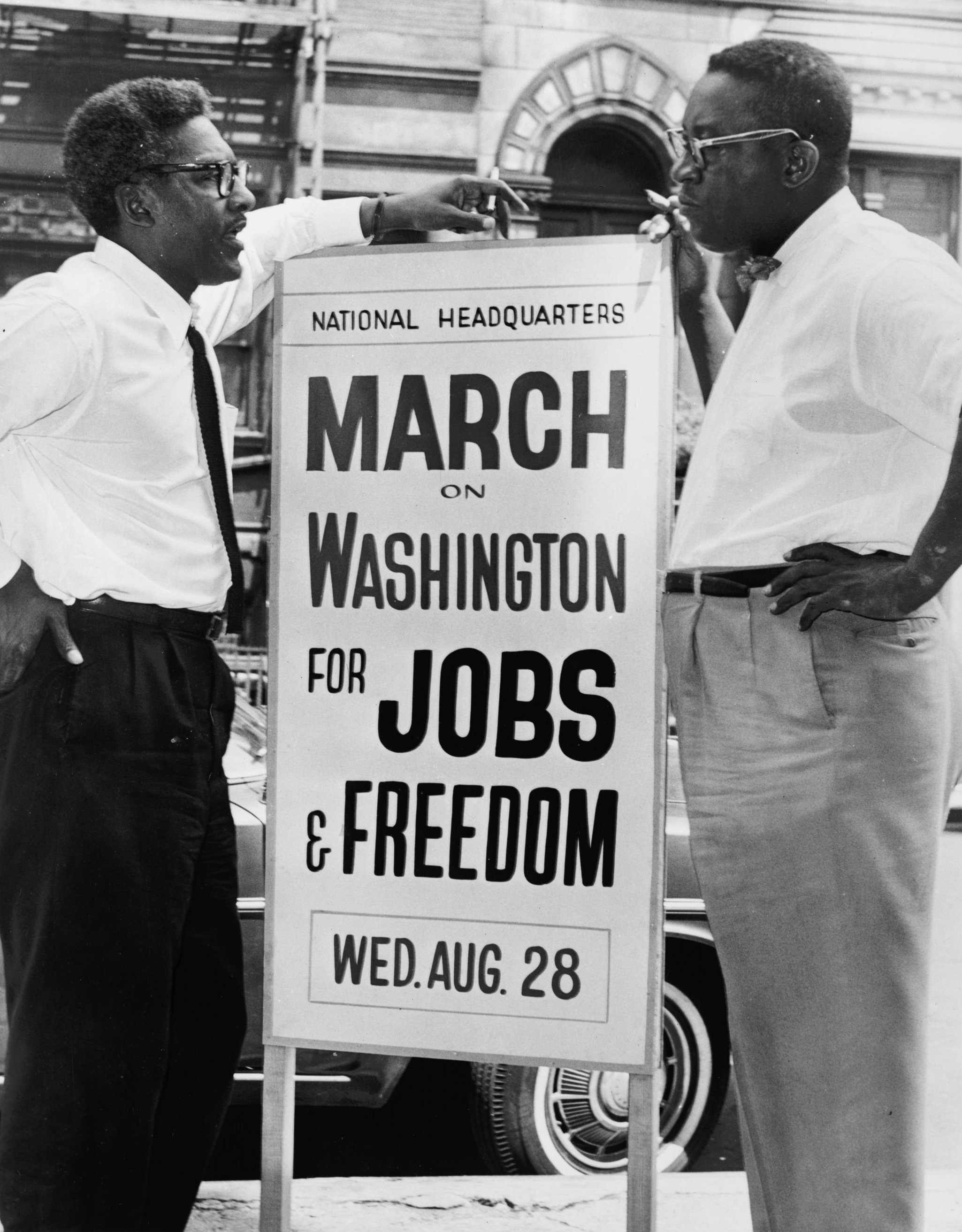
Bayard Rustin (left) outside the March on Washington for Jobs and Freedom headquarters in Washington, D.C.

On the 50th anniversary of the 1963 March on Washington for Jobs and Freedom, the organization honored the legacy of the march's chief organizer, openly gay civil rights leader Bayard Rustin. In addition to organizing the 1963 march, Rustin was also known for mentoring Martin Luther King Jr., and helping to form the Southern Christian Leadership Conference (SCLC).

Led by NBJC co-founder and political activist Mandy Carter, the initiative includes ongoing collaborations with Walter Naegle, Rustin's surviving partner as well as the executor and archivist of Bayard Rustin's estate. The organization also works with Nancy Kates and Bennett Singer, co-producers and co-directors of Brother Outsider: The Life of Bayard Rustin, a biographical documentary about Rustin.

=== Black Church Summit ===
In 2006, the organization held its first Black Church Summit in Atlanta, Georgia. During the first summit, the Rev. Al Sharpton denounced homophobia and called for greater inclusion of LGBT people.

=== Black, Trans and Proud ===
Black, Trans & Proud, a campaign promoting trans visibility and raising consciousness in the black community, was launched in honor of Transgender Awareness Week. The project called for community members to submit their photos and testimonials about their pride in the black trans community. As part of the campaign, NBJC featured ads with transgender leaders, including Kye Allums, Rev. Carmarion Anderson, Kylar Broadus, Laverne Cox, Janet Mock, Monica Roberts, and Valerie Spencer.

=== Emerging Leaders Initiative ===
This program identifies young activists (ages 18–30) in the black LGBT movement, and provides opportunities for young leaders to build networks and take action in their communities. The organization hosted the 2013 Black LGBT Emerging Leaders Day in conjunction with the Human Rights Campaign and the National Gay and Lesbian Task Force on February 21, 2013, in Washington, D.C.

=== Many Faces. One Dream. ===
"Many Faces. One Dream." is a series of LGBT economic conferences for LGBT communities of color co-hosted by NBJC and the U.S. Small Business Administration. The events began in early 2013 and will eventually travel to 13 major cities throughout the country that have a significant LGBT presence in communities of color, including Atlanta, Chicago, Detroit, Ft. Lauderdale/Miami, Houston, Indianapolis, Los Angeles, New Orleans, New York City, Newark, New Jersey, Oakland/San Francisco, Philadelphia and Washington, D.C.

Participants are grouped into two tracks: "Starting Your Business" and "Taking Your Business to the Next Level". In the first track, training is provided on business plans, loans, marketing, and SBA's program and services. The second track is designed for LGBT firms that are currently in business, with a desire to expand and grow.

=== OUT on the HIll ===
Attendees – black LGBT activists, allies, elected officials, faith leaders and youth – discuss and implement strategies to educate federal lawmakers about public policies impacting the black LGBT community.

=== #whatablacklesbianlookslike ===
After the Lieutenant Governor of Florida, Jennifer Carroll, avoided answering questions about an alleged same-sex encounter with a female subordinate by telling a local news outlet that black lesbian and bisexual women "don’t look like her" in the summer of 2012, NBJC launched a campaign with the Twitter hashtag #whatablacklesbianlookslike. After more than a week of pressure from groups like NBJC, Equality Florida and GLAAD, Carroll finally apologized, calling her comments "wrong and inexcusable" in a letter to Equality Florida's executive director Nadine Smith.

== History ==
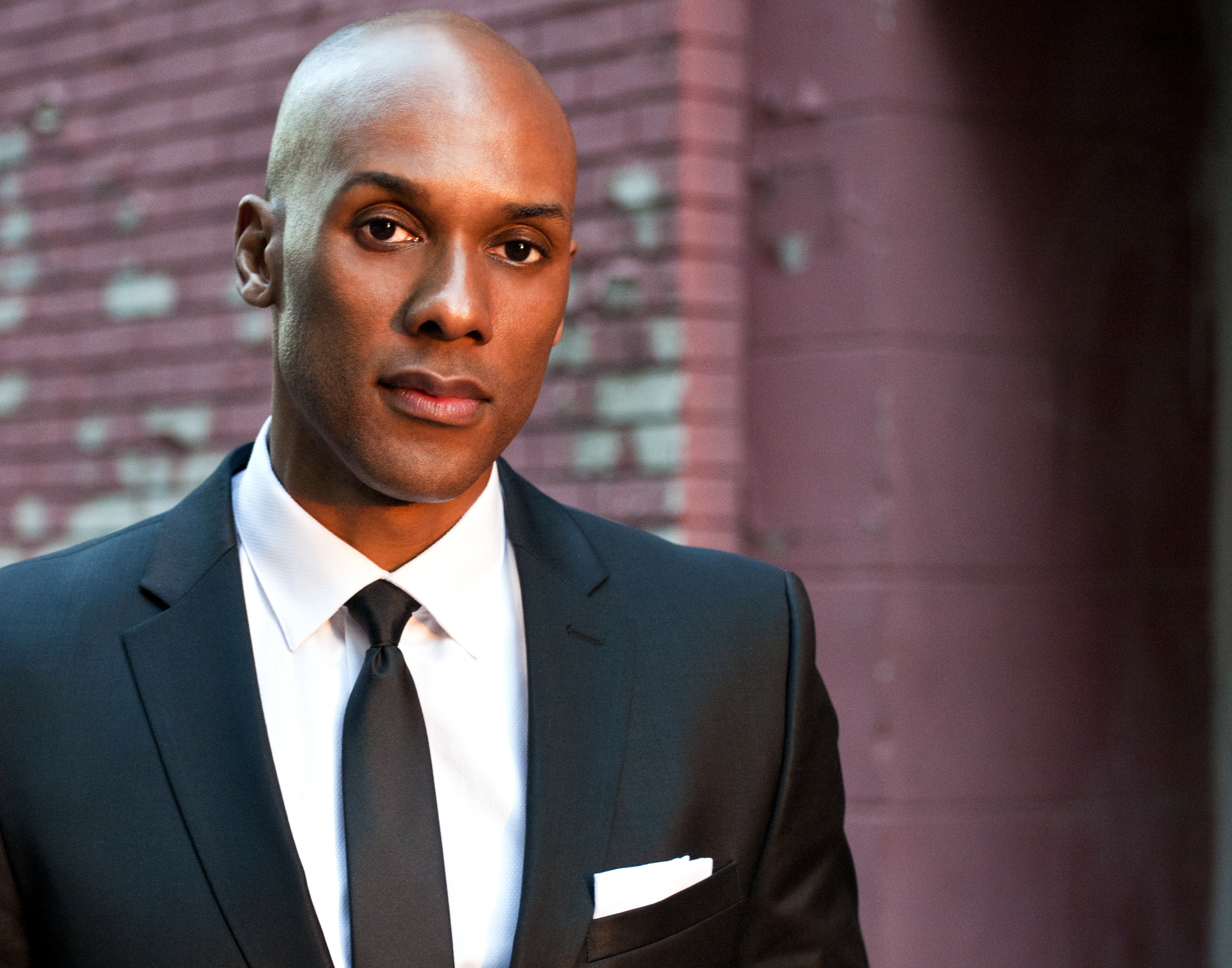
NBJC was co-founded by activist, author, and commentator Keith Boykin.

NBJC was founded on December 8, 2003, by a group of eight black civil rights leaders – Keith Boykin, Mandy Carter, Jasmyne Cannick, Donna Payne, Frank Leon Roberts, Sonya Shields, Roddrick Colvin, and Maurice Franklin. The formation of the organization was announced during a press conference held at the National Press Club in Washington, D.C. Initially the group came together to challenge support from African American religious and civil rights leaders for Republican-led efforts to amend the U.S. Constitution to prohibit same-sex marriage. Instead, the group began raising money to place advertisements promoting same-sex marriage in the African American media. Within three years, the group had created an organization and employed a staff led by founding executive director H. Alexander Robinson.

In July 2009, the organization became the first black LGBT group to address the National Association for the Advancement of Colored People (NAACP) board of governors when its deputy executive director, Jason W. Bartlett, urged the NAACP to pass resolutions issues pertaining to LGBT people of color.

In October 2009, it was announced that Sharon Lettman-Hicks would join the organization as executive director. She had previously worked at People for the American Way as executive vice president of leadership programs and external affairs.

== See also ==
- LGBT rights in the United States
- List of LGBT rights organizations
