= Howard Junior Brown =

- Born: April 15, 1924; Peoria, Illinois
- Died: February 1, 1975 (aged 50); New York, New York
- Education: Western Reserve University School of Medicine
- Occupation: Physician

Howard Brown (April 15, 1924 – February 1, 1975) was a founder of the National Gay Task Force (now the National Gay and Lesbian Task Force) and a New York City Health Services Administrator who helped change the image of gay men and lesbians in the United States by coming out publicly in 1973.

== Background ==
Born in Peoria, Illinois, on April 15, 1924, to a civil engineer, Howard Junior Brown spent his childhood in several small towns in Ohio. At the age of eighteen, he realized that he was gay when he became attracted to another student at Hiram College in Ohio. He sought psychiatric assistance from the head of the psychiatry department at Western Reserve University School of Medicine in Cleveland.

Drafted into the Army during World War II, Brown served as a medical corpsman before being discharged in 1944. He earned a medical degree from Western Reserve in 1948, but believed that he would always be a second-rate physician because of the common psychiatric teaching that homosexuals were inherently impaired. After years spent struggling with his sexuality, Brown quit analysis in 1954 and moved to New York City.

== Life in New York ==
Brown gained notice as the director of the Gouverneur Ambulatory Care Unit on Manhattan's Lower East Side. As Gouverneur director, Brown instituted several policies that were ahead of their time in a clinic most of whose patients lived in poverty. For example, he ensured the waiting rooms were comfortable and that, rather than waiting for hours, patients could make appointments just as patients could in more affluent neighborhoods. And when he learned that Puerto Rican women often failed to show up for their Ob/Gyn appointments because their husbands resisted their being examined by male doctors, Brown sought out female Ob/Gyn physicians to serve these patients.

On June 1, 1966, Brown became the first head of the New York City Health Services Administration. Mayor John Lindsay, elected in 1966, reorganized much of city government into “superagencies,” bringing the Health Department, Department of Hospitals, the Community Mental Health Board, and the city Medical Examiner's Office under the aegis of a single Health Services Administration. He oversaw 22 municipal hospitals, 23 district health centers, 94 child health stations, and 50,000 city employees but still needed to hide his sexual identity to keep his job.

In late 1967, Brown received a warning that an investigative reporter planned to expose homosexuals in the administration of Mayor John Lindsay and resigned rather than be forced out. The article never ran and Brown stayed closeted. He found work as a visiting associate professor of community medicine at the Albert Einstein College in The Bronx and served as the director of community medicine at two Bronx hospitals. In 1970, he joined the faculties of the Graduate School of Public Administration and the School of Medicine at New York University.

== Coming out ==
By this time, Brown had taken an apartment in Greenwich Village just a few blocks from the Stonewall Inn, and he witnessed the beginnings of the gay rights movement. As gay service organizations and gay churches rose in number, Brown lost his sense of shame about being gay and became increasingly angry about the routine insults directed at men like him. To show that even members of a profession regarded as a citadel of respectability could be homosexuals, Brown decided to make a public announcement about his sexuality. A publicist for the Gay Activists Alliance sent out a press release alerting the media to the story. On October 3, 1973, Brown came out at a symposium on sexuality at the Carrier Clinic in Belle Meade, New Jersey, and immediately became a media sensation. His announcement made the front page of the New York Times and received coverage by every television station in New York City.

Capitalizing on the publicity, Brown helped found the National Gay Task Force (NGTF) on October 16, 1973. His bad experiences with psychiatry, shared by many other gay men and lesbians, prompted the NGTF to challenge the American Psychiatric Association's classification of homosexuality as a mental disorder, a battle that was ultimately successful.

== Death ==
Brown's tenure as a gay activist proved brief. Plagued by coronary disease, he suffered a second heart attack on February 1, 1975, and died at his home in New York at the age of fifty. His estate published his autobiography, Familiar Faces, Hidden Lives, a book that also contains anecdotal stories of discrimination experienced by other gay men throughout America.

In 1973, most Americans commonly viewed gay men as effeminate narcissists too disturbed to be respectable members of society. Brown helped change that image. The discovery that a distinguished public figure, the very epitome of respectability as a physician, could also be a homosexual gave the cause of gay liberation a tremendous boost.

In 1974, an alternative health center, specializing in sexually transmitted diseases, and catering to gay men and lesbians, was opened in Chicago as the Howard Brown Memorial Clinic (now known as Howard Brown Health Center). It has since become the premier Midwest health center specializing in the medical and psychosocial needs of the lesbian, gay, bisexual, and transgender community.

== Bibliography ==
- Brown, Howard. Familiar Faces, Hidden Lives: The Story of Homosexual Men in America Today. New York: Harcourt Brace Jovanovich, 1976.
- Thompson, Mark, ed. Long Road to Freedom: The Advocate History of the Gay and Lesbian Movement. New York: St. Martin's Press, 1994.
- Neumann, Caryn E. "Brown, Howard. Ed. Claude J. Summers. glbtq: An Encyclopedia of Gay, Lesbian, Bisexual, Transgender, and Queer Culture 2004.
