= Lorri Jean =

Lorri Jean after a speech at the University of Nevada, Reno

Lorri L. Jean (born c. 1957) is an LGBT rights activist and the former CEO of the Los Angeles LGBT Center (LALGBTC).

Jean spent ten years as an attorney with the Federal Emergency Management Agency (FEMA), including three years overseeing the disaster response and recovery operations of its largest region. While at FEMA Jean authored a landmark study of why there is even a need for attorneys in the field of disaster relief. Jean holds a Juris Doctor degree from Georgetown University in Washington, DC, and a Bachelor of Science degree in communication from Arizona State University.

In 1993, Jean became CEO of what was then known as the Los Angeles Gay and Lesbian Center (LAGLC), serving for six years. After leaving the LAGLC, she served as executive director of the National Gay and Lesbian Task Force for two years. She later returned to the LAGLC and was renamed CEO. The LAGLC changed its name to the Los Angeles LGBT Center on May 27, 2014.

In 2007, she was ranked 27th in Out Magazine's "50 Most Powerful Gay Men and Women in America".
