= Virginia Apuzzo =

American gay rights and AIDS activist (born 1941)

- Born: June 26, 1941 (age 85); The Bronx in New York City, US
- Education: State University of New York at New Paltz (BS); Fordham University (MS)
- Known for: Gay rights and AIDS activism

Virginia "Ginny" Apuzzo (born June 26, 1941) is an American gay rights and AIDS activist. She is a former executive director of the National LGBTQ Task Force. She served as executive deputy of the New York State Consumer Protection Board and as the vice chair of the New York State AIDS Advisory Council. She was also President of the New York State Civil Service Commission and Commissioner of the New York State Department of Civil Service. In 1996, she became the Associate Deputy Secretary of Labor at the United States Department of Labor, and in 1997 she became the Assistant to the President for Management and Administration under the Clinton administration. In 2007, she began serving on the Commission on Public Integrity, where she worked until her retirement.

== Early life and education ==
Virginia Apuzzo was born in the Bronx in New York City on June 26, 1941. Her parents were both working-class Italians; her father owned a gas station and her mother worked at various times as a waitress, factory worker, and salesperson. She grew up in Riverdale, Bronx.

Apuzzo attended Catholic high school. She enrolled at the State University of New York at New Paltz, and graduated in 1963 with a Bachelor of Science in History and Education. In the 1960s, she became a teacher and chair of the Social Studies Department at the Marlboro Central School District in Marlboro, New York.

When Apuzzo was 26, she became a nun at the Sisters of Charity, a convent in the Bronx. By this time, she knew she was a lesbian. She later recounted her experience, saying "I tried to play by the rules. I thought I'd have to live my life with this deep dark secret." She also said, "I stayed [at the convent for] three years searching for answers to fundamental questions... I thought of my religious life as temporary. I didn't know whether it would take one year or twenty years to explore the morality of my homosexual identity." She continued to teach during her time at the convent, both at Cathedral High School in Manhattan and at the College of Mount Saint Vincent in the Riverdale neighborhood of the Bronx. Apuzzo left the convent in 1969, days after the Stonewall riots. She began teaching education at Brooklyn College of the City University of New York. She was later awarded tenure, and continued teaching there until 1986.

== Political career and activism ==
During the 1970s, Apuzzo became a member of the Coordinating Committee of the Manhattan Women's Political Caucus. In 1973 she earned a Master of Science in Urban Education from Fordham University, and began studying towards her Doctor of Education in the same subject the next year. In 1978 she co-founded the Lambda Independent Democrats. That same year she tried to get elected to the New York State Assembly but was unsuccessful. By 1979, Apuzzo took a leave of absence from Brooklyn College to serve as the assistant commissioner for operations in the New York City Department of Health. During her time at the Department of Health, she became a strong advocate for people with AIDS. She created a telephone hotline to educate and provide resources about AIDS, and she testified at the first congressional hearing on AIDS where she criticized the government, saying the response to the virus was insufficient.

During the late 1970s and early 1980s, Apuzzo became a frequent lecturer on civil rights at schools including Yale, Harvard, Princeton, and Columbia. She also was a guest on television shows including Nightline, The MacNeil-Lehrer Report, CBS Morning News, 20/20, and the Phil Donahue Show.

Apuzzo joined the National LGBTQ Task Force (then called the National Gay Task Force), and went on to serve as executive director from 1983 to 1985. In 1980 she became a delegate to the Democratic National Convention when she co-authored the first gay and lesbian civil rights portion of the Democratic party platform. She was one of few openly gay delegates at that time. She and her partner joined the Women's Caucus, a branch of the National LGBTQ Task Force. They began to work towards lesbian rights, challenging popular feminists who they felt were not accepting of lesbians within the feminist movement.

In 1984, New York Governor Mario Cuomo appointed Apuzzo to a panel investigating potential discrimination against gay people with regards to state employment, services, and benefits. In 1985 he made Apuzzo executive deputy of the New York State Consumer Protection Board (where she served until 1989) and the vice chair of the New York State AIDS Advisory Council (where she served until 1996). During this time she confronted pharmaceutical companies over the increasing costs of AIDS medication, began investigations into products that were fraudulently marketed as AIDS cures, and worked to draft new insurance policies.

In 1988, Apuzzo was awarded an honorary Doctor of Law by Queens College, City University of New York.

Apuzzo served as the President of the New York State Civil Service Commission and as Commissioner of the New York State Department of Civil Service before becoming the Associate Deputy Secretary of Labor at the United States Department of Labor in 1996. In 1997, President Bill Clinton appointed Apuzzo as Assistant to the President for Management and Administration. This made her the most senior openly gay person in the Clinton administration.

In 2005, she was one of the founders of the Hudson Valley LGBTQ Community Center which opened in 2007 in Kingston, New York.

In 2007, the Governor of New York Eliot Spitzer appointed Apuzzo to the Commission on Public Integrity. She worked in this role until her retirement.
