= New Yorkers United for Marriage =

LGBT rights umbrella group in New York

New Yorkers United for Marriage is an LGBT rights umbrella group in the US State of New York, formed on April 20, 2011, in order to coordinate and organize the push for the legalization of same-sex marriage within the state. Participating groups in the coalition include Empire State Pride Agenda, Marriage Equality New York, as well as the New York State chapters of Freedom to Marry, Human Rights Campaign, GLAAD, the League of Women Voters, and the Log Cabin Republicans.
