= Bruce Voeller =

American biologist (1934–1994)

Bruce Raymond Voeller
- Born: May 12, 1934; Minneapolis, Minnesota
- Died: February 13, 1994 (age 59); Topanga, California
- Occupations: Biologist, LGBTQ activist
- Years active: 1970s-1994

Bruce Raymond Voeller (May 12, 1934 – February 13, 1994) was a biologist and researcher, primarily in the field of AIDS, and gay rights activist. In 1973 he co-founded the National Gay Task Force. In 1977, the now renamed National LGBTQ Task Force held the first-ever meeting at the White House with President Jimmy Carter marking the first time openly gay and lesbian leaders were welcomed there, and the first official discussion of gay and lesbian rights in the White House. Within the first few years of the AIDS pandemic Voeller coined the term acquired immune deficiency syndrome (AIDS) which we use to this day.

== Early life and education ==
Voeller was born in Minneapolis and raised in Oregon. When he was at school, he was assured by a school counselor that he was not homosexual, even though he had felt such feelings very early on.

Voeller graduated with a bachelor's degree from Reed College in 1956. He was awarded a five-year fellowship to the Rockefeller Institute, and earned a Ph.D. in biology in 1961.

== Career ==
Voeller became an associate professor at the Rockefeller Institute in 1966. His research interest was in the fields of phytocytology and plant physiology. He wrote four books while there, as well as editing others' work, and writing numerous papers and articles. He married Kytja Scott Voeller, whom he met at graduate school, and they had three children.

He came out at the age of 29, and divorced from his wife in 1971. After becoming president of the New York Gay Activists Alliance, he decided it was not wide enough in its coverage. Therefore, with some friends, he founded the National Gay Task Force in October 1973, and was its director until 1978. The Task Force established affiliations with more than 2000 gay groups, and by 1978 had over 10,000 members. In 1977, the National Gay Task Force (now the National LGBTQ Task Force) successfully initiated the first-ever meeting between the White House and more than a dozen gay and lesbian leaders. President Jimmy Carter’s assistant, Midge Costanza, met with Task Force co-chairs and board members as well as representatives of gay and lesbian organizations for a briefing on critical policy issues affecting this constituency. The meeting marked the first time openly gay and lesbian leaders were welcomed at the White House and the first official discussion of gay and lesbian rights in the White House. Attendees at the White House meeting included: Frank Kameny, Myra Keddell, Charles Brydon, Ray Hartman, Betty Powell, William Kelley, Troy Perry, Jean O'Leary, Elaine Noble, George Raya and Pokey Anderson. He also founded the Mariposa Foundation, which specializes in sex research, and sexually transmitted diseases.

In 1973, Bruce Voeller, as president of the Gay Activists Alliance, complained to Jack Paar and ABC about remarks and terminology that the organization regarded as derogatory toward gay people. Paar subsequently invited Voeller and fellow GAA members Arnie Kantrowitz and Nathalie Rockhill to appear on the March 8 broadcast of Jack Paar Tonite. The discussion became contentious as Paar defended some of his language and views about homosexuality, while the activists challenged anti-gay terminology and stereotypes.

In the early 1980s, AIDS was known by various names, including GRIDD (Gay Related Immune Defense Disorder). Because this term was inaccurate, Voeller coined the term acquired immune deficiency syndrome. His partner was Richard Lucik, who was also his associate at Mariposa. Voeller died in 1994 of an AIDS related illness in California, at the age of 59.

In June 2019, Voeller was one of the inaugural fifty American “pioneers, trailblazers, and heroes” inducted on the National LGBTQ Wall of Honor within the Stonewall National Monument (SNM) in New York City’s Stonewall Inn. The SNM is the first U.S. national monument dedicated to LGBTQ rights and history, while The Wall's unveiling was timed to take place during the 50th anniversary of the Stonewall riots.
