= Al Vernacchio =

American sexuality educator

Al Vernacchio (born 1963 or 1964) is an American sexuality educator. Based in Pennsylvania, he teaches English and comprehensive sex education at Friends' Central School. He is also the assistant director of the Office of Diversity, Equity, & Justice at Friends' Central. In addition to his work at Friends' Central, Vernacchio has spoken about human sexuality at universities and in TED and TEDx talks. In 2014, he published the book For Goodness Sex; it was republished in 2023.

== Early life and education ==
Vernacchio was raised in a Roman Catholic Italian-American family, living in a small rowhome in South Philadelphia, Pennsylvania. He attended St. Joseph's Preparatory School, graduating in 1982. At an early age, Vernacchio knew he was gay. When he was 19 years old, he came out to his parents, who asked him to speak with a priest. Vernacchio cites his parents' unwillingness to talk about sexuality as part of his motivation for openly discussing the subject.

In 1986, Vernacchio graduated from Saint Joseph's University with a degree in theology. He received his master's of science in education in 1993, studying human sexuality education at the University of Pennsylvania.

== Career ==
While earning his master's degree, Vernacchio taught English and religious studies (including sex education) at St. Joseph's Preparatory School. Vernacchio was laid off from St. Joseph's Preparatory School in 1993.

From 1994 to 1998, Vernacchio worked in HIV/AIDS advocacy at ActionAIDS as a volunteer coordinator. After working at ActionAIDS, he remained a volunteer there and for AIDS Fund, including raising awareness at Friends' Central School and bringing students to volunteer. In 2014, Vernacchio was honored with the Founders' Award by the Philadelphia organization AIDS Fund.

In 1998, Vernacchio began working as an English teacher at Friends' Central School, a Quaker school in Wynnewood, Pennsylvania. Three years after he began teaching at Friends' Central, Vernacchio began teaching "Sexuality and Society" after proposing the senior-year elective course to school administrators. Vernacchio teaches comprehensive sex education. In addition to being the Coordinator of Gender, Sexuality, and Consent Education at Friends' Central, he also teaches English in the upper school and is assistant director of the Office of Diversity, Equity, & Justice. Vernacchio is also the faculty advisor for the gay–straight alliance at Friends' Central. Vernacchio also speaks about human sexuality at universities. He is a member of the Society for the Scientific Study of Sexuality; the American Association of Sexuality Educators, Counselors and Therapists; and Advanced Sexuality Educators and Trainers.

Vernacchio received greater attention in 2011, when he was profiled in a cover story for The New York Times Magazine. In 2012, he gave his first TED Talk. In 2014, Vernacchio released his book For Goodness Sex: Changing the Way We Talk to Teens About Sexuality, Values, and Health, published by Harper Wave. The book was received positively by reviewers. It was republished in 2023 by Harper Paperbacks with the subtitle A Sex-Positive Guide to Raising Healthy, Empowered Teens.

In 2021, Friends' Central received a $250,000 grant from the Edward E. Ford Foundation for a program titled "Healthy Relationships and Consent Education", led by Vernacchio. In 2022, the Woodhull Freedom Foundation named Vernacchio as one of its Vicki Sexual Freedom Award honorees.

=== Pizza metaphor ===
Vernacchio is known for proposing "eating pizza" as an alternative to the traditional baseball metaphor for sex. Writing about the pizza metaphor, he states:

Unlike baseball, whose schedule and rules are dictated from the outside, you have pizza when you want pizza. You eat it because you're in the mood for it. It starts with an internal sense, an internal desire, or a need. "Huh, I could go for some pizza!" The decision to act on the impulse rests with you—you are in control. I can recognize that I'm hungry but know that it’s not a great time to eat. That ability to make a deliberate decision about our desire is a huge factor in developing healthy sexuality.

Additionally, Vernacchio states that the pizza metaphor reframes sexual encounters to focus on mutual satisfaction, rather than a competition with winners and losers. He also uses the metaphor to discuss negotiation in sexual encounters: "when you talk about sharing a pizza, you talk about desires and choices. You talk about the things that you both want, and you work together to make the best decision for both parties." Before settling on the pizza metaphor, he considered an ice cream sundae upon the suggestion of a high school student.

== Personal life ==
Around 2013, Vernacchio converted from Catholicism to Quakerism. He lives in Germantown, Philadelphia, with his husband.
