= Accuracy in Academia =

American think tank and organization

Coordinates: 38.9850°N 77.0888°W

- Abbreviation: AIA
- Formation: 1985
- Headquarters: Bethesda, Maryland, United States
- Key people: Malcolm Kline; Daniel J. Flynn; Reed Irvine
- Revenue: $91,600 (2016)
- Expenses: $116,112 (2016)
- Website: www.academia.org

Accuracy in Academia (AIA) is an American organization that seeks to counter what it sees as liberal bias in education.

== Mission ==
AIA describes itself as a nonprofit watchdog group and think tank that "want[s] schools to return to their traditional mission-the quest for truth". The AIA claims to promote academic freedom and is particularly critical of what it describes as a left-wing bias in American academia. The AIA characterizes such bias as liberal or communist "indoctrination", and aims to stand up for the rights of politically conservative students and faculty.

== History ==
The AIA was founded in 1985 by columnist Reed Irvine as an outgrowth of Accuracy in Media.

The AIA is run by executive director Malcolm Kline. Its previous executive director was Daniel J. Flynn, the author of the book Why the Left Hates America.

The group was criticized by prominent conservative and first Secretary of Education, William Bennett, who described AIA as "a bad idea" at the time of its founding in 1986.

== Reception ==
In 1985 the American Association of University Professors claimed that the AIA is a threat to academic freedom due to the group's efforts to recruit students to report professors alleged to "disseminate misinformation". Some have described the AIA as a "useful irritant".

== See also ==
- Academic Freedom bills
