= Lawrence G. Walters =

American lawyer

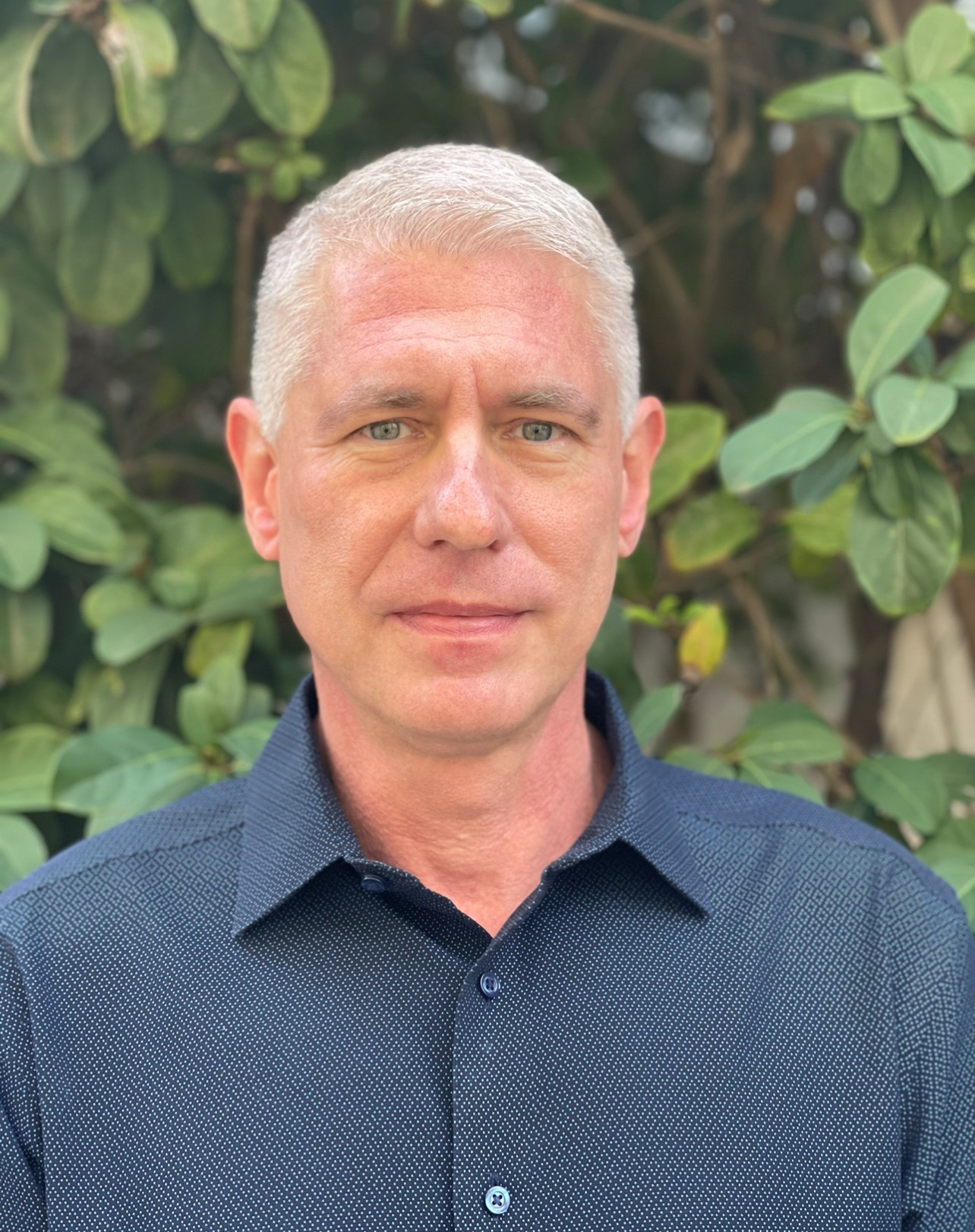
- Born: November 11, 1963 (age 63); Chicago
- Education: University of Central Florida (BA); Florida State University (JD)
- Occupation: Attorney

Lawrence G. Walters (born 11 November 1963) is an American First Amendment attorney and anti-censorship advocate. He is the head of the Walters Law Group, focusing on First Amendment and Internet law, and has served as an adjunct professor of Legal Studies at the University of Central Florida.

== Early life and education ==
Walters was born in and grew up in Chicago. He graduated from the University of Central Florida in 1985. He received his JD from Florida State University with honors.

== Legal career ==
Walters is an expert in adult entertainment and obscenity law who represents clients in the live webcam industry. He also specializes in online gaming and sports betting law. Walters works in the field of free speech, and represents the interests of the online entertainment community, and began his career as an attorney in 1988. He has defended website operators in high-profile obscenity cases. In 1999, Walters defended Tammy Robinson in the first obscenity case based on website content. Walters has defended Chris Wilson against more than 300 obscenity charges arising from his operation of a controversial website which included images from the wars in Iraq and Afghanistan. The case represented the first obscenity prosecution against a website based on user-generated content.

In 2007, Walters defended Karen Fletcher, who was charged with obscenity based on written stories published on her website in a case tested the boundaries of obscenity law. In 2008, he was appointed President of the First Amendment Lawyers Association. Walters also defended Clinton McCowen, where he introduced Google Trends evidence showing that online users were more interested in sexually explicit topics than in generic terms like "apple pie" or "watermelon." The case was settled shortly after Walters issues a subpoena to Google for supporting evidence.

Walters is also known as an advocate for the free speech rights of protesters, street performers, and topless dancers. For example, in 2006 he won an appellate court victory upholding the First Amendment right of a topless protester in Daytona Beach, Florida. Walters has also worked with the online gambling industry, representing GoldenPalace.com against the Commonwealth of Kentucky in the state's efforts to seize the domain based on alleged gambling violations. He has also represented internet cafes in constitutional challenges to local ordinances banning the use of simulated gambling devices.

In 2009, Walters began representing teens accused of sex offenses based on sexting behavior and advocating changes in states' laws relating to teen sexting. Walters has also developed apps used by content producers to comply with federal age verification laws and enforce copyrights.

In 2018, Walters filed a constitutional challenge to the federal law known as the Allow States and Victims to Fight Online Sex Trafficking Act of 2017 (FOSTA), on behalf of the Woodhull Sexual Freedom Alliance, and others. The plaintiffs argue that the law violates the First Amendment and puts sex workers at risk.
