= Christopher Rissel =

Australian health promotion expert (born 1961)

Christopher Rissel (born 20 July 1961) is an Australian health promotion expert. The son of German migrants to Australia, he attended St Aloysius' College (Sydney) and graduated in 1979. He received a BSc Psych (Hons) from the University of New South Wales in 1985, a Master of Public Health from the University of Sydney in 1990, and PhD from the University of Minnesota (United States) in 1994.

Rissel has worked in health promotion in several Area Health Services in New South Wales, and was the Director of the Health Promotion Service in the Sydney South West Area Health Service (2000-2011). He has over 350 peer-reviewed publications and dozens of research reports. One significant project was the Australian Study of Health and Relationships, the first large scale (n=19,207) national sexual health survey of Australians, covering topics including age of first sex, numbers of partners, prostitution, BDSM, circumcision. The results of the Second Australian Study of Health and Relationships were published in volume 11, issue 5 of the journal Sexual Health, 2014 noting changes since the first study.

Research interests now focus on childhood obesity prevention, and the promotion of active travel, particularly cycling He is co-author of the report 'Cycling: Getting Australia Moving – Barriers, facilitators and interventions to get more Australians physically active through cycling' and was invited to address the 2009 New Zealand National Cycling Conference. He led the NSW Health Promotion Demonstration Research Project Cycling Connecting Communities from 2007 to 2009. He is currently the Chief Investigator of the Sydney Transport and Health Study, an ARC funded study to evaluate the impact of a new bicycle path in inner Sydney.

He was the Editor-in-Chief of the Health Promotion Journal of Australia from 1992 to 1998, and is actively involved in the New South Wales Branch of the Australian Health Promotion Association. He is on the editorial board for the Health Promotion Journal of Australia, and the Journal of Transport and Health.

He was the Director of the NSW Office of Preventive Health based in the South Western Sydney Local Health District from 2012 to 2020, and is an Honorary Professor at the Sydney School of Public Health, University of Sydney (from 2011).

He is now working as a Senior Research Fellow at Flinders University, based in Darwin, Northern Territory.
