= Kate Michelman =

American political activist (born 1942)

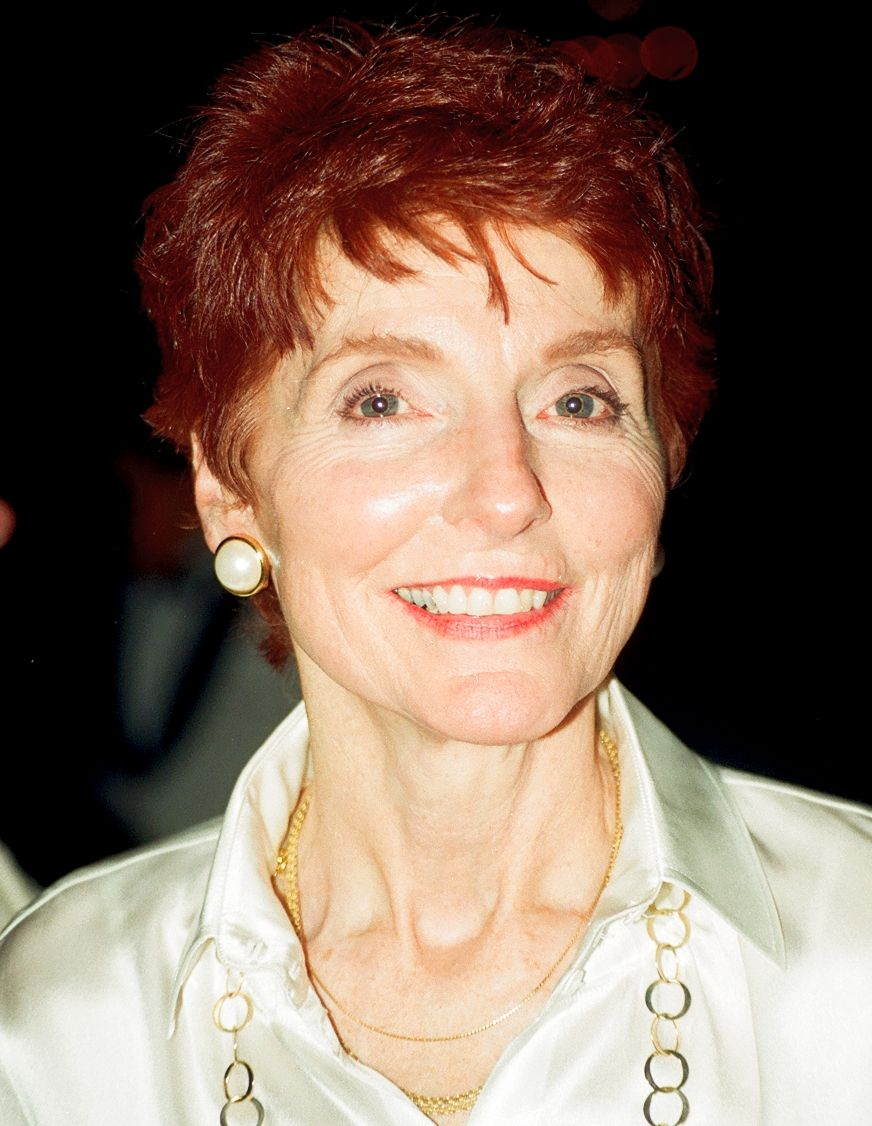
Michelman in 1999

Kate Michelman (born August 4, 1942) is an American political activist. She is best known for her work in the United States abortion rights movement, particularly as a long-time president of NARAL Pro-Choice America.

== Career ==
From 1985 to 2004, Michelman served as president of NARAL, a major abortion rights advocacy organization in the United States.

In 2003, she received the Humanist Heroine Award from the American Humanist Association.

Following her departure from NARAL, she worked as a political consultant and published her memoir, With Liberty and Justice for All: A Life Spent Protecting the Right to Choose, with Hudson Street Press in 2006. She also testified against Supreme Court justices Samuel Alito and Clarence Thomas at their confirmation hearings. In 2003, Michelman was named on the PoliticsPA list of "Pennsylvania's Most Politically Powered Women."

In 2012, she and Carol Tracy were selected to be co-chairs of WomenVotePA, a nonpartisan political campaign focused on raising women voter turnout in the state of Pennsylvania and advancing the idea that women's health, economic security, and personal safety are at stake in every election.

== Personal life ==
Michelman is married with several children. She left her career as a political consultant to care for one of her daughters, after her daughter was paralyzed in a horse-riding accident in 2002, and for her husband, who was diagnosed with Parkinson's disease. Due to problems with their health insurance, Michelman's family faced large hospital bills, particularly after her husband fractured his hip in a fall. Michelman stated that because of her family's mounting health care bills, her family had "literally fallen from the middle-class to potentially having nothing." Her husband's assisted living bills totaled $9,000 a month and Michelman was forced to cash in her I.R.A. to help pay for her daughter's health care costs.
