= Kushaba Moses Mworeko =

Kushaba Moses Mworeko (born 1 February 1979 in Kagonge, Bushenyi) is a Ugandan LGBT rights activist, combat medic and blogger. Mworeko, who is gay, was involved in a U.S. asylum case following an interview he gave to an LGBTQ newspaper in the U.S. (Metro Weekly) which published the interview in 2010 along with his picture and full identity—effectively outing him. Following that publication, a Ugandan tabloid saw the interview and reprinted portions of it along with his picture with the headline: "[This] Gay Monster Raped Boys in School but Failed to Bonk Wife" – effectively distorting the content of that interview and putting his life in danger in a country like Uganda where homosexuality is illegal and where at the time Ugandan Member of Parliament (MP) David Bahati has introduced his "Kill the Gays Bill". According to a 28 September 2010 issue published on Box Turtle Bulletin and authored by writer Jim Burroway, Burroway accused the Ugandan tabloid (Red Pepper) of "gay-baiting and gay-bashing journalism" and for "grossly distorting that same interview in its write-up."

== Early life ==
Mworeko was born on 1 February 1979 in Kagonge, Bushenyi District, Uganda to a "well-to-do family"; he was the oldest of six children. His father was a business man. Mworeko was born in Kagonge but attended boarding school from the age of 7 in the district. Mworeko also lived with his father in Ishaka. His father died when Mworeko was finishing elementary school, and his mother when he was 15 years old in junior school; both of his parents died from AIDS–related illnesses.

== Outing and asylum ==
In October 2009, as Ugandan politician David Bahati introduced the Anti-Homosexuality Bill, Mworeko—who commonly goes by his middle name, Moses—made his first trip to the United States. The official purpose of his visit was to participate in an HIV/AIDS conference on South Padre Island, Texas. Although that conference was the official purpose given for such a visit, Mworeko had also hoped of "finding a U.S. port to shelter him from the homophobic storm back in Uganda." As a gay Ugandan living in the closet in his home country, he was unable to disclose that fact from his country of origin in-light of the political and social climate in Uganda relating to LGBT issues.

In November 2009, Mworeko's visa expired, but he chose to remain in the United States out of fear of returning to Uganda. From Texas, he traveled to Washington, D.C., where he took part in a press conference organized by several LGBT rights organizations, including the Human Rights Campaign, Truth Wins Out, GLAAD, and Americans United for Separation of Church and State. The event was held to oppose the February 2010 National Prayer Breakfast organized by The Fellowship Foundation.

According to the U.S.-based LGBT publication Metro Weekly, The Fellowship—also known as "The Family"—had been linked to David Bahati and other anti-LGBT figures in Uganda. Bahati had reportedly been invited to attend the National Prayer Breakfast.

In response, Mworeko joined Truth Wins Out and other advocacy groups in The American Prayer, a counter-event that protested alleged ties between The Fellowship and supporters of Uganda's Anti-Homosexuality Bill, which critics widely referred to as the "Kill the Gays" bill.

Although Mworeko spoke at the press conference, he did so under his middle name, Moses, and concealed his identity by wearing a bag over his head. At the time, he feared that being publicly identified as gay could expose him to persecution and place his safety at risk if he returned to Uganda.In July 2010 (five months after the event), Mworeko gave his first interview to Will O’Bryan of Metro Weekly in which he revealed his full identity. In that 2010 interview, Mworeko told O’Bryan that he was in the United States to attend a HIV/AIDS conference - the same time the "Kill the Gays Bill" was being introduced in Uganda. He also relayed to O’Bryan that, in-light of the political and social climate in his country pertaining to LGBT issues, he feared for his life and decided to overstay his visa and sought political asylum in the United States. Mworeko's original application for asylum was denied by the U.S. authorities, to which he later appealed.

With both his parents dead due to AIDS–related illnesses, and impelled to flee Uganda due its Anti-Homosexuality Bill, Mworeko's interview with the Washington D.C.'s lesbian and gay Metro Weekly magazine was published with his full identity and picture on the cover of their magazine with the headline "The Promised Land" — in reference to his legal asylum in the U.S. The Ugandan tabloid Red Pepper saw the U.S. interview Mworeko gave and reprinted portions of it in its 24 September 2010 issue with the headline (including his picture): "[This] Gay Monster Raped Boys in School but Failed to Bonk Wife", and then went on to publish the following distorted version of the U.S. interview Mworeko gave to Metro Weekly:

"Today we expose Moses Kushaba Mworeko a gay monster who has confessed to viciously raping kids in primary school and setting off a sex craze that swept throughout the school like wildfire. ... He made his disgusting confession in The Metro Weekly a Newspaper in the US. In his sordid interview Mworeko, 31, brags how he started bonking his primary school boyfriend and how his act of bonking a fellow boy was copied by all the boys in his dormitory."

Following that write-up by the Ugandan-based tabloid, Jim Burroway of Box Turtle Bulletin wrote a piece in which he criticized Red Pepper of "gay-baiting and gay-bashing journalism" and for "grossly distorting that same interview in its write-up."

In response to the distorted version provided in the Red Pepper write-up, Wayne Besen, activist and Founding Executive Director of Truth Wins Out accused Red Pepper of "sparking anti-gay witch-hunts"; "a vile smear campaign"; and called for the paper to be closed with the following criticism:

"In all my years of activism, this has got to be the most disgusting, immoral, vile, smear campaign that I have ever witnessed. The Red Pepper should be immediately shut down for its libelous reporting and slimy journalism. This hit piece shows that we must redouble our efforts to stop the hate campaign that has infected Uganda and other nations in Africa. We must ensure that U.S. evangelicals stop spreading their special brand of murderous love on this continent.
Clearly, Moses’ life is in grave danger. The United States government should put Moses on the fast-track to citizenship to keep him from being slaughtered."

Courted by the U.S. media following that exposé which has garnered attention both in the U.S. and Uganda, Mworeko gave an interview to KPFA's journalist Ann Garrison about his predicament and the situation for LGBT Ugandans back home. In that interview, published in OpEdNews on 28 November 2010, Mworeko reiterated the danger on his life if he is to ever return to Uganda. He went on to state that certain newspapers such as "Red Pepper, Uganda's Rolling Stone, and the Onion, which published pictures and addresses of those they called Uganda's Top Homos" are known for outing those they suspect to be gay and putting their lives in danger. Even heterosexual advocates for LGBT rights such as Bishop Senyonjo have been wrongly labeled as gay just because he supports LGBT rights, and these "witch hunting tabloids in Uganda" have kept asking the government to hang the gays.

Facing incarceration and possible death, Mworeko remained in the U.S.–appealing his asylum. In May 2011, Mworeko was granted asylum by the U.S. after his first application was denied. He resides in Washington, D.C. As of July 2013, Mworeko was completing his U.S. National Guard training as a combat medic at Fort Sam Houston.

Now a U.S. citizen, Mworeko professed his love for Washington. In another interview with Metro Weekly published on 3 July 2013, Mworeko told Will O'Bryan (Metro Weekly's reporter):

"I love Washington, D.C.," [...] "It’s home. It’s taken care of me. Washingtonians have sheltered me. I can never thank Washingtonians enough."

== See also ==
Kisule Kato David

Cleopatra Kambugu

Steven Monjeza and Tiwonge Chimbalanga
