= Dan Massey =

American scientist, author, and activist (1942–2013)

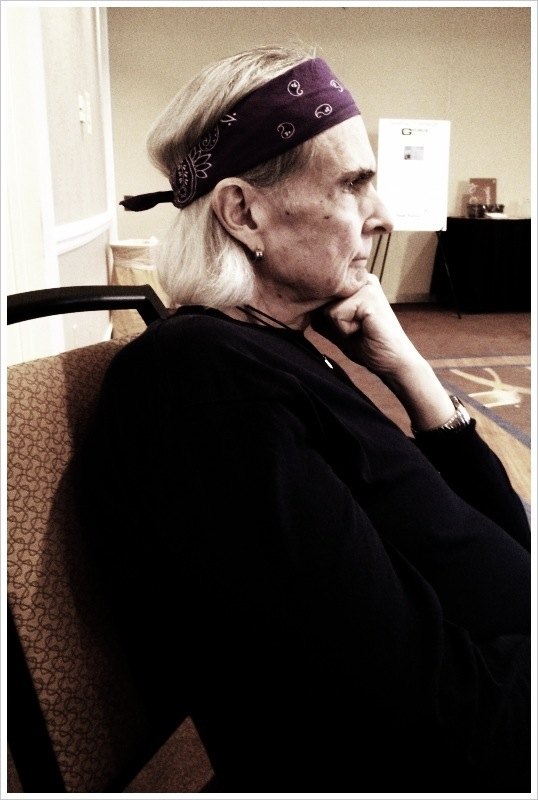
- Born: December 26, 1942
- Died: January 28, 2013 (aged 70); Washington, DC, U.S.
- Citizenship: American
- Education: M.I.T. and Harvard
- Occupations: LGBT rights/sexual freedom activist, scientist, author, and blogger
- Years active: 1972–2013
- Employer(s): BBN Technologies (1972–1994), Science Applications International Corporation (1994–2011) & VenusPlusX (2009–2013)
- Organization(s): VenusPlusX, COLUMBIA & Urantia Society of Central Connecticut
- Movement: LGBT rights, human rights, sexual freedom
- Partner: Alison Gardner
- Children: 2

Dan Massey (December 26, 1942 – January 28, 2013) was an American LGBT rights/sexual freedom activist, scientist, author, blogger, and fundraiser based in Washington, D.C. He was a co-founder and CEO of VenusPlusX.

A graduate of Massachusetts Institute of Technology and Harvard University Graduate School, he spent most of his professional life trying to make peoples' lives better through technology. He and his life partner of 35 years, Alison Gardner, were known for their work "revealing to the public a new concept of the intrinsic value of sex and gender expression, of personal erotic freedom, to replace millennia of unreasoned ignorance, fear, and hatred with the true joy of Love." Through his blog and archived papers on VenusPlusX.org, Massey attempted to provide a vision of the values of the New Age from varied perspectives.

On January 28, 2013, Massey died following a brief battle with cancer.

== Professional work ==
Massey's professional activities were in the fields of Computer Science and Information Systems Engineering. He was a graduate of MIT and Harvard University. He authored seven books in the areas of Artificial Intelligence, Probability & Statistics, and Managing Computers in Business.

He was a technology development executive, experienced in distributed simulation, artificial intelligence, mathematical linguistics, experimental psychology and metamathematics, all of which informed his views on the nature, expression, and true purpose of the erotic senses.

Massey worked for BBN Technologies in Cambridge, Massachusetts as Chief Engineer from May 1972 to January 1994. He then went on to work for Science Applications International Corporation in Vienna, Virginia as Senior Scientist from January 1994 until his retirement in January 2011.

== Activism ==
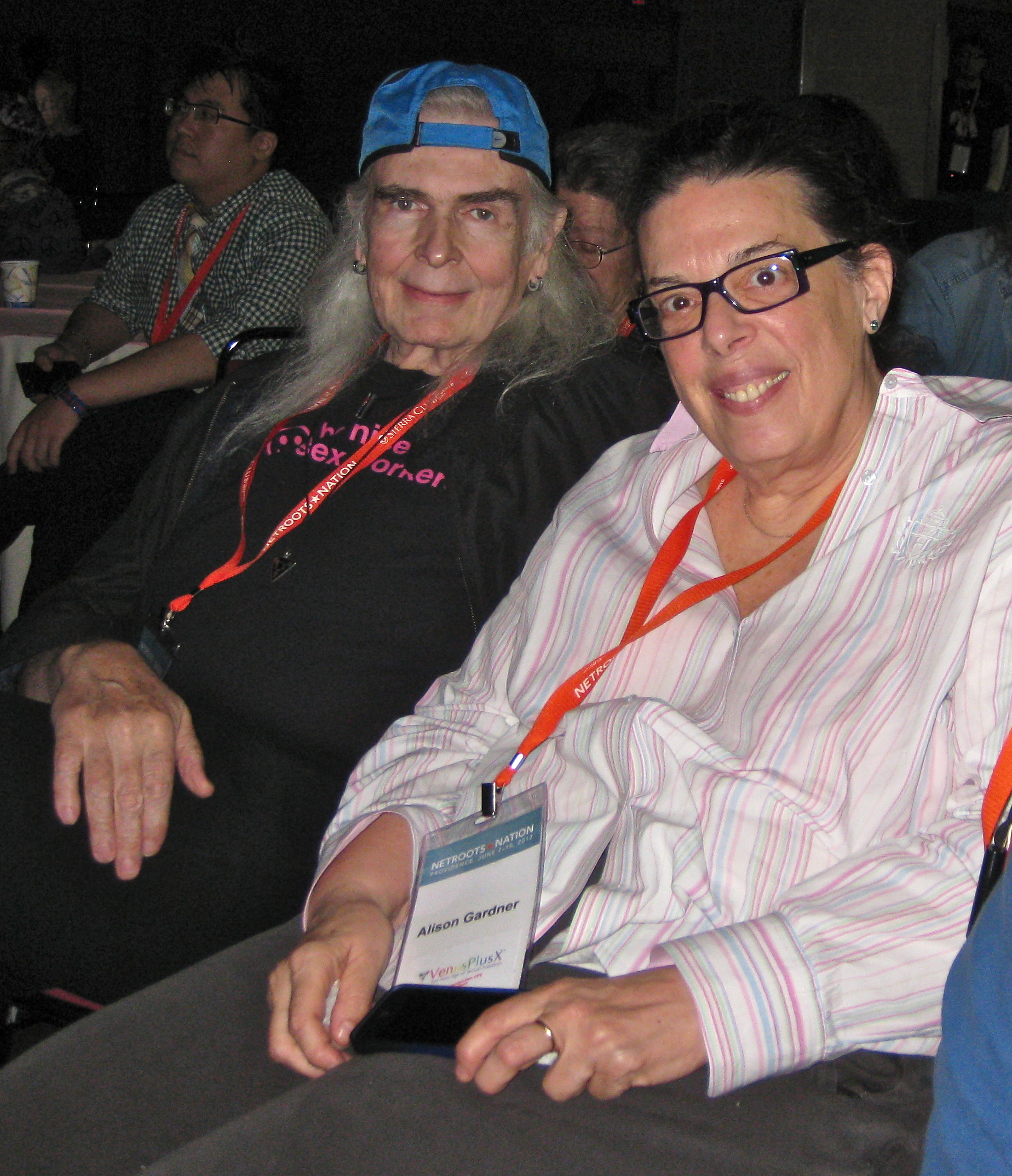
Massey and his life partner, Alison Gardner, attending Netroots Nation 2012

=== The Urantia Book ===
Massey served for more than two decades on the executive committee of the Urantia Book Fellowship as chairman of committees addressing faith outreach, publications, education, and judicial & legal affairs before retiring from this apprenticeship to focus on the cause of freedom and equality. He founded the Urantia Society of Central Connecticut and the author of many articles exploring the content and implications of the Urantia Papers.

=== LGBT rights activism ===
Massey was an independent activist committed to liberty, freedom, justice, and equality for all people. With Gardner, Massey co-founded COLUMBIA, a "vision of the future development of human society as it embraces new insights into the essential spiritual value of erotic pleasure". The couple hosted numerous fundraisers and networking events in their home and supported many public LGBTQ events. They worked closely with local and national organizations, helping forge new alliances and coalitions. Massey was dedicated to "the establishment of total freedom of sexual orientation and gender identity as sacred, god-given gifts of divine pleasure and joy to all humanity".

Massey was a member of the Advisory Council of Woodhull Sexual Freedom Alliance, the Policy Advisory Board of Gender Rights Maryland, and the WikiQueer Global Advisory Board. Gardner remains a member of all three projects.

=== VenusPlusX ===
In 2009, Massey and Gardner, co-founded VenusPlusX, the project Massey used to inform and uplift that social system, through education, training, advocacy, and communications to support and accelerate the New Age. VenusPlusX takes its name from a science fiction novel set in a post-gender future (Theodore Sturgeon, 1999), and it draws inspiration from two famous American androgynous, transgender icons – the Statue of Liberty, and "Columbia" on the Capitol dome.

== See also ==
- Fundamental rights
- Human rights
- Sexual repression
- Woodhull Sexual Freedom Alliance
