= Matt Foreman (activist) =

American activist

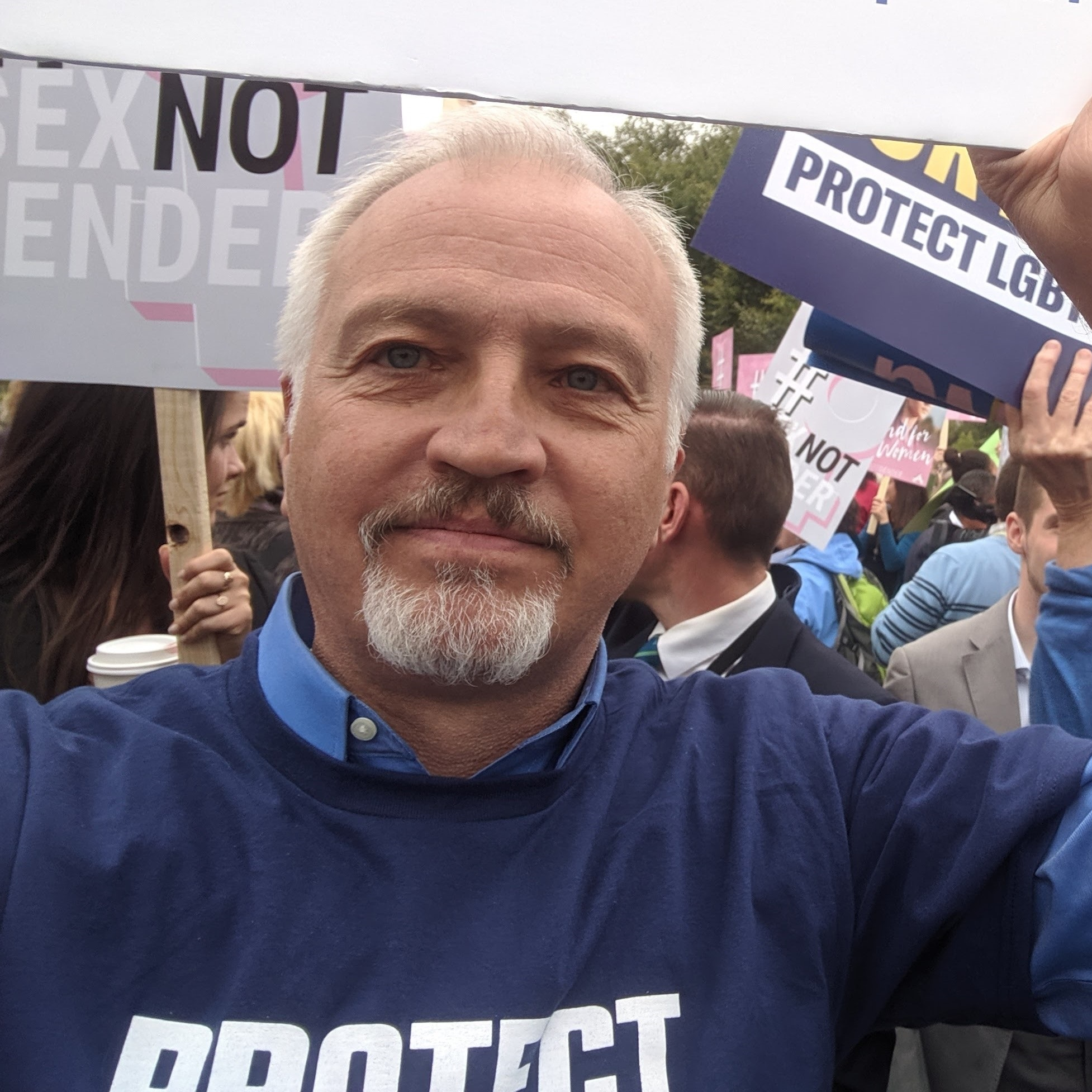
- Organization(s): NYC Gay & Lesbian Anti-Violence Project, Empire State Pride Agenda, National Gay and Lesbian Task Force, Evelyn and Walter Haas, Jr. Fund, and AIDS Legal Referral Panel.
- Movement: LGBT rights movement
- Spouse: Francisco DeLeon

Matt Foreman is an American lesbian, gay, bisexual and transgender (LGBT) rights lawyer and activist with a background in political advocacy and civil rights work. He is executive director of the AIDS Legal Referral Panel in San Francisco.

== Early life and education ==
Foreman attended college at West Virginia Wesleyan College, where he was an anti-strip mining activist and president of the student body. He then went to New York University School of Law, where he was a Root-Tilden Scholar and the first openly gay President of the Student Bar Association.

== Activism ==
Foreman was executive director of the NYC Gay & Lesbian Anti-Violence Project from 1990 to 1996 and the Empire State Pride Agenda from 1997 to 2003. He was executive director of the National Gay and Lesbian Task Force from May 2003 until 2008. From 2008 to 2023, he was a program director at the Haas Jr. Fund, overseeing its work in the areas of LGBT and immigrant rights. He was co-chair of the Civil Marriage Collaborative which helped raise over $163 million to secure the freedom to marry nationwide.

While working at the Pride Agenda, he led campaigns that resulted in enactment of a statewide nondiscrimination law, Sexual Orientation Non-Discrimination Act, a hate crimes law and several laws extending equal benefits to the surviving partners of those killed on 9/11. Under his leadership, measures also were passed providing $15 million for LGBT health and human services in New York state.

While at the National Gay & Lesbian Task Force, the organization more than doubled its budget to $10 million, staff grew from 25 to 54, and the Board expanded from 12 to 35; and founded and led United ENDA, the largest coalition in the LGBT movement's history, to oppose efforts to strip gender identity protections from a federal nondiscrimination bill.

His tenure at the Anti-Violence Project is remembered for focusing the city's attention on anti-gay violence, resulting in important changes in police training, deployment and responsiveness. His work at AVP is highlighted in a current HBO documentary, Last Call: When a Serial Killer Stalked Queer New York.

Prior to his work in the gay rights field, Foreman was involved in prison policy and administration for ten years, including service as assistant commissioner of the West Virginia Department of Corrections, executive assistant to the New York City Commissioner of Correction, and director of a medium/minimum-security facility on Rikers Island.

Foreman is a founding member of Heritage of Pride, which LGBT Pride events in New York City, and a former member of the New York City Human Rights Commission.

== See also ==
- Employment Non-Discrimination Act
- Campaign to Defend the Constitution
