= National LGBTQ Task Force =

US gay rights organization

- Formation: 1973; 53 years ago (as National Gay Task Force) founded by Robert L. Livingston, Tom Ellis, and Howard Brown
- Headquarters: Washington, D.C., U.S.
- Region served: United States
- Executive director: Kierra Johnson
- Deputy Director, Strategic Advancement: Sayre E. Reece
- Deputy Director, People and Culture: Alicia Boykins
- Website: thetaskforce.org
- Formerly called: National Gay Task Force; National Gay and Lesbian Task Force

The National LGBTQ Task Force (formerly National Gay Task Force; National Gay and Lesbian Task Force) is an American social justice advocacy non-profit organizing the grassroots power of the lesbian, gay, bisexual, transgender, and queer (LGBTQ) community. Also known as The Task Force, the organization supports action and activism on behalf of LGBTQ people and advances a progressive vision of liberation. The past executive director was Rea Carey from 2008-2021 and the current executive director is Kierra Johnson, who took over the position in 2021 to become the first Black woman to head the organization.

The Task Force organizes the annual Creating Change conference, a skills-building event for community and allies with over 2,000 attendees each year. The Task Force Policy Institute think tank conducts social science research, policy analysis, strategy development, public education, and advocacy.

== History ==
Founded in 1973 as the National Gay Task Force, the organization became the National Gay and Lesbian Task Force in 1985. It adopted its current identity in October 2014. The founders of the National Gay Task Force included Robert L. Livingston and his husband, Tom Ellis; Dr. Howard Junior Brown; Dr. Bruce Voeller; Father Robert Carter, a Roman Catholic priest; Ron Gold; Nathalie Rockhill; Dr. Martin Duberman; and Dr. Frank Kameny. Later board members included Lani Ka'ahumanu, who was the first out bisexual to be invited and to serve on a national gay and lesbian board.

The Task Force has acted to promote LGBTQ rights and acceptance. In 2005, the Task Force protested against the Instruction Concerning the Criteria for the Discernment of Vocations with regard to Persons with Homosexual Tendencies in view of their Admission to the Seminary and to Holy Orders, prohibiting the ordination of Catholic homosexual seminarians. In 2010, Jaime Grant, then director of the Task Force's Policy Institute, introduced the idea of a bright pink sticker for people to stick on census envelopes which had a form for them to check a box for either "lesbian, gay, bisexual, transgender or straight ally", which her group called "queering the census". Although the sticker was unofficial and the results were not added to the census, she and others' goal was to include the statistic in the 2020 census.

In 2013, the Task Force received the Large Nonprofit Organization of the Year award as part of the Pantheon of Leather Awards.

== Creating Change conference ==
The annual National Conference on LGBT Equality: Creating Change was first held in 1988, one year after aiding in the organization of the Second National March on Washington for Lesbian and Gay Rights. The Task Force has added and changed components of the conference over the years. For example, in 2003, the Creating Change conference featured the first ever Skills Academy for Leadership and Action, a daylong session dedicated to skills training for grassroots activists.

== Executives ==
Robert L Livingston, Broadway producer, producer of the Joey Bishop show, first openly gay Commissioner for Human Rights, New York City, his husband, artist Tom Ellis, and Doctor Howard Brown, Surgeon General of New York City; co-founders, 1973, New York City.

- Bruce Voeller (1973–1976; co-director 1976–1978)
- Jean O'Leary (co-director 1976–1979)
- Charles Brydon (co-director 1979–1981)
- Lucia Valeska (co-director 1979–1982)
- Virginia Apuzzo (1982–1986)
- Jeff Levi (1986–1989)
- Urvashi Vaid (1989–1992)
- Peri Jude Radecic (1992–1994)
- Melinda Paras (1994–1996)
- Kerry Lobel (1996–2000)
- Elizabeth Toledo (2000–2001)
- Lorri Jean (2001–2003)
- Matt Foreman (2003–2008)
- Rea Carey (2008–2021)
- Kierra Johnson (2021–present)

== National LGBTQ Wall of Honor ==
In February 2019, the Task Force, in conjunction with the Imperial Court System, announced a joint project, the National LGBTQ Wall of Honor, to be installed at the Stonewall Inn, to mark the 50th Anniversary of the Stonewall Riots. The Stonewall Inn is in the middle of New York's Greenwich Village, and is across from the Stonewall National Monument, the first U.S. National Monument dedicated to LGBTQ rights and history. The monument committee accepted nominations to honor "the lives of LGBTQ trailblazers, pioneers and s/heroes who have passed", and have had a positive impact on LGBTQ civil rights. The first fifty names were unveiled in June 2019 as part of the Stonewall 50 – WorldPride NYC 2019 celebration. The nominations are administered by a Board of Governors. LGBTQ leaders include transgender activist Marsha Botzer, Black LGBTQ activist Mandy Carter, LGBTQ youth advocate Wilson Cruz, LGBTQ human rights activist Stuart Milk, and founder of the Metropolitan Community Church Troy Perry.

== See also ==
- LGBT rights in the United States
- List of LGBT rights organizations
- Torie Osborn
- Ginny Vida
