= List of LGBTQ people from Chicago =

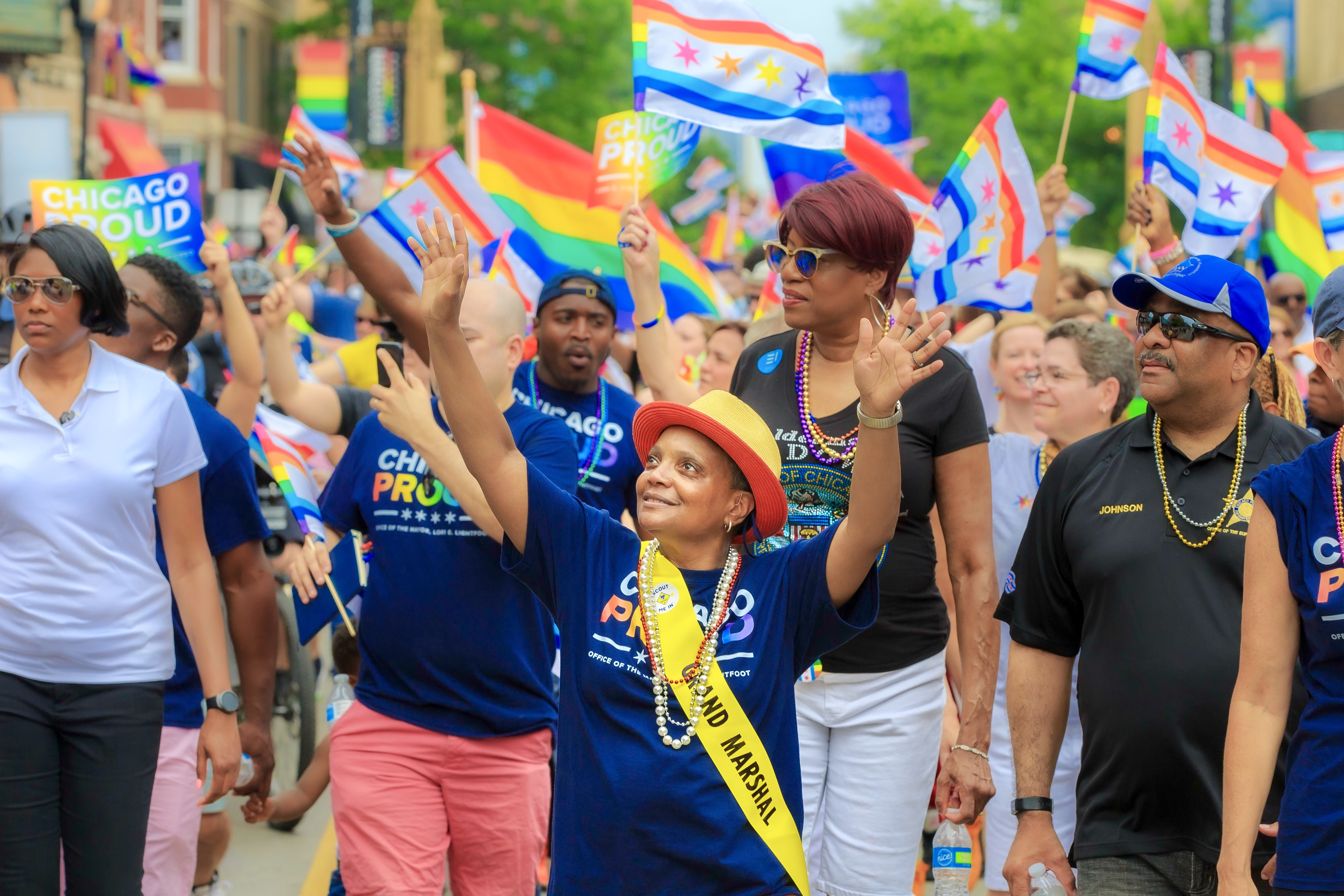
Lori Lightfoot, Chicago's first openly LGBT mayor, marching in the 2019 Chicago Pride Parade as grand marshal

This is a list of notable LGBTQ people from the city and metropolitan area of Chicago, Illinois.

== Activists ==
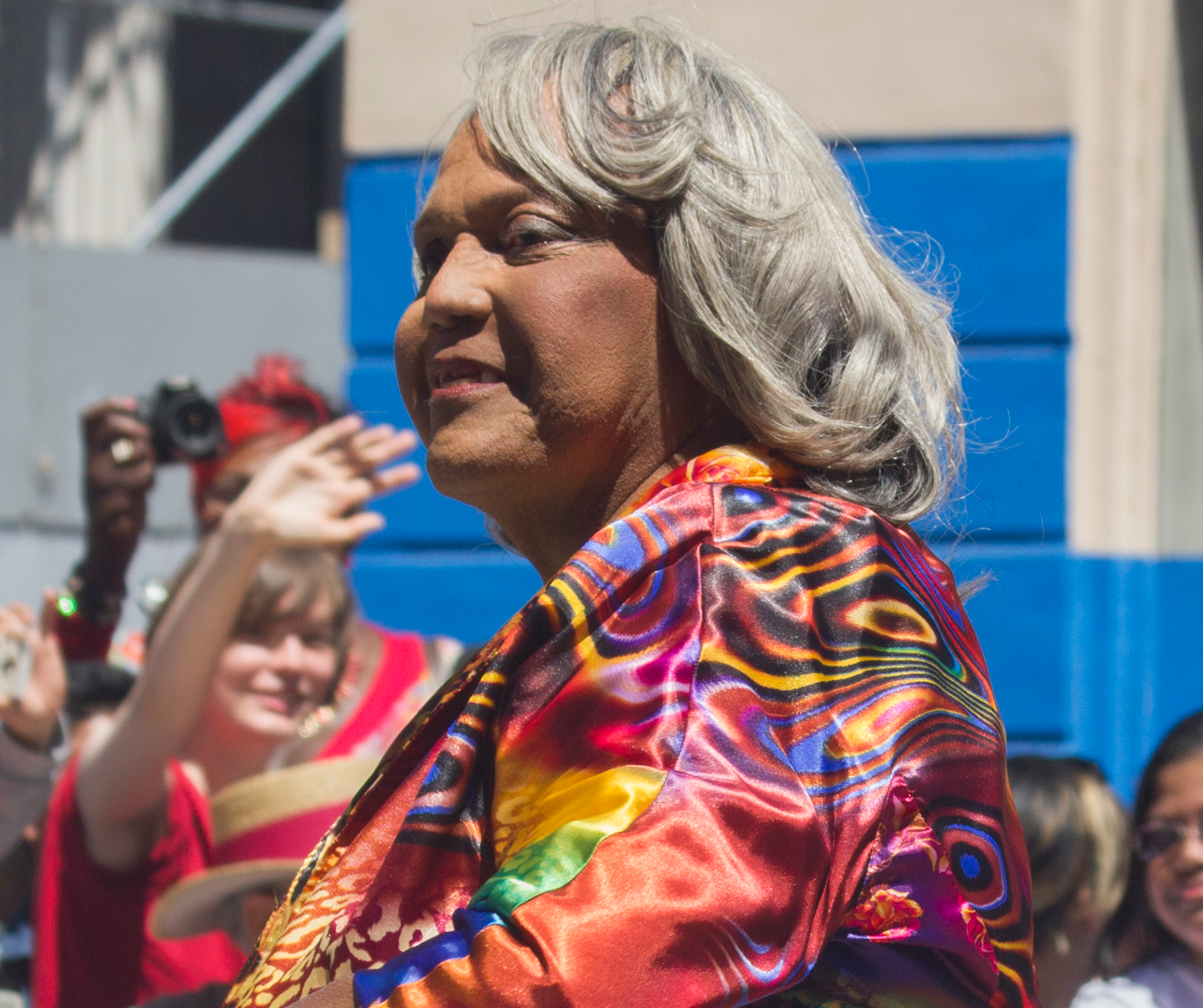
Miss Major Griffin-Gracy

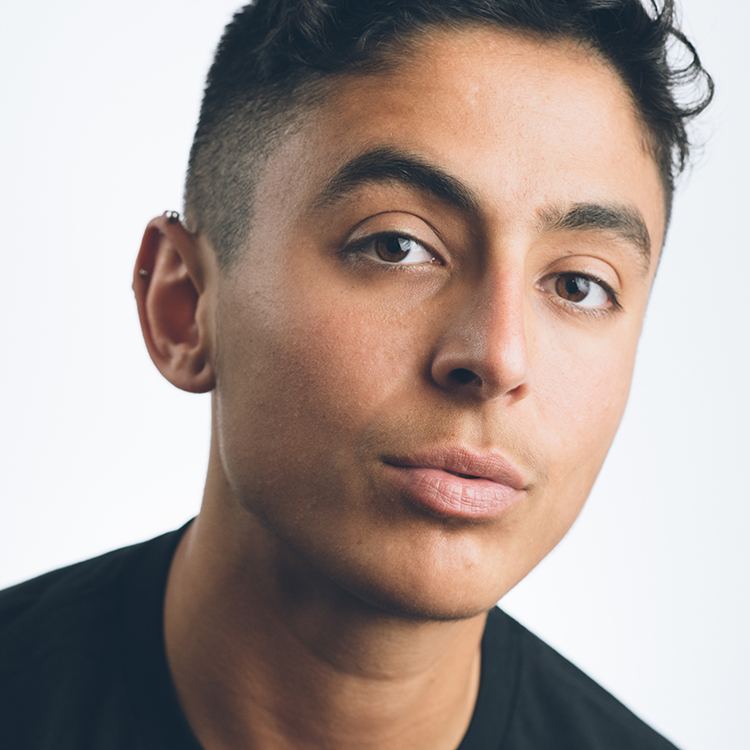
Pidgeon Pagonis

- Jane Addams – settlement activist, social reformer, Nobel Peace Prize laureate, and co-founder of Chicago's Hull House
- Gaylon Alcaraz – community organizer, activist, and former executive director of the Chicago Abortion Fund
- Lorrainne Sade Baskerville – social worker, activist, and founder of transgender social service agency TransGenesis
- Charlene Carruthers – activist and physical education teacher who director of Black Youth Project 100 and board member of SisterSong
- Shannon Downey – activist and crafter known for her work as a cross-stitcher in craftivism
- Henry Gerber – activist who founded the Society for Human Rights, the first LGBT rights organization in the country
- Vernita Gray – married her wife in Illinois's first same-sex marriage, helped organize Chicago's first pride parade, and helped found Lavender Woman, the city's first lesbian newspaper
- Peg Grey – activist, physical education teacher, and athlete who served as the first woman co-chair of the Federation of Gay Games
- Miss Major Griffin-Gracy – LGBT rights activist and former executive director at the Transgender Gender Variant Intersex Justice Project who was present at the pivotal Stonewall riots in 1969
- Jean Hardisty – activist who founded Political Research Associates and Chicago's first battered women's shelter
- Mary Morten – activist, documentary filmmaker, and author
- Pidgeon Pagonis – advocate for intersex people, documentary filmmaker, and youth leadership coordinator at Advocates for Informed Choice
- Craig Rodwell – gay rights activist known for founding the Oscar Wilde Memorial Bookshop in Greenwich Village, New York
- Ellen Gates Starr – settlement activist, social reformer, and co-founder of Chicago's Hull House with Jane Addams
- Phill Wilson – advocate for people of color with AIDS and former executive director of the Black AIDS Institute

== Aviation and military ==
- Allen R. Schindler Jr. – U.S. Navy radioman who was murdered by two of his shipmates for being gay
- Amanda Simpson – Airbus Americas vice president, former deputy assistant Secretary of Defense, and the first openly transgender federal political appointee in the United States
- Karen Ulane – transsexual pilot whose firing led to an ultimately unsuccessful 1983 lawsuit against Eastern Airlines under the Civil Rights Act of 1964

== Arts and entertainment ==
=== Actors ===
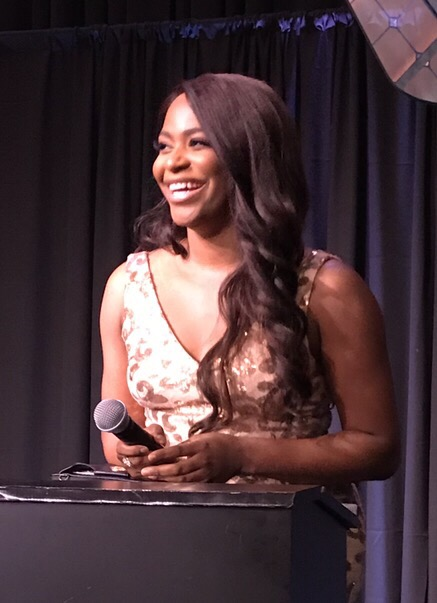
Alexandra Grey

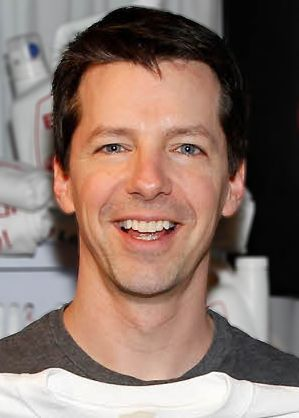
Sean Hayes in 2010

- Alexandra Billings – actor, teacher, and LGBT advocate known for playing Davina on Transparent
- Leyna Bloom – actor, dancer, and model who was the first openly transgender woman of color to appear in Vogue India
- Pat Bond – actor and performer known for appearing in the documentary Word Is Out (1978)
- Megan Cavanagh – played Marla Hooch in A League of Their Own and voiced Judy Neutron in several Jimmy Neutron movies and TV shows
- Parvesh Cheena – actor known for roles in Outsourced and Crazy Ex-Girlfriend
- Peter Coffield – actor known for his performance in the film Cry Rape
- Barry Dennen – actor, voice actor, and singer known for playing Pontius Pilate in Jesus Christ Superstar
- Cameron Esposito – actor in and co-creator of the television show Take My Wife, stand-up comedian, and creator of the podcast Queery
- John Franklin – actor who appeared in The Addams Family (1991)
- Kathleen Freeman – character actor known for her work with Jerry Lewis, The Blues Brothers, and Naked Gun 33 1/3: The Final Insult
- Garcia – actor and production assistant known for portraying Jake Rodriguez in Tales of the City
- Alexandra Grey – played roles on Empire, Transparent, and MacGyver
- Sean Hayes – actor, comedian, and producer known for his role as Jack McFarland on the sitcom Will & Grace
- Rock Hudson – prominent actor of the 1950s and 60s who portrayed leading roles in movies such as All That Heaven Allows, Magnificent Obsession, and Pillow Talk
- Pepi Lederer – actor, writer, niece of Marion Davies, and daughter of Reine Davies
- Jane Lynch – actor, comedian, and author best known for playing Sue Sylvester on Glee
- Lauren Patten – actor, singer, and writer who originated the character Jo in the musical Jagged Little Pill
- David Pevsner – actor, singer, dancer, and playwright
- Anthony Rapp – actor, writer, director, and photographer known for playing Mark Cohen as part of the original cast of Rent
- Robert Reed – actor best known for portraying Mike Brady in The Brady Bunch
- Brendan Scannell – actor and comedian known for his roles in Bonding and Heathers
- Jussie Smollett – actor and singer known for playing Jamal Lyon on Empire and for allegedly staging a hate crime against himself
- Theo Germaine – actor known for playing James on Netflix's The Politician
- Nico Tortorella – actor and former model known for Scream 4, The Following, and Younger

=== Adult entertainment ===
- Mia Isabella – transgender porn star
- Scott Masters – gay pornography producer and director who founded Nova Studios
- Dom Orejudos – leather artist, dancer, and choreographer who founded Kris Studios with Chuck Renslow
- Chuck Renslow – gay erotica publisher, businessman, and activist who founded one of the first leather bars in the world with Dom Orejudos

=== Comedians ===
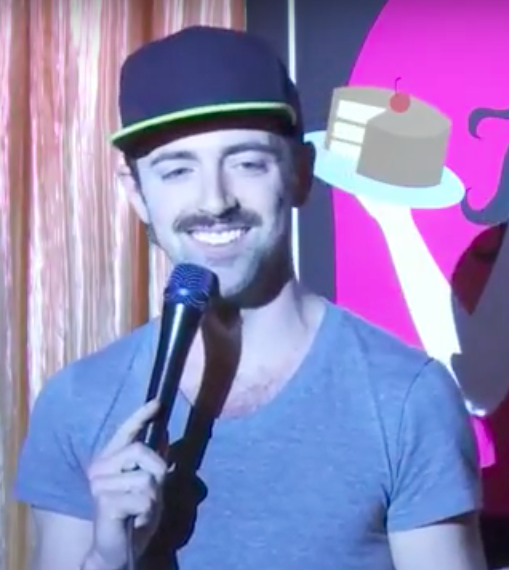
Matteo Lane

- Matt Bellassai – comedian, writer, and internet content creator
- Whitney Chitwood – stand-up comedian known for her comedy album The Bakery Case
- Matteo Lane – comedian and singer who starred in MTV's Guy Code and Joking Off
- Paula Pell – comedy writer, producer, and actor best known for her work on Saturday Night Live
- Irene Tu – stand-up comedian, actor, and producer
- Danitra Vance – comedian, actor, and repertory player on Saturday Night Live's eleventh season, the first black woman to hold such a role
- Jaboukie Young-White – stand-up comedian, television writer, and correspondent for The Daily Show

=== Culinary arts ===
- Art Smith – celebrity chef and founder of Common Threads, a children's charity

=== Dance ===
- Gerald Arpino – choreographer, artistic director, and dancer who co-founded the Joffrey Ballet with his romantic partner Robert Joffrey
- Brian Friedman – creative director, choreographer, and dancer known for appearing as a judge on So You Think You Can Dance? and for choreographing celebrities' music videos
- Loie Fuller – dancer, actor, and author known for creating the serpentine dance and for her innovations in theatrical lighting
- Craig Hall – ballet dancer, former soloist with the New York City Ballet, and faculty member at the School of American Ballet

=== Drag ===
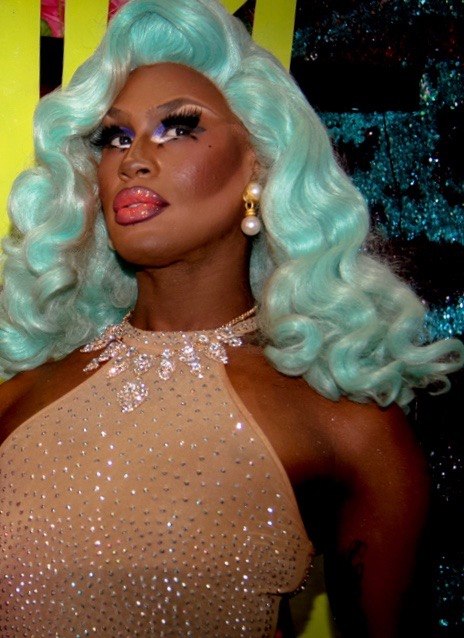
Shea Couleé, 2017

- Daya Betty - drag performer, contestant of (fourteenth season)
- Sigourney Beaver - drag performer, contestant of The Boulet Brothers' Dragula
- Sister Boom Boom – drag nun and astrologer
- Kim Chi – drag queen, artist, and cosmetics entrepreneur known for appearing on season 8 of RuPaul's Drag Race
- Shea Couleé – drag queen, model, and podcast host who appeared on season 9 of RuPaul's Drag Race, fifth season, and seventh season
- Denali – drag entertainer and ice skater who appeared on season 13 of RuPaul's Drag Race and the tenth season
- Detox - drag performer, recording artist, contestant of fifth season and second season
- Miss Foozie – drag performer
- Silky Nutmeg Ganache – drag queen who appeared on season 11 of RuPaul's Drag Race
- Gigi Goode – drag queen known for appearing on season 12 of RuPaul's Drag Race
- Gia Gunn – drag performer and competitor on season 6 of RuPaul's Drag Race, season 2 of The Switch Drag Race, and season 4 RuPaul's Drag Race All Stars
- Kahmora Hall - drag performer, contestant of the thirteenth season of RuPaul's Drag Race
- Monica Beverly Hillz – drag queen and transgender advocate known for appearing on fifth season of RuPaul's Drag Race and eighth season
- Brooke Lynn Hytes - drag queen, ballet dancer, contestant of the eleventh season of RuPaul's Drag Race, host and judge of Canada's Drag Race
- Tony Midnite – female impersonator, costume designer, and activist
- Naysha Lopez - drag performer, beauty pageant winner, contestant of the eighth season of RuPaul's Drag Race and eighth season
- Laila McQueen -drag performer, contestant of RuPaul's Drag Race and makeup artist of We're Here
- Phi Phi O'Hara - former drag queen (contestant of season 4 and season 2
- DiDa Ritz - drag performer, contestant on the fourth season of RuPaul's Drag Race
- Jade Sotomayor - drag queen, contestant of the first season of first season
- The Princess - drag performer, contestant of the fourth season of RuPaul's Drag Race
- Soju - retired drag queen, contestant of the eleventh season of RuPaul's Drag Race
- The Vixen – drag queen and co-founder of the Black Girl Magic drag show known for appearing on season 10 of RuPaul's Drag Race
- Utica Queen - drag performer, contestant of the thirteenth season of RuPaul's Drag Race, and on Project Runway
- Willow Pill -drag queen, winner of the fourteenth season of RuPaul's Drag Race

=== Film ===
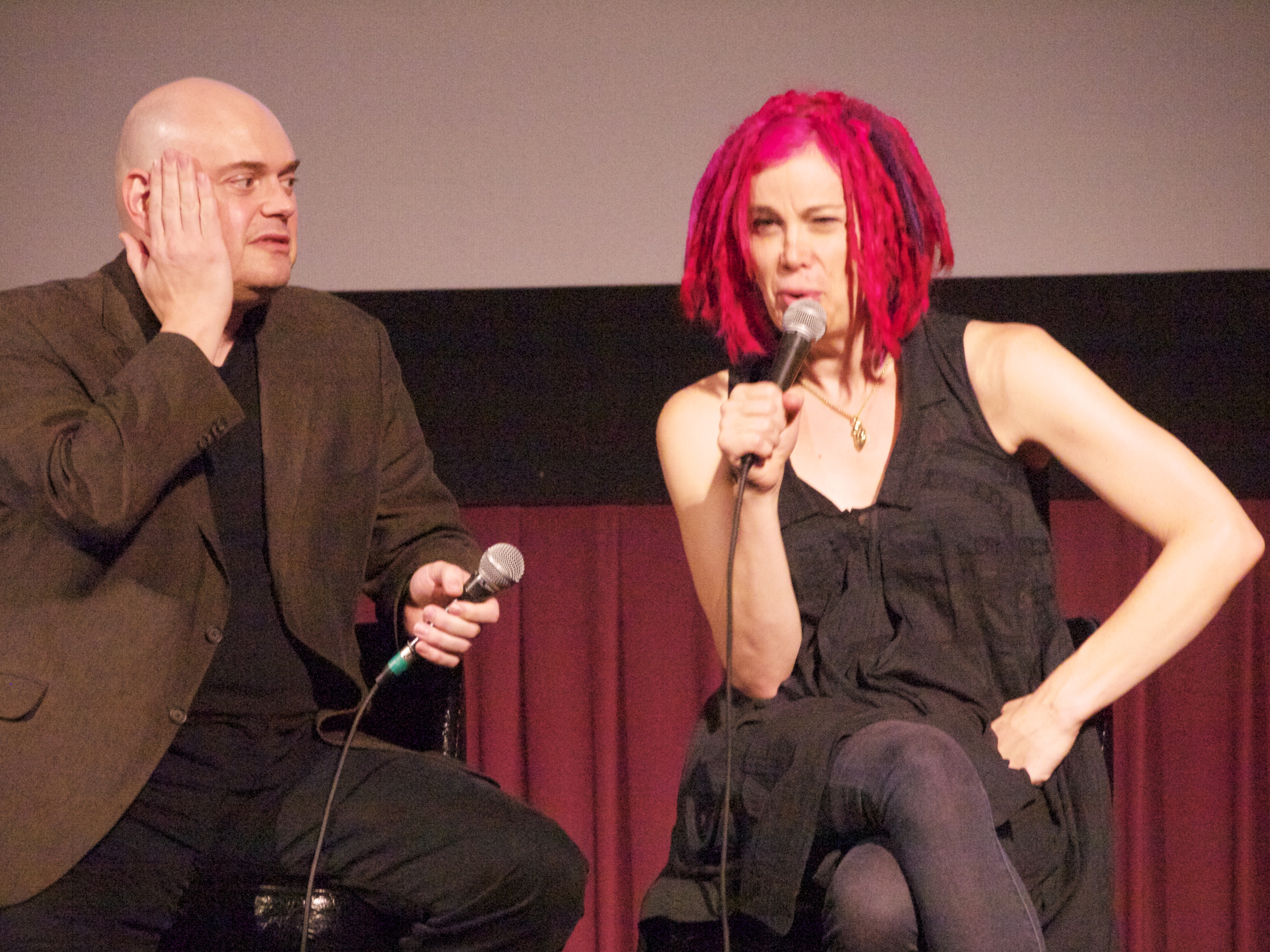
The Wachowskis, 2012

- Allan Carr – film and theater producer and talent manager
- Bill Damaschke – film producer who served as chief creative officer of DreamWorks Animation and president of animation and family entertainment at Skydance Media
- Angela Robinson – director, producer, and screenwriter known for D.E.B.S.
- Rose Troche – director, producer, writer, and actor who created the film Go Fish, which gave visibility to various aspects of lesbian culture
- The Wachowskis – filmmaker sisters known for The Matrix trilogy
- Aerlyn Weissman – Canadian documentary filmmaker and sound technician known for Forbidden Love: The Unashamed Stories of Lesbian Lives
- Yvonne Welbon – filmmaker and founder of the nonprofit Sisters in Cinema
- Tanya Wexler – filmmaker behind Hysteria

=== Internet personalities ===
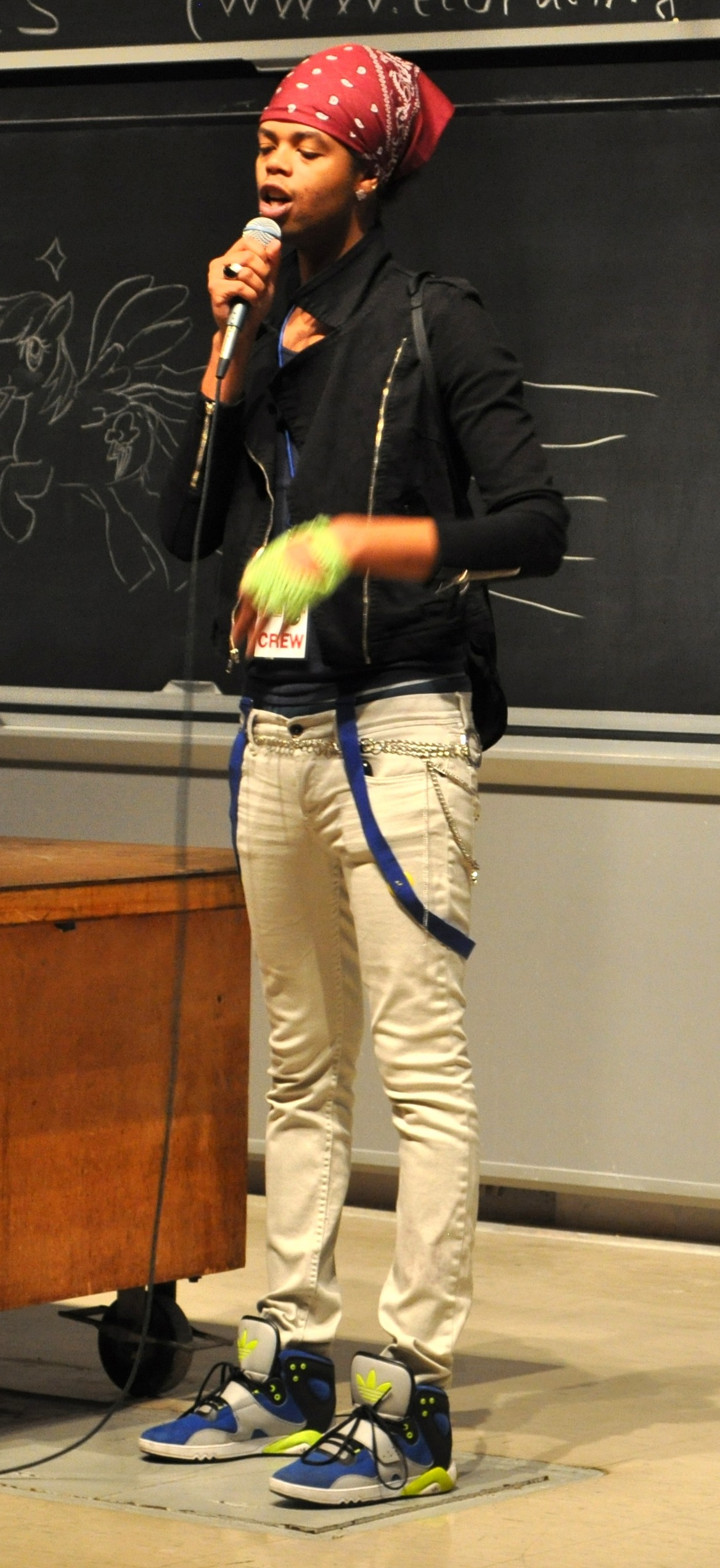
Antoine Dodson

- Brittany Ashley – actor and stand-up comedian known for her work with BuzzFeed
- Antoine Dodson – internet celebrity, singer, and entrepreneur known for being featured in "Bed Intruder Song"
- Dylan Geick – social media personality, writer, and wrestler

=== Music ===
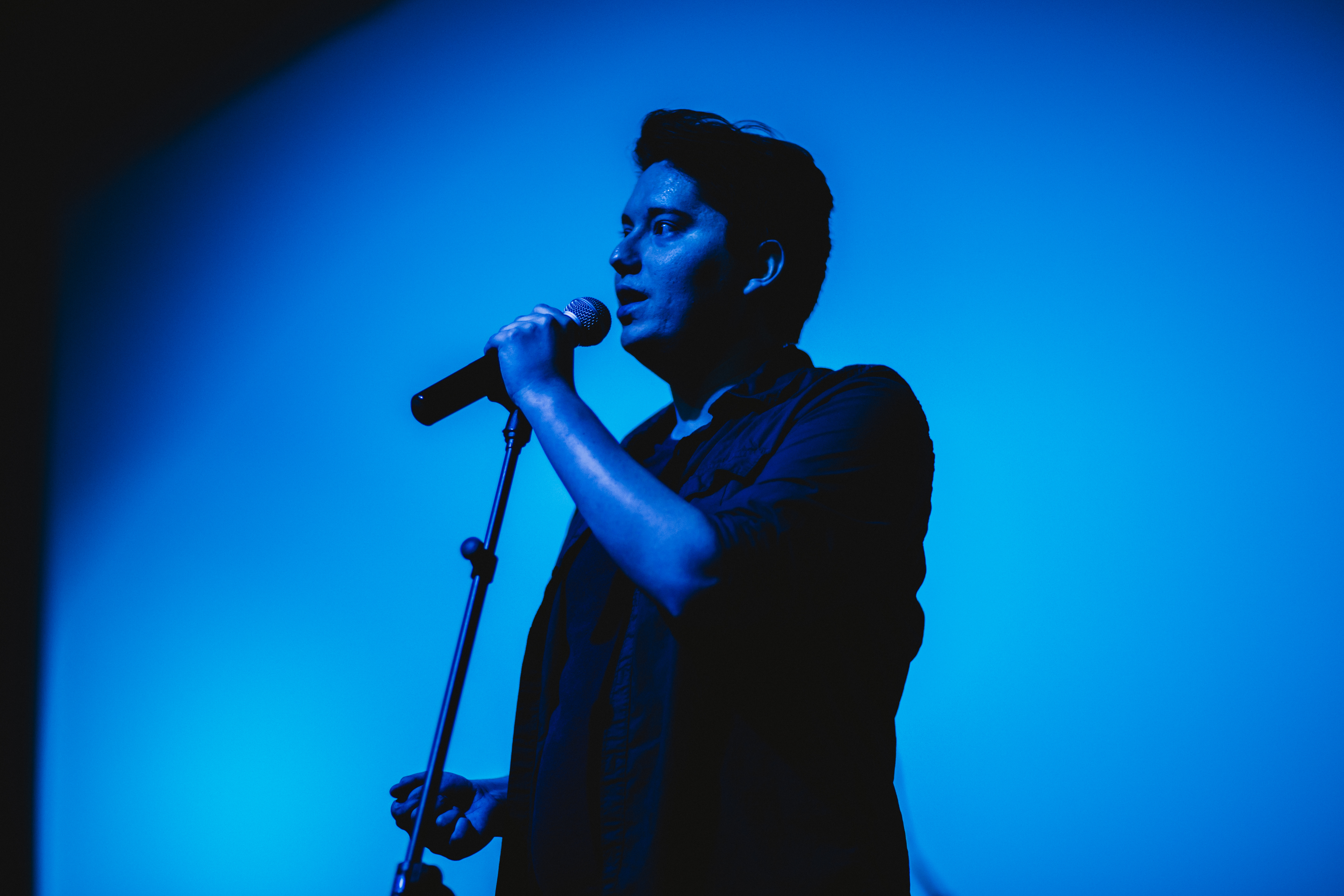
Adam Mardel

- Jeffery Austin – musician known for appearing on season 9 of The Voice
- Patricia Barber – jazz pianist and singer-songwriter
- Keith Barrow – singer-songwriter, entertainer, and son of civil rights activist Willie Barrow
- Taylor Bennett – hip-hop artist and brother of Chance the Rapper
- Terry Blade – singer-songwriter and lyricist
- Big Dipper – rapper and podcast host
- Da Brat – rapper and actor behind Funkdafied, the first rap album by a female artist to go platinum
- Anna DeShawn – American media personality, podcaster, and radio host
- Honey Dijon – D.J. and fashion plate
- K.Flay – singer, songwriter, producer, and rapper known for her debut album Life as a Dog
- Ezra Furman – singer-songwriter and former front person for Ezra Furman and the Harpoons
- Marla Glen – Germany-based singer, actor, songwriter, and leader of the Marla Glen Band who is known for her album This Is Marla Glen
- Laura Jane Grace – punk rock musician, transgender advocate, and author best known for leading the band Against Me!
- Steve Grand – singer-songwriter and model known for his homoerotic country song "All-American Boy"
- Tony Jackson – pianist, singer, and composer known for his song "Pretty Baby"
- Juba Kalamka – musician, hip-hop artist, and co-founder of Deep Dickollective
- Frankie Knuckles – music producer, remixer, and D.J. known as the "Godfather of House" for his contributions to the genre
- Adam Mardel – musician, songwriter, and member of the band Second Alibi
- Octo Octa – house producer and D.J.
- Chuck Panozzo – rock musician and bassist known for founding the band Styx
- Alan Pierson – conductor and artistic director
- Doug Pinnick – bassist and singer for King's X and KXM
- Martin Sorrondeguy – punk musician, documentary filmmaker, and photographer who founded the bands Los Crudos and Limp Wrist
- Lila Star – hip-hop artist, actor, and pageant competitor who is the self-proclaimed "first Latina trans rapper"
- Justin Tranter – songwriter, musician, and activist who has written music for the likes of Lady Gaga, Selena Gomez, and Justin Bieber
- Jim Verraros – singer and actor famous for appearing on the first season of American Idol

=== Photography ===
- Richard Renaldi – portrait photographer and Guggenheim fellow
- Edmund Teske – photographer
- Tom Bianchi – photographer, artist, and former attorney who specializes in male nude photography

=== Reality television ===
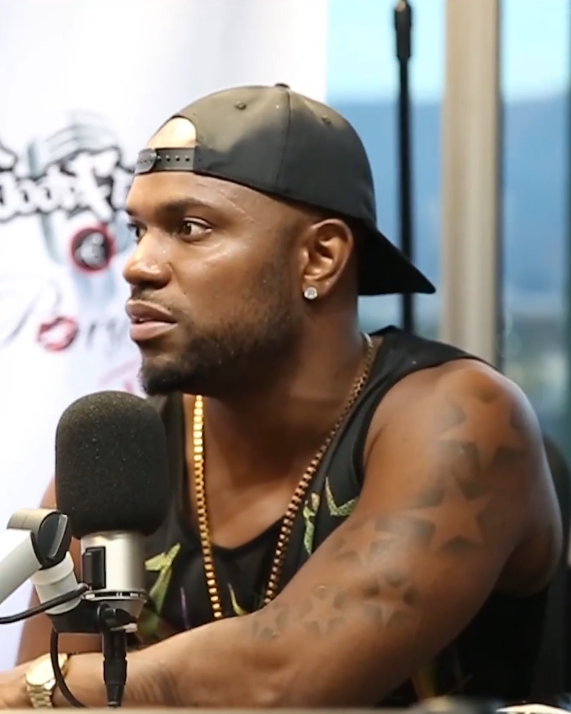
Milan Christopher

- Milan Christopher – rapper, actor, and model known for appearing on season 2 of Love & Hip Hop: Hollywood
- Andy Herren – public speaking professor known for winning season 15 of Big Brother
- George Kotsiopoulos – fashion plate and editor of C magazine who was a panelist on the television show Fashion Police
- Law Roach – stylist with celebrity clientele best known for appearing as a judge on Legendary

=== Television ===
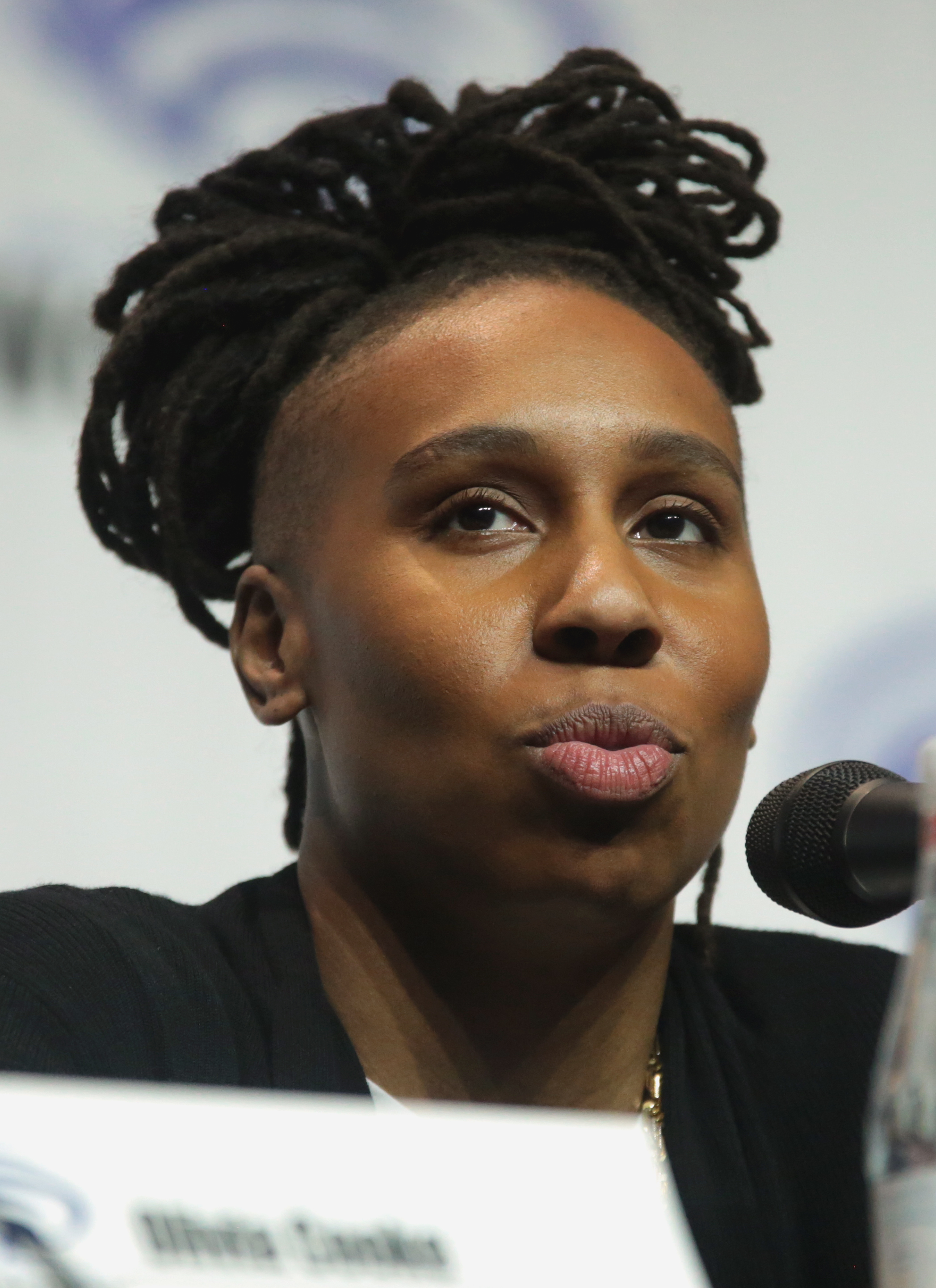
Lena Waithe

- Paris Barclay – television director, producer, and former president of the Directors Guild of America, the first black and openly gay person to hold that role
- Christopher Cantwell – television producer, director, and writer who co-created the show Halt and Catch Fire
- Robert Greenblatt – former chairman of NBC Entertainment, former chairman of WarnerMedia Entertainment, and the first openly gay broadcast television president
- Brittani Nichols – producer, actor, comedian, and writer known for her film Suicide Kale
- Joey Soloway – director, writer, producer, and filmmaker known for their work with the television show Transparent
- Burr Tillstrom – puppeteer and creator of the popular Kukla, Fran, and Ollie television show
- Lena Waithe – television writer, actor, and producer known for her role on Master of None
- Randall Winston – television producer known for Scrubs and Spin City

=== Theater ===
- Claudia Allen – playwright and screenwriter known for her lesbian-themed work, including Hannah Free
- Kevin Bellie – former artistic director of Circle Theatre Chicago
- Sharon Bridgforth – playwright, author, activist, and founder of the root wy'mn theatre company
- David Cerda – playwright and producer who founded Hell in a Handbag Productions
- David Cromer – theater director and actor
- Frank Galati – stage director, professor, playwright, and actor
- E. Patrick Johnson – performance studies professor, actor, and author
- Alvina Krause – Northwestern University professor and theatrical director
- Mark Lamos – stage director, administrator, actor, and writer
- Scott McPherson – playwright and actor
- Tanya Saracho – actor and writer for television and the stage, known for co-founding Teatro Luna, Chicago's first all-Latina theatrical troupe

=== Visual arts ===
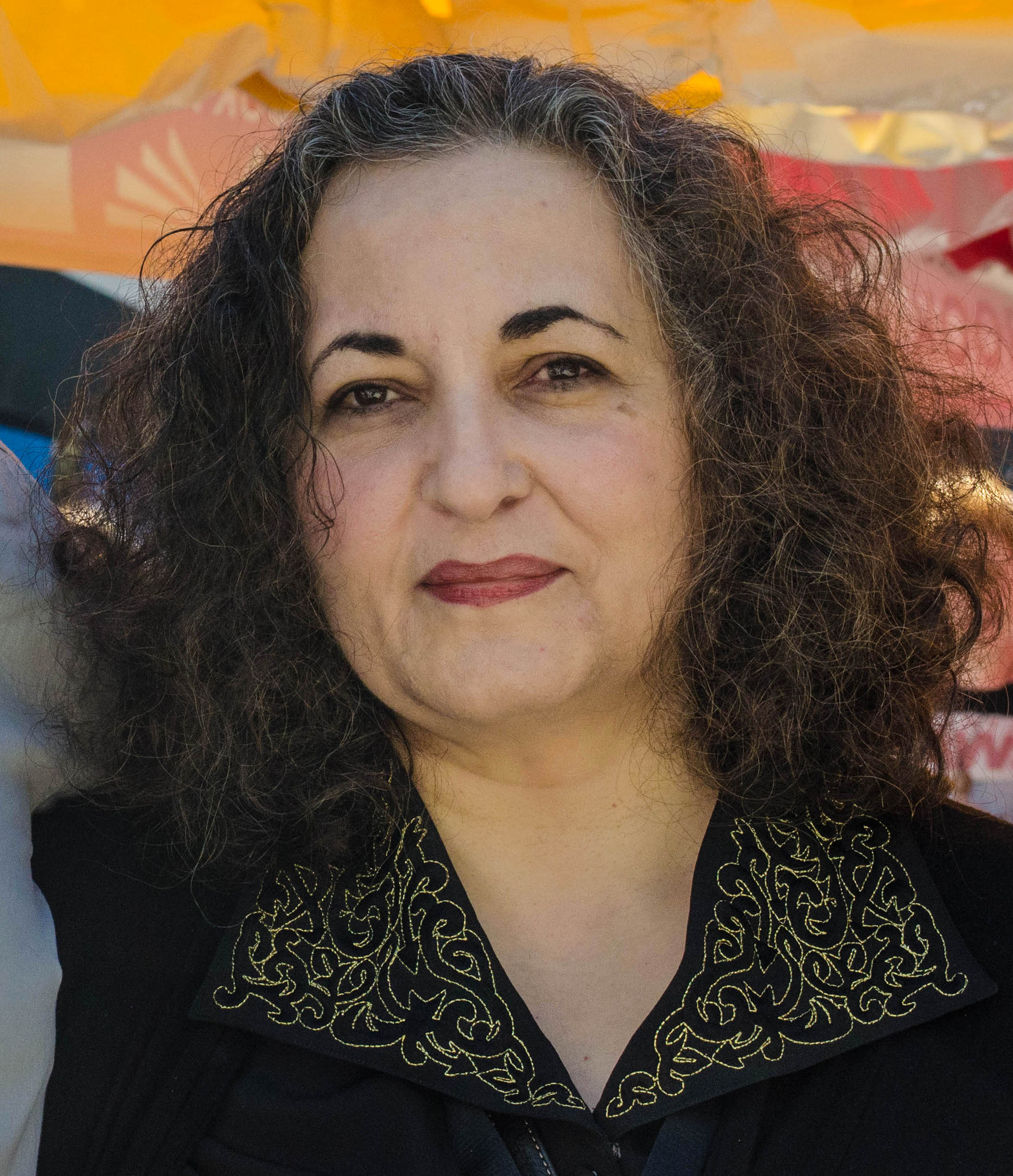
Emil Ferris

- Tom Bachtell – illustrator and caricaturist known for his work with The New Yorker
- Roger Brown – artist and leader in the Chicago Imagist movement
- Edie Fake – alternative comic book author, painter, illustrator, and artist
- Emil Ferris – cartoonist, writer, and artist known for My Favorite Thing Is Monsters
- Harmony Hammond – artist, curator, scholar, and co-founder of A.I.R. Gallery
- Greer Lankton – artist known for her work in the medium of dolls
- Betty G. Miller – artist, deaf advocate, and professor known as the Mother of Deaf View/Image Art
- John Schacht – artist who explored a variety of styles at the edge of Chicago's art scene
- Rupert Kinnard – cartoonist who created the first openly gay African American comic book characters
- Sean – cartoonist and activist known for his illustrated gay erotica

== Business ==
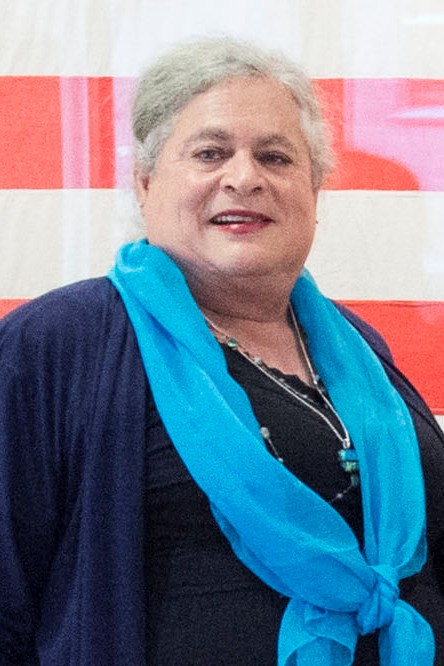
Jennifer Pritzker

- Fred Eychaner – chairman of Newsweb Corporation and philanthropist who supports many LGBT causes in Chicago
- Robert Gottschalk – businessman, camera inventor, and founder of Panavision
- Dema Harshbarger – businesswoman and talent manager
- Jennifer Pritzker – member of the prominent Pritzker family, CEO of TAWANI Enterprises, retired U.S. army colonel, and the world's first transgender billionaire

== Education ==
- John D'Emilio – professor, LGBT historian, writer, and activist
- J. Michael Durnil – president of the Simon Youth Foundation, former senior vice president of the Gay and Lesbian Alliance Against Defamation, and former administrator at Roosevelt University
- Jeannette Howard Foster – librarian, professor, researcher, and pioneer in the study of lesbian literature
- Sarah Hoagland – professor and author
- Tonda L. Hughes – researcher and professor known for contributing to the field of LGBT women's healthcare
- Marie J. Kuda – historian, writer, and publisher of Chicago LGBT culture
- Charles R. Middleton – historian, educator, and the president of Roosevelt University, making him the first openly gay major university president in the country
- Althea Warren – librarian who headed the San Diego Public Library, the Los Angeles Public Library, the California Library Association, and the American Library Association

== Felons ==
- Nicole Abusharif – Villa Park resident convicted of murdering Rebecca Klein, her same-sex domestic partner
- John Wayne Gacy – serial killer and sex offender who sometimes made appearances as "Pogo the Clown" prior to his apprehension, conviction, and execution
- Michelle Kosilek – convicted murderer who unsuccessfully and repeatedly sued the Commonwealth of Massachusetts for sex reassignment surgery

== Philanthropy and nonprofits ==
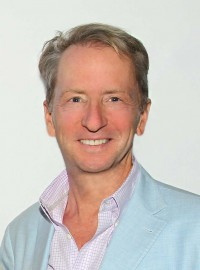
David Bohnett

- Robert Allerton – philanthropist and son of stockyard magnate Samuel W. Allerton who patronized the Art Institute of Chicago and the Honolulu Academy of the Arts and whose name is borne by green spaces in Hawaii and Illinois.
- David Bohnett – philanthropist and founder of GeoCities who has funded many programs for the advancement of LGBT people
- Marty Mann – public health pioneer, founder of the National Council on Alcoholism, and one of the first women to embrace Alcoholics Anonymous
- Laura Ricketts – board member of Lambda Legal and co-owner of the Chicago Cubs
- Mary Rozet Smith – philanthropist and companion of Jane Addams who helped fund Chicago's Hull House

== Politics and law ==
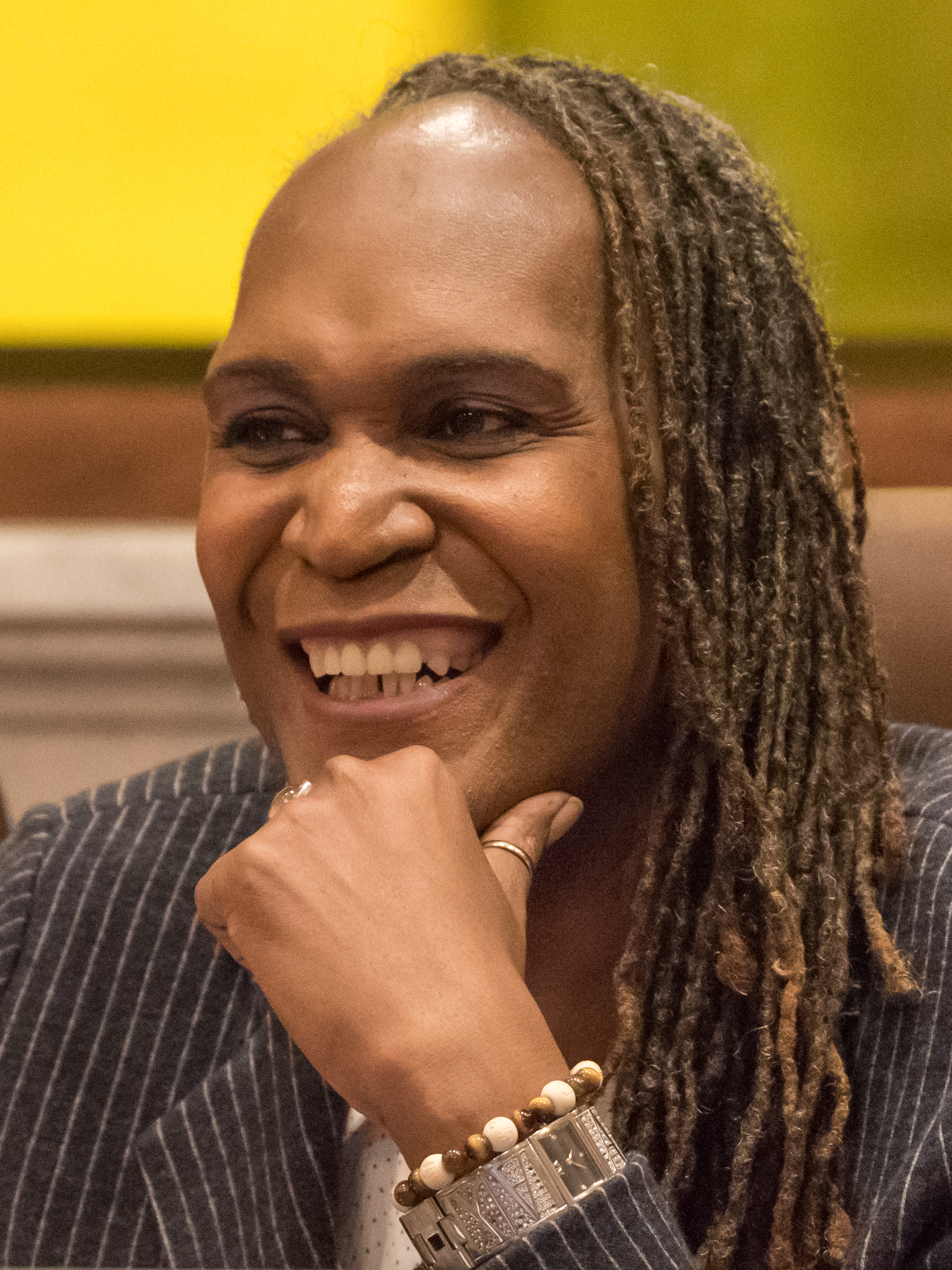
Andrea Jenkins

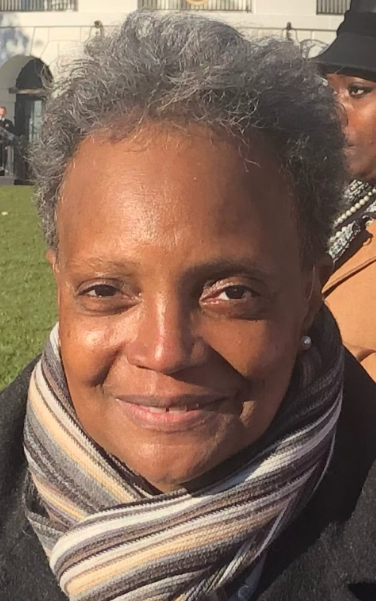
Lori Lightfoot in 2019

- Kelvin Atkinson – former Nevada state Assemblyman, state Senator, and state Senate majority leader who resigned amid a campaign finance scandal that ultimately led to his conviction and imprisonment.
- James Cappleman – politician serving as alderman for Chicago's 46th ward
- Kelly Cassidy – politician and activist who represents the 14th district in the Illinois House of Representatives
- Thomas R. Chiola – former Cook County Circuit Court judge and the first openly gay elected official in Illinois
- Phillipe Cunningham – Minneapolis city councillor among the first openly transgender men to be elected to office in the United States
- Jay Paul Deratany – lawyer, LGBT advocate, filmmaker, and playwright
- Maria Hadden – politician and activist serving as alderman for Chicago's 49th ward, the first openly gay black woman to serve on the city council
- Renee C. Hanover – attorney and LGBT rights activist, believed to be the first openly lesbian lawyer in the United States
- Greg Harris – member of the Illinois House of Representatives and the state's first openly gay House majority leader
- Pearl M. Hart – attorney, activist, professor, and political candidate who focused on defending the rights of children, women, immigrants, and LGBT people
- Patricia Ireland – attorney, activist, and former president of the National Organization for Women
- Lotta Hetler James – civic worker, candidate for governor of California, and community member active in child welfare, women's clubs, and education in Hanford, California
- Andrea Jenkins – politician, performance artist, poet, activist, and former political aide who was elected to the Minneapolis City Council in 2017, making her the first openly transgender black woman to be elected to public office in the United States
- William B. Kelley – lawyer and gay activist
- Jim Kolbe – former United States Representative and second openly gay Republican member of Congress
- Lori Lightfoot – politician and attorney currently who served as the 56th Mayor of Chicago, the first black lesbian person to hold that office
- Raymond Lopez – politician serving as alderman for Chicago's 15th ward
- Larry McKeon – member of the Illinois House of Representatives and gay activist who was the state's first openly gay legislator
- Carlos Ramirez-Rosa – politician and Chicago's first openly gay Latino alderman
- Judith Rice – politician and Cook County Circuit Court judge who previously served as the City Treasurer of Chicago
- Mary M. Rowland – federal judge for the Northern District of Illinois
- Tom Tunney – politician and restaurateur who is the vice mayor of Chicago and an alderman on the Chicago City Council
- Mary Yu – justice on the Washington Supreme Court, the first Asian-American, Latina, and openly gay person to serve on the panel

== Religion ==
- Robert Carter – Jesuit priest and gay rights activist
- Clarence H. Cobbs – head of the spiritualist First Church of Deliverance, Bronzeville community leader, and radio broadcaster

== Science and technology ==
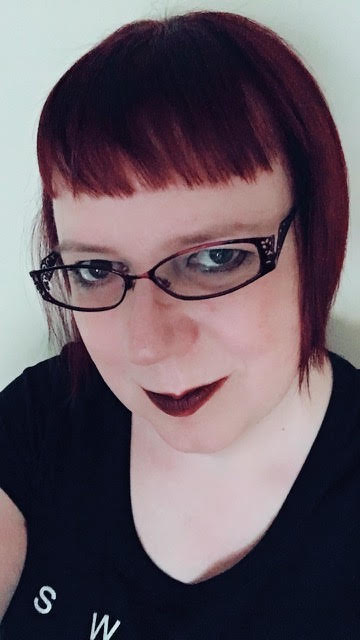
Coraline Ada Ehmke

- Robert Cabaj – psychiatrist, scholar, and author who served as president of the Association of LGBTQ Psychiatrists and the Gay and Lesbian Medical Association
- E. Kitch Childs – clinical psychologist and LGBT rights activist
- Coraline Ada Ehmke – software developer, open source advocate, and writer
- Arlene Halko – medical physicist and gay rights advocate
- Gretchen Kalonji – materials scientist, professor, and academic administrator
- Jessica Mink – astronomer, software developer, and data archivist who works at the Smithsonian Astrophysical Observatory
- Carlos T. Mock – physician, writer, and advocate
- Adrienne J. Smith – psychologist and LGBT rights advocate
- Carl G. Streed – physician, medical professor, researcher, and LGBT advocate

== Sports ==
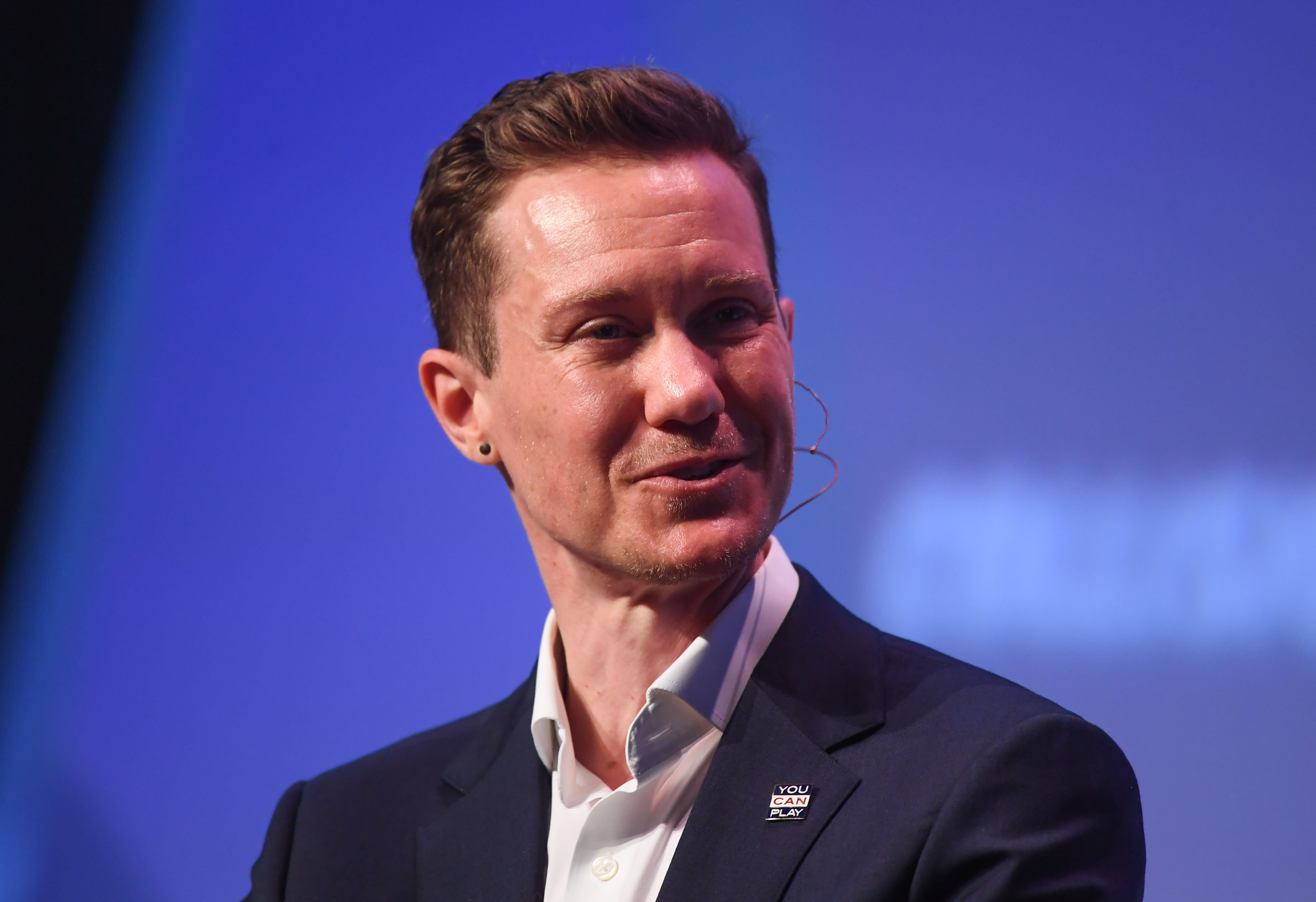
Chris Mosier

- Jason Brown – figure skater who was the 2015 U.S. national champion
- Terry Donahue – professional baseball player who played for the Peoria Redwings
- Robert Dover – equestrian and the first openly gay Olympic athlete
- Fallon Fox – retired mixed martial arts fighter, the first known transgender person to compete in the sport
- Regina George – Nigerian sprinter and Olympic athlete
- Timothy Goebel – former Olympic figure skater and the first person to perform a four-revolution jump in competition
- Hurley Haywood – former race car driver, author, and driving instructor
- Billie Jean King – former professional tennis player and LGBT rights advocate
- David Kopay – former NFL football player who was one of the first professional athletes to come out as gay
- Chris Mosier – triathlete and transgender rights activist
- Judy Sowinski – roller derby skater and coach

== Writers ==
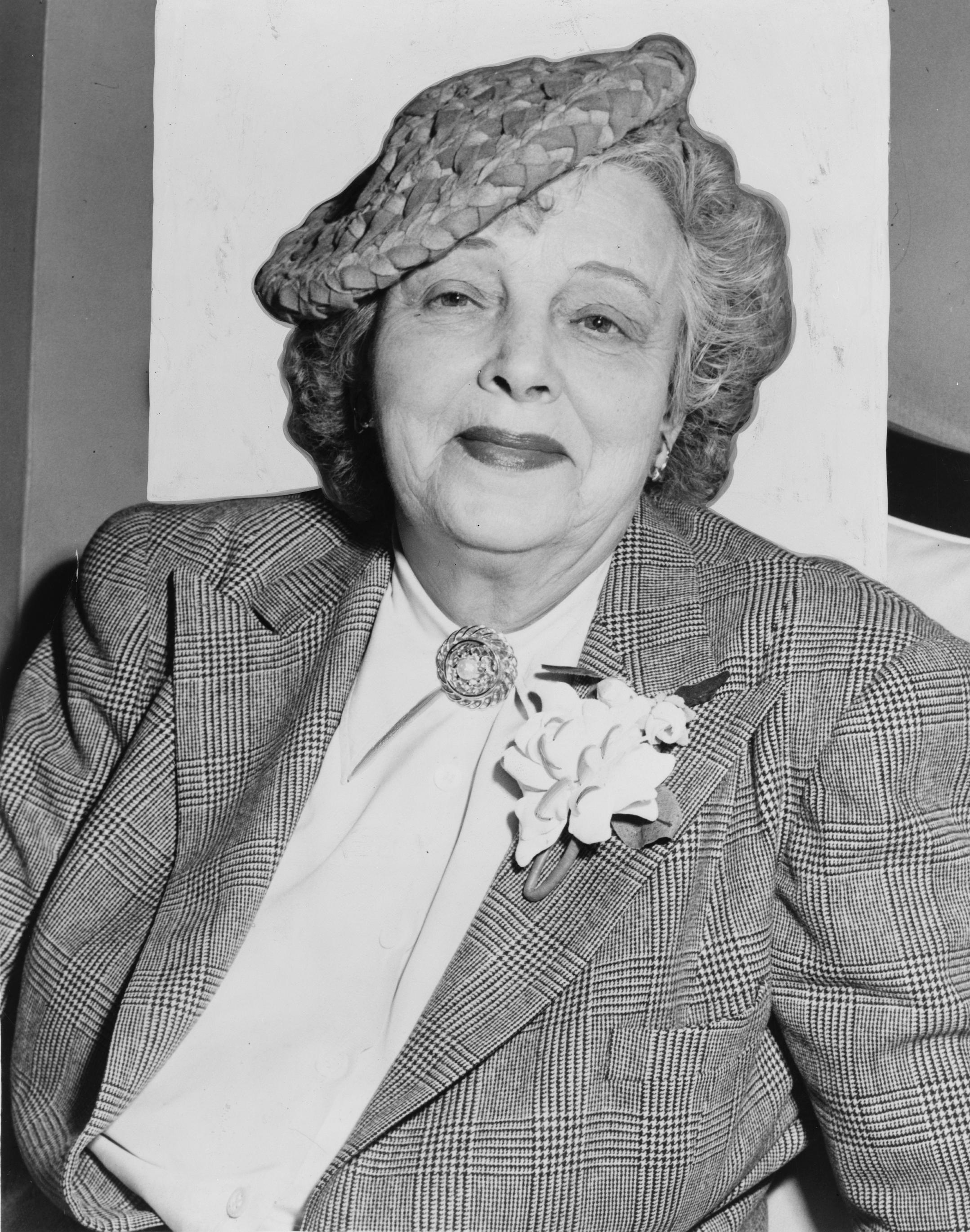
Margaret C. Anderson

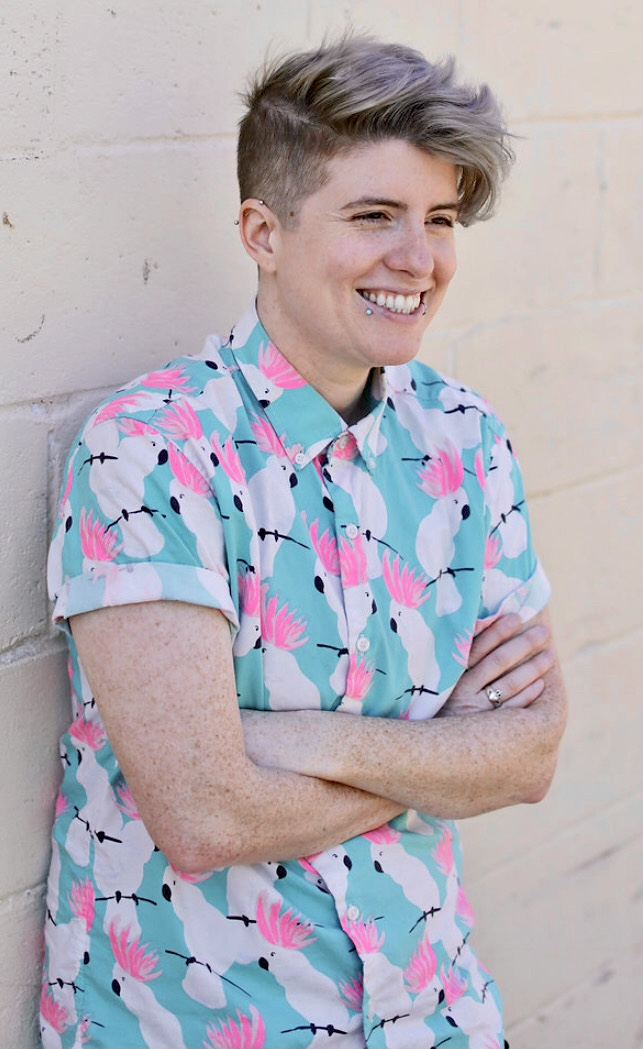
Daniel M. Lavery

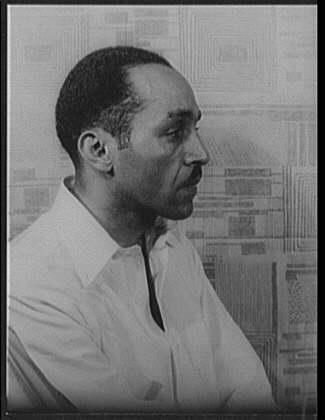
Willard Motley

- Margaret C. Anderson – founder and editor of the literary magazine The Little Review, author, and partner of Jane Heap
- Rane Arroyo – poet, playwright, and creative writing professor at the University of Toledo
- Allen Barnett – author and co-founder of GLAAD who wrote The Body and Its Dangers, a collection of short stories on gay life and the AIDS epidemic
- Jay Bell – writer and author of the Something Like... series
- Barrie Jean Borich – writer known for authoring My Lesbian Husband
- Alice Hastings Bradley – science fiction author who wrote under the pseudonym James Tiptree Jr.
- Marlon Brando – Oscar-winning actor who appeared in The Godfather and A Streetcar Named Desire
- Mike Connolly – columnist for The Hollywood Reporter
- Jon-Henri Damski – writer, columnist, and advocate who documented and reported on LGBT culture in Chicago
- St. Sukie de la Croix – author, columnist, and playwright
- Patrick Dennis – author known for writing Auntie Mame: An Irreverent Escapade
- Henry Blake Fuller – author and short story writer whose controversial Bertram Cope's Year was the first mainstream novel to include a gay relationship
- Judith Palache Gregory – writer, permaculturalist, and educator who served as editor of The Catholic Worker
- David M. Halperin – professor, author, and co-founder of GLQ who wrote One Hundred Years of Homosexuality and Before Pastoral
- Lorraine Hansberry – writer and playwright who penned A Raisin in the Sun, the first Broadway production written by a black woman
- Jane Heap – editor of The Little Review, writer, artist, and partner of Margaret C. Anderson
- Samantha Irby – comedian, blogger, and author of We Are Never Meeting In Real Life and Wow, No Thank You.
- Christina Kahrl – sports journalist and LGBT advocate who co-founded Baseball Prospectus
- Daniel M. Lavery – writer, author, and co-founder of The Toast
- Willard Motley – author and journalist most famous for writing Knock on Any Door
- Ifti Nasim – poet, radio host, and activist whose homosexuality-themed poetry was the first of its kind in the Urdu language
- Achy Obejas – author, poet, journalist, and translator
- Suze Orman – financial advisor and author known for her CNBC show and television appearances
- Andrew Patner – journalist, interviewer, and critic active in print, broadcast, and electronic media
- Torrey Peters – writer, author of Detransition, Baby, and one of the first trans women to be published by a "Big Five" publisher
- Riley Redgate – young adult author of Seven Ways We Lie and Final Draft
- Frank M. Robinson – science fiction writer and friend of Harvey Milk's known for authoring The Dark Beyond the Stars and The Glass Inferno
- Robert Rodi – novelist, comedian, critic, and comic book writer
- Dan Savage – writer and activist known for his sex advice column Savage Love and for creating the It Gets Better Project
- James Schuyler – poet who won a Pulitzer Prize for his 1980 collection The Morning of the Poem
- Randy Shilts – journalist and author whose book And the Band Played On garnered acclaim for documenting the AIDS epidemic
- Valerie Taylor – writer and activist popular for penning lesbian fiction
- Edmund White – novelist, biographer, professor, and critic best known for writing A Boy's Own Story
- Mary Wings – comic book author and illustrator known for Come Out Comix, the first lesbian underground comic

== See also ==
- Chicago LGBT Hall of Fame
