= Aurora University =

Private university in Aurora, Illinois, U.S.

- Former names: Mendota Seminary (1893); Mendota College (1893–1911); Aurora College (1911–1985); George Williams College (1886–2000)
- Motto: Sapientes abscondunt scientiam (Latin)
- Motto in English: Wise persons will carry away knowledge
- Type: Private university
- Established: January 9, 1893; 133 years ago
- President: Susana Rivera-Mills
- Students: 5,923 (fall 2024)
- Undergraduates: 4,106 (fall 2024)
- Postgraduates: 1,817 (fall 2024)
- Location: Aurora, Illinois, U.S.
- Campus: 40 acres (16.2 ha)
- Colors: (Blue and green)
- Nickname: Spartans
- Sporting affiliations: NCAA Division III - NACC; CCIW
- Website: aurora.edu
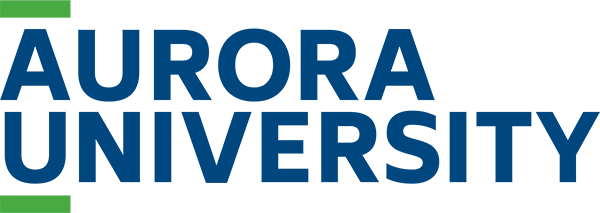

Aurora University (AU) is a private university in Aurora, Illinois, United States. Established in 1893 as a seminary of the Advent Christian Church, the university has been independent since 1971. Approximately 6,200 students are enrolled in the university's undergraduate and graduate programs. It was a women's college from 1893 until 1960.

== History ==
Aurora University was founded as Mendota Seminary in Mendota, Illinois, in 1893. At that time, the school was focused on education and training rooted in the Advent Christian Church. Within a few years of its founding, the seminary changed its name to Mendota College, and broadened its programs into a traditional liberal arts curriculum.

In 1911, residents of the nearby town of Aurora raised funds to construct a new college, led by funding from businessman Charles Eckhart, who founded the predecessor company to the Auburn Automobile Company. Recognizing mutual benefits, administrators of Mendota College moved their operations to Aurora and the school became known as Aurora College. In 1971, Aurora College separated from the Advent Christian Church, and in 1985, changed its name to Aurora University to better reflect the breadth of its academic programs.

In 1992, the school entered into an affiliation agreement with George Williams College in Williams Bay, Wisconsin, which was followed by a full merger in 2000. In November 2022, Aurora University announced plans to end academic use of the campus in 2024 and continue operations as a conference center.

Aurora University added a third location in 2009 with the opening of the Woodstock Center in Woodstock, Illinois. In 2023, the building was sold to McHenry County College. Sociolinguist Susana Rivera-Mills has served as the 14th president of Aurora University since 2023.

== Campus ==
- Aurora College Complex (Eckhart, Davis & Wilkinson Halls)
- U.S. National Register of Historic Places
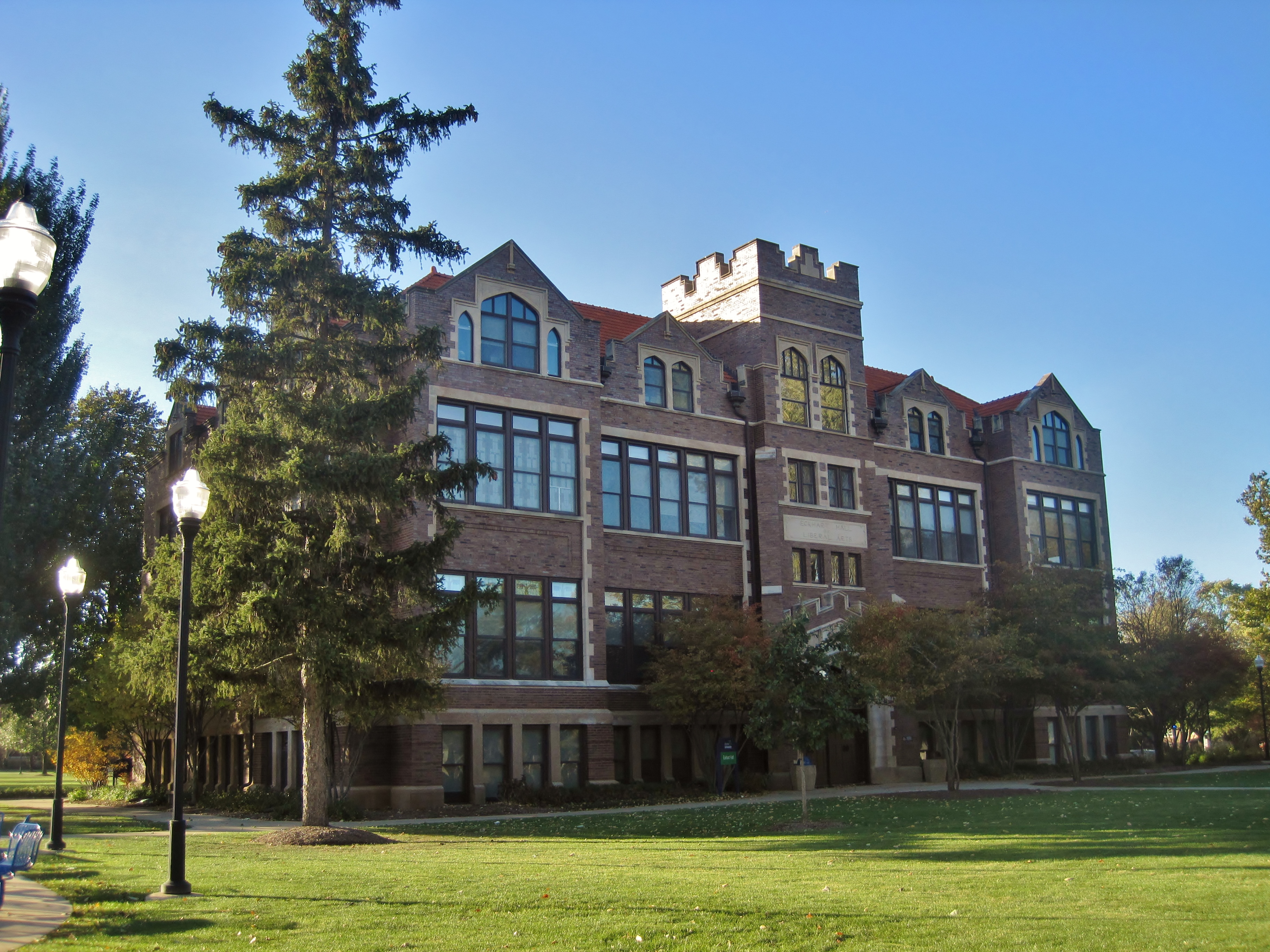
- Eckhart Hall

- Location within Illinois Location within the United States
- Location: 347 S. Gladstone Ave. Aurora, Kane County, Illinois, United States
- Coordinates: 41°45′17″N 88°20′52″W
- Built: 1912
- Architectural style: Tudor Revival
- NRHP reference No.: 84001126
- Added to NRHP: February 16, 1984

The Aurora campus is based primarily around a traditional quadrangle and adjacent areas. In total, the campus is approximately 32 acres. All buildings constructed by the university have red tile roofs (with the exception of two, which continue the red theme on exterior wall panels), a stipulation of Charles Eckhart in his initial donation in the early days of Aurora College.

Buildings include:

- Alumni Hall: Includes the primary student dining hall, the University Banquet Hall, Thornton Gymnasium, athletic training room, athletic offices and a weight room. In 2010, construction began on a new wing for Alumni Hall, which opened in 2011 to house several academic programs and classrooms primarily for athletic training, exercise science, nursing and social work programs.
- Centennial Hall: Houses freshmen and upper-class students in air-conditioned double rooms. The building is co-ed by floor with same-gender, community-style bathrooms located on each floor.
- Davis Hall and Memorial Hall: Originally built in 1912 to house male students, Davis Hall was renovated in 2004. Memorial Hall was built in 1955 as a women-only extension to Davis Hall, and was renovated in 2002. Both buildings are now co-educational residence halls.
- Don and Betty Tucker Hall: Built with universal design in mind to ensure all spaces are sensory friendly. Each floor is co-ed by room and has 6 single-user restrooms for a semiprivate bathroom. Tucker Hall is also home to the Betty Parke Tucker Center for Neurodiversity, which is home to AU's Pathways Program for college-capable students with autism spectrum disorder.
- Dunham Hall: Includes the university bookstore, Dunham School of Business, and classrooms.
- Eckhart Hall: Includes central administration functions, classroom space and Lowry Chapel. Along with Davis Hall and Wilkinson Hall, Eckhart was one of the three original buildings of Aurora College.
- Ellsworth and Virginia Hill Welcome Center and Schingoethe Center: The Center serves as a gathering place for campus and community functions. It features a small library, dining room, and Ethel Tapper Recital Hall, an 80-seat performance space. It is also home to the Schingoethe Center Museum.
- The Institute for Collaboration: Includes classrooms, the Caterpillar Center for Teaching and Learning, and the 500-seat Crimi Auditorium, which includes a pipe organ that was dedicated in 2010. The institute also houses the Scott Center for Online and Graduate Studies, which opened in 2023.
- Jenks Hall: Built in 1957, Jenks Hall is a residence hall for freshmen and upperclassmen, and also includes the university fitness center and wellness center.
- John C. Dunham Hall: Formerly the STEM Partnership School, John C. Dunham Hall includes classrooms, study spaces and updated labs for the School of Health and Sciences. The building was awarded Leadership in Energy Environmental Design (LEED) Platinum Certification by the U.S. Green Building Council.
- Kimberly and James Hill Center for Student Success: The Hill Center includes study spaces, a large classroom, and the Career Services department.
- Parolini Music Center: Named for alumni and supporters Roger and Marilyn Parolini, the facility includes a music ensemble room, art studio, two teaching studios and music practice rooms.
- Phillips Library: Built in 1962, the library's collection includes more than 99,000 books and 7,000 multimedia materials. The building includes a computer lab, the Center for Teaching & Learning and study rooms.
- Stephens Hall: Houses the Fox River Valley Center for Community Enrichment, Perry Theatre, and the “Spartan Spot” student commons area.
- Wackerlin Center for Faith and Action: Located in a restored modern home designed by the architecture firm Keck and Keck, the Wackerlin Center is the hub for campus ministries, community service and leadership studies.
- Watkins Hall: Watkins Hall houses freshmen and upperclassmen in air-conditioned double rooms and suites. The building is co-ed by wing, with same-gender, community-style bathrooms located on each floor.
- Wilkinson Hall: One of the original residence halls on campus, Wilkinson Hall was built in 1912 and houses upperclassmen.

=== Schingoethe Center of Aurora University ===
Aurora University is home to the Schingoethe Center of Aurora University, a museum best known for its collection of Native American artifacts. The museum was founded when Herbert and Martha Schingoethe commissioned the building of Dunham Hall, which opened to the public in 1990 and which housed their donated collection of 6000 artifacts.

In 2015, the museum relocated to the newly constructed Ellsworth and Virginia Hill Welcome Center. The Schingoethe Center was named as a Smithsonian affiliate in 2017.

== Academics ==
Academic rankings

National
- U.S. News & World Report: 273
- Washington Monthly: 272

Aurora University offers 60 undergraduate majors and minors, a wide variety of master's degrees, several graduate certificates in education and social work, and online doctoral degrees in education and social work. The university is composed of the following colleges and schools:

- College of Education and Social Work
  - School of Education
  - George Williams School of Social Work
- College of Health and Sciences
  - School of Health Sciences
  - School of Natural Sciences, Technology, and Math
- College of Liberal Arts and Business
  - Dunham School of Business
  - School of Humanities
  - School of Social and Behavioral Sciences
- School of Nursing

The university states that its student-faculty ratio is 18:1 and that the average class size is 26 students. Aurora University operates on a semester-based academic year. It offers an international- and service-focused “Travel in May” program at the conclusion of the spring semester.

Aurora University also offers programming to support college-capable students with autism spectrum disorder through the Pathways program. The first class Pathways Collegiate Program freshmen and transfer students started in the 2022–23 academic year.

The Higher Learning Commission accredits Aurora University at the bachelor's, master's and doctoral levels. The Certified Alcohol and Drug Counselor training program is accredited by the Illinois Certification Board.

== Athletics ==
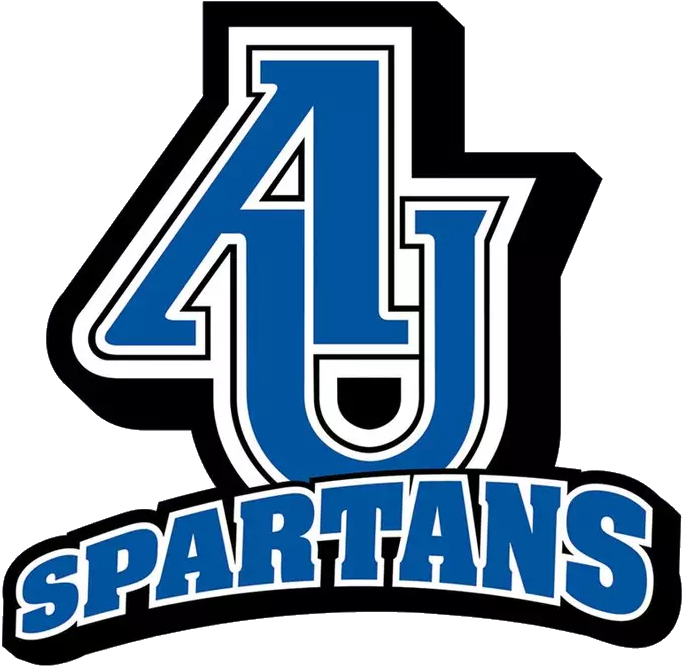
Aurora Spartans logo

The Aurora athletic teams are called the Spartans. The university is a member of the Division III level of the National Collegiate Athletic Association (NCAA), primarily competing in the Northern Athletics Collegiate Conference (NACC; formerly known as the Northern Athletics Conference (NAC) until after the 2012–13 school year) since the 2006–07 academic year; while its men's and women's hockey teams compete in the Northern Collegiate Hockey Association (NCHA) and men's and women's wrestling and women's bowling teams compete in the College Conference of Illinois and Wisconsin (CCIW). The Spartans previously competing in the D-III Northern Illinois-Iowa Conference (NIIC) from 1995–96 to 2005–06; and in the Chicagoland Collegiate Athletic Conference (CCAC) of the National Association of Intercollegiate Athletics (NAIA) as an associate member from 1954–55 to 1959–60.

Aurora competes in 24 intercollegiate varsity sports: Men's sports include baseball, basketball, cross country, football, golf, ice hockey, lacrosse, soccer, track and field (indoor and outdoor), volleyball and wrestling; while women's sports include basketball, bowling, cross country, golf, ice hockey, lacrosse, soccer, softball, track and field (indoor and outdoor), volleyball and wrestling. Club sports include women's cheer and dance, men's ice hockey and women's ice hockey.

The home athletics facilities are Thornton Gymnasium, Spartan Athletic Park, Stuart Sports Complex, Fox Valley Ice Arena, Oakhurst Forest Preserve, Aurora Country Club, and Vago Field. The Vago Field grandstand seats 600 people while Spartan Athletic Park seats 1,150. Spartan Athletic Park is located less than a mile from the main campus in Aurora. "The complex houses...venues for football, lacrosse, soccer, and softball as well as a multipurpose indoor facility with [a] wrestling room and [a] weight room."

Aurora University athletic teams have captured 209 conference championships in school history. Since joining the NCAA in 1982, AU men's and women's teams have won 186 conference championships and appeared in 171 NCAA tournaments.

== Notable alumni ==
- Donald Lippold, member of the Iowa House of Representatives
- Shannon Downey, crafter and activist
- Everett M. Gilmore, tubist
- Lyle Gramley, member of the Federal Reserve Board of Governors
- Barbara Hernandez, member of the Illinois House of Representatives
- Norma Hernandez, member of the Illinois House of Representatives
- Brandon Johnson, 57th Mayor of Chicago
- Mickey Johnson, former professional basketball player
- Rihards Marenis, professional ice hockey player
- Robert Mitchler, member of the Illinois Senate
- Dušan Nedić, professional basketball coach and former player
- Scott B. Palmer, former chief of staff to former Speaker of the House Dennis Hastert
- Chris Roycroft, professional baseball pitcher
- Karina Villa, member of the Illinois Senate
- Tom Weisner, mayor of Aurora, Illinois
