= Take Me to the Top =

Take Me to the Top may refer to:

- "Take Me to the Top", a single from the 1981 album Get Lucky by Loverboy
- "Take Me to the Top", a song from the 1981 album Too Fast for Love by Mötley Crüe
- "Take Me to the Top", a song from the 1986 album The Doctor by Cheap Trick
- "Take Me to the Top", a song from the 1996 album Super Eurobeat Vol. 68 by D. Essex
- "Take Me to the Top", a song from the 2015 album 35xxxv by One Ok Rock
- "Take Me To The Top (Of Your Mountain)", a single from the 1979 album Love City by Ronn Matlock
- "High Up (Take Me to the Top)", a 2015 single by Peter Bjorn and John
