= Trevor Hoppe =

American sociology professor

Trevor Hoppe is an American professor of sociology. He is the author of Punishing Disease: HIV and the Criminalization of Sickness (2018), and co-editor of The War on Sex (2017, with David Halperin) and Unsafe Words: Queering Consent in the #MeToo Era (2023, with Shantel Buggs). Punishing Disease won the American Sociological Association's Sociology of Sexualities Distinguished Book Award and Lambda Literary's LGBTQ Studies award.
