= Tina Passman =

American classical scholar

- Born: Kristina M. Passman
- Citizenship: American
- Known for: Co-chair of the Lambda Classical Caucus
- Awards: Outstanding Faculty Award (2011)

Academic background
- Education: University of Iowa (BA, MA, PhD)

Academic work
- Discipline: Classics, Classical Language and Literature
- Institutions: University of Maine

Tina Passman is an American classical scholar, who is Emeritus Associate Professor of Classical Language and Literature at the University of Maine. Alongside David Halperin, Passman was one of the first co-chairs of the Lesbian and Gay Classical Caucus, now Lambda Classical Caucus, which was founded in 1989. She studied for her BA, MA and PhD in Classics at the University of Iowa. Her research interests include women in the ancient world, multiculturalism, community building and inclusion. She pioneered online teaching and the adoption of universal design in her field.

Passman has voiced interpretations that recognized a "patriarchal voice" in the Homeric Hymn to Demeter. In 1993 her article "Out of the Closet and into the Field: Matriculture, the Lesbian Perspective, and Feminist Classics" was published which discussed the neglect of America's first woman classicist, Jane Harrison, and tied that neglect to an unpopularity of lesbian perspectives in the field. However, her perspectives on both matriarchy and Jane Harrison were challenged in by Simon Goldhill who described her views as "uncritical".

== Awards ==
- 2011 Outstanding Faculty Award - College of Liberal Arts and Sciences at the University of Maine.

== Selected publications ==
- Passman, Tina, and Ravonne A. Green. "Start with the syllabus: Universal design from the top." Journal of Access Services 6.1-2 (2009): 48–58.
- Passman, Tina, "Out of the Closet and into the Field: Matriculture, the Lesbian Perspective, and Feminist Classics", in Nancy Sorkin Rabinowitz, Amy Richlin, Feminist Theory and the Classics. Thinking gender. London: Routledge, 1993.
- Tina Passman, “Re (de)fining Woman: Language and Power in the Homeric Hymn to Demeter,” in Woman’s Power, Man’s Game: Essays on Classical Antiquity in Honor of Joy K. King edited by Mary De Forest, Wauconda, IL: Bolchazy-Carducci Publishers (1993) 54–77.
- Passman, Kristina M. "The Classical Amazon in Contemporary Cinema." The Bucknell Review 35.1 (1991): 81.
