= Ragneron =

Ragneron is a fictional comic book character designed to be the first openly gay black male superhero, first conceived by openly gay music artist and actor Milan Christopher. The comic is written by Christopher and illustrated by artist Michael Luster. Ragneron first appeared in the comic miniseries Ragneron, which saw its first publication on April 25, 2019.

== Description ==
Ragneron's alter-ego is Chris Smith, an openly gay fitness instructor. Smith received his superpowers after he was given powers by a galactic crystal that he touched after it fell from outer space to earth. After his transformation, the United States government sought him out due to the powers bestowed on him from the crystal. Subsequently, Algor, his nemesis, began to hunt for him as well as those who came into contact with the evil crystal.

Ragneron's superpowers include the ability of super-strength, subatomic manipulation and perception, and unlimited manipulation of matter and atoms.

== Conception ==
Ragneron was designed and created as a dedication to teen suicide victim Nigel Shelby, who committed suicide after being bullied in school.

Milan seeks to provide readers with thought provoking storylines, aiming to provide the reader with material to contemplate the moral and ethical questions behind homosexuality.

== Ragneron the Movie ==
Ragneron - The Guardian of the Crystal, a live action short based on Ragneron The Comic Book, debuted November 19, 2019 on Mctv Streaming Network. It stars Christopher, Trevor Bell, Lola Monroe, and others.
