= The War on Sex =

2017 sociology book

- Author: David M. Halperin and Trevor Hoppe
- Publisher: Duke University Press
- Publication date: 2017
- Pages: 512
- ISBN: 978-0822363514

The War on Sex is a sociology book edited by University of Michigan professor David M. Halperin and SUNY Albany professor Trevor Hoppe, published by Duke University Press in 2017.

The book examines, across 17 academic essays, the rise of sexual surveillance in the United States starting in the 1970s, the criminalization of HIV, the development of sex offenders as a criminal category as well as their registration by the hundreds of thousands, the persecution of sex workers by self-proclaimed anti-sex trafficking NGOs, and sex panics related to children and satanism in American society.
