= Susana Rivera-Mills =

Salvadoran sociolinguist and academic administrator

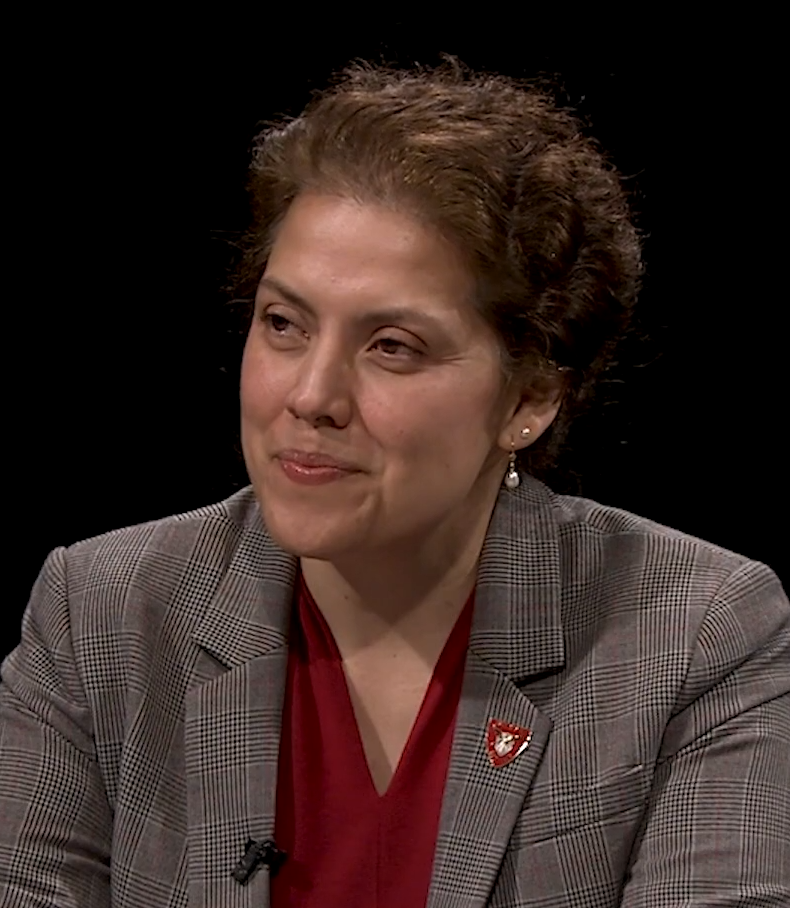
- Rivera-Mills in 2019

14th President of Aurora University
- Incumbent
- Assumed office June 1, 2023
- Preceded by: Rebecca L. Sherrick

Personal details
- Born: San Salvador, El Salvador
- Education: University of Iowa; University of New Mexico

Susana Victoria Rivera-Mills is a Salvadoran sociolinguist and academic administrator serving as the president of Aurora University since 2023.

== Life ==
Rivera-Mills was born and raised in San Salvador. Her mother stayed at home and her father owned a construction and trucking business. She attended a girls Catholic school. In 1982, at the age of twelve, her family immigrated to San Francisco and later to Eureka, California. She attended Humboldt State University before transferring to University of Iowa where she earned a B.A. (1991) in Spanish and a M.A. (1993) in Spanish linguistics. She completed a Ph.D. in Romance languages at the University of New Mexico in 1998. Her dissertation was titled, Language Use, Proficiency, and Attitudes Among Hispanics in a Northern California Community. Garland D. Bills was her dissertation director.

Rivera-Mills' researched Latino communities, sociolinguistics, and Spanish language and culture. She was a faculty member at Northern Arizona University for 12 years. She joined Oregon State University as chair of the department of modern languages. She also served as executive associate dean of the liberal arts college, dean of undergraduate studies, and vice provost of academic programs and learning innovation from 2007 to 2018. In July 2018, Rivera-Mills became the provost and executive vice president of academic affairs at Ball State University. On June 1, 2023, she became the 14th president of Aurora University, succeeding Rebecca L. Sherrick. She is the first Latina in the position.

== Selected works ==
- Rivera-Mills, Susana Victoria (2000). New Perspectives on Current Sociolinguistic Knowledge with Regard to Language Use, Proficiency, and Attitudes Among Hispanics in the U.S.: The Case of a Rural Northern California Community. E. Mellen Press. ISBN 978-0-7734-7906-7.
- Rivera-Mills, Susana Victoria; Trujillo, Juan Antonio, eds. (2010). Building Communities and Making Connections. Cambridge Scholars. ISBN 978-1-4438-1957-2.
- Moyna, María Irene; Rivera-Mills, Susana Victoria, eds. (2016). Forms of Address in the Spanish of the Americas. John Benjamins Publishing Company. ISBN 978-90-272-5809-0.
