= Keith Barrow =

American singer songwriter (1954–1983)

- Barrow in 1979

Background information
- Born: Keith Errol Barrow; September 27, 1954; Chicago, Illinois, U.S.
- Died: October 22, 1983 (aged 29) Chicago, Illinois, U.S.
- Genres: Disco; Soul; Funk; R&B
- Occupation: Singer songwriter
- Instrument: Vocals
- Years active: 1976–83
- Labels: Columbia; CBS; Capitol

Keith Errol Barrow (September 27, 1954 – October 22, 1983) was an American disco/soul singer and songwriter born and raised in Chicago. He was most known for being the son of civil rights activist and minister Reverend Willie Taplin Barrow.

== Background ==
=== Early life and family ===
Barrow was born in Chicago and had a gospel singing background. He was the only child of his civil rights and human activist mother Rev. Willie Barrow, who was known as "The High Priestess of Protest", and served the National Executive Director and chairman of the board of The Rainbow of Rev. Jesse Jackson's Push Organization/Coalition and Clyde Barrow, a welder. His mother would also become part of the gay-rights movement after Barrow revealed his sexuality to her. Barrow's first singing experience was in gospel music, as befitting the son of the famous Chicago minister. In his teens, Barrow headed a gospel group called the Soul Shakers.

=== Career ===
Leaving Chicago for New York City and soon after Los Angeles, Barrow signed with Columbia Records/CBS around 1976. Barrow's self-penned song, "Teach Me (It's Something About Love)", was a charting single for Blue Magic in 1976. It was taken from the band's fourth studio album Mystic Dragons, and charted at No. 48 on the Billboard R&B chart. Barrow released his self-titled debut album, produced by MFSB guitarist/songwriter Bobby Eli, in the summer of 1977. His debut single from the album, "Precious", had little success, like the album, although the second and final single, "Mr. Magic Man", received some attention. For the album, Barrow recorded his own version of "Teach Me (It's Something About Love)". Afterwards he soon worked on his second album with producer Michael Stokes. Released in 1978, the album was titled Physical Attraction. Barrow's biggest hit and signature tune was "You Know You Want to be Loved" which went to No. 26 R&B on Billboard's chart in summer 1978. This track, along with several others on the album, was penned by the songwriter Ronn Matlock. The song "Turn Me Up" also reached the charts the following year and remains a favorite among dancefloor aficionados, reaching No. 79 on the R&B chart in early 1979. The title track "Physical Attraction" was another disco hit from the album, and the track "If Its Love That You're Looking For" was also issued as a single.

In the summer of 1979, Barrow felt too ill to perform on stage in Paris. Feeling unwell, he called his mother in America and was taken to a local hospital. Despite the major setback of what was revealed to be HIV/AIDS, Barrow switched over to the Capitol Records label where recorded and released his third and final studio album, Just As I Am in 1980 before his health began to decline. The album featured the sole single "Why Love Half The World (When You Can Love The Whole World)".

=== Illness and death ===
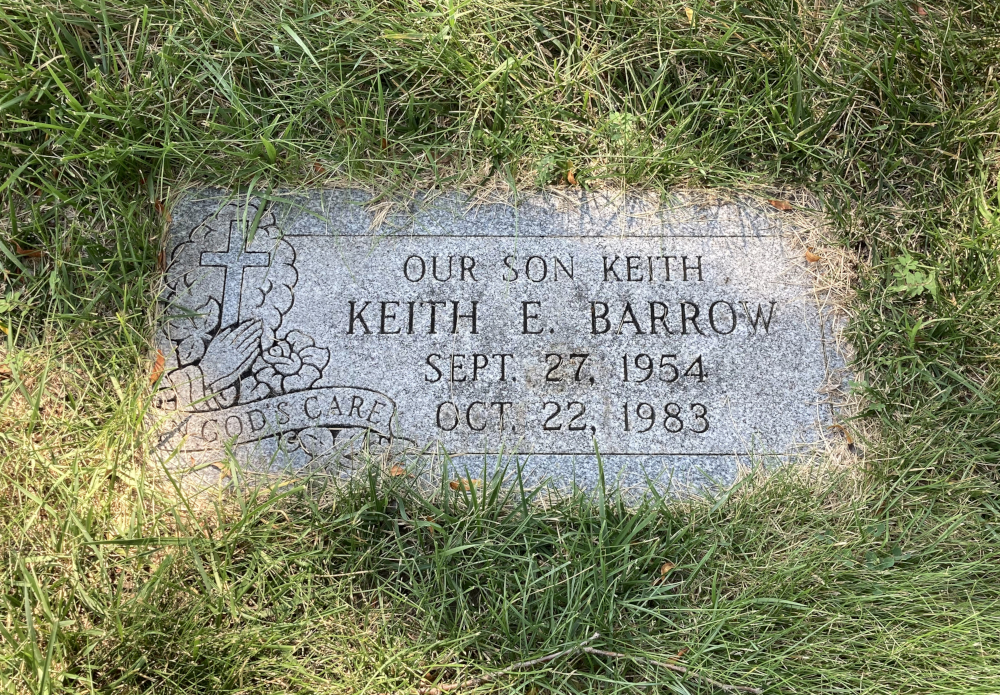
Barrow's grave at Oak Woods Cemetery

He returned to Chicago from New York in June 1983, and was looked after by his mother, before being admitted to the Michael Reese Hospital, where he was diagnosed with AIDS. Barrow died of AIDS-related complications on October 22, 1983, at the age of 29. He was one of the disease's early victims. African American newspapers never mentioned the cause of his death. More than 1,100 people attended Barrow's memorial service at the Operation PUSH's Auditorium in Chicago.

He was buried at Oak Woods Cemetery.

== Discography ==
=== Albums ===
- 1977: Keith Barrow
- 1978: Physical Attraction
- 1980: Just As I Am

=== Singles ===
- 1976: "Precious"
- 1977: "Mr. Magic Man"
- 1978: "You Know You Wanna Be Loved"
- 1978: "Turn Me Up"
- 1978: "If Its Love That You're Looking For"
- 1978: "Physical Attraction"
- 1980: "Why Love Half the World (When You Can Love the Whole World)"
