= Willie Barrow =

American civil rights activist and minister

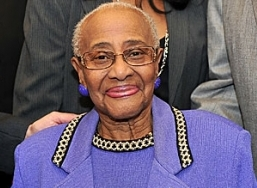
- Barrow in 2012
- Born: Willie Beatrice Taplin; December 7, 1924 (Note: Some sources list December 7, 1924 as her birth date, though others cite December 17, 1924.); Burton, Texas, U.S.
- Died: March 12, 2015 (aged 90); Chicago, Illinois, U.S.
- Resting place: Oak Woods Cemetery, Chicago, Illinois
- Other names: Willie B. Taplin Barrow; Little Warrior; Princess of Protest; The High Priestess of Protest
- Education: Warner Pacific Theological Seminary; Moody Bible Institute; Central Conservatory of Music; University of Monrovia
- Occupation: Minister
- Years active: 1935–2015
- Organization(s): Rainbow/PUSH; Chicago, Illinois
- Known for: Civil rights activism, Operation PUSH leadership
- Notable work: How to Get Married and Stay Married (book; 2004)
- Spouse: Clyde Barrow (m. 1945; died 1998)
- Children: Keith Barrow

Willie Beatrice Barrow (née Taplin; December 7, 1924 – March 12, 2015) was an American civil rights activist and minister. She was the co-founder of Operation PUSH, which was named Operation Breadbasket at the time of its creation alongside Rev. Jesse Jackson. In 1984, Barrow became the first woman executive director of a civil rights organization, serving as Push's CEO. Barrow was the godmother of President Barack Obama.

== Biography ==
Willie Beatrice Taplin was born on December 7, 1924, in Burton, Texas, to Nelson, a minister, and Octavia Taplin. She had six siblings. At age 12, Taplin organized a demonstration with fellow students to protest that white students were allowed to ride the bus, but black students had to walk to school. She confronted the bus driver and demanded that he let her fellow students ride. When the bus driver confronted her about it, Taplin said: "Y'all can kill me if you want to. But I'm tired." When she turned 16, Taplin moved to Portland, Oregon, to study at the Warner Pacific Theological Seminary (now Warner Pacific College). While still a student, she and a group of black residents helped build one of the first black Churches of God in the city; Taplin was ordained as a minister after graduation. She started working as a welder during World War II at the Swan Island Shipyard, where she met Clyde Barrow, and they got married in 1945 in Washington.

The couple moved to Chicago in the early 1940s, and Barrow attended the Moody Bible Institute to further her call to service. They lived on the South Side, and Barrow ran the youth choir at Langley Avenue Church of God. According to Barrow, she was approached by the minister to do some additional organizing for civil rights movement actions. Barrow campaigned for Harold Washington who became the first Black Mayor of Chicago in 1983. In 1984 and 1988, she worked for Jesse Jackson's presidential campaign.

== Awards and achievements ==
- 2014 Champion of Freedom Award
- 2012 Bill Berry Award
- Woman of the Year of Chicago 1969
- Image award from League of Black Women
- Christian Women's Conference History Makers Award
- Doctor of Divinity Degree from Monrovia.
- Libreria and Leadership Certificate from Harvard University
- Indo-American Democratic Organization's Humanitarian of the Year Award
- C.F. Stradford Award for her lifelong work on the front lines of the civil rights movement.
- 2006 Black Heritage Awardee

== Organizing ==
In the 1950s, Barrow worked with Martin Luther King Jr. and other Chicago ministers and activists as a field organizer for the Southern Christian Leadership Conference. In the 1960s, she helped organize the Chicago chapter of Operation Breadbasket with Rev. Jesse Jackson. Barrow opposed U.S. involvement in the Vietnam War and led a delegation to North Vietnam in 1968. She joined the National Urban League in 1943 and the National Council of Negro Women two years later. Barrow was the godmother of President Barack Obama. In 1973, she protested social services cuts by the Nixon administration.

=== Intersectional activism ===
Barrow additionally was an activist for the LGBT community, which included fighting for HIV/AIDS victims. She also advocated for fair labor practices, took an anti-Vietnam war stance, and was vocal about women's rights. In a 1987 interview on Chicago Tonight, Barrow said: "You see ministers, they would rather have a minister who could not articulate and perhaps may not have even been called ... than to have an articulate woman that knows something about the rebirth of Christ and knows about the natural birth and the new birth. They would rather try to have a man articulate than a woman. ... As Jesse [Jackson] grew, his vision grew. Anytime that there was a committee was formed, it would be all men. I'd say 'Jesse, you haven an unbalanced committee. You've got to have some women.' ... He kept putting women on committees, kept making them managers ... then it became a habit, a part of his vision."

== Significant events attended ==
- 1963 March on Washington
- Bloody Sunday (1965)
- Barrow participated in the Project AIDS Memorial Quilt as acknowledged by The President and First Lady.
- State of Illinois Center against the school strike on September 22, 1987
- Democratic National Convention in Denver on August 26, 2008 as a superdelegate
- 2001 March against U.S. Naval bombing in Vieques, Puerto Rico
- Million Family March
- Barrow spoke on January 6, 1994, at a Violence Against Women forum. Her stance was that it starts within the family and crosses racial boundaries and financial boundaries.

== Later years and death ==
Each Saturday, Barrow would participate in demonstrations and she participated weekly in Rainbow/PUSH's events. She helped many people by writing checks to cover college tuition for them. Barrow mentored over a hundred people in PUSH, helping them to move on to the next stage of the movement. She was co-pastor of the Vernon Park Church of God in Chicago and helped raise money for assisted living development in the south and to fund after school programs. Barrow had focused on gun violence in Chicago and changes to the Voting Rights Act that were taking away rights that the Selma marches helped create.

Barrow died of respiratory failure on March 12, 2015, at age 90 in Chicago. Following her death, a tribute to her life was held at Operation PUSH headquarters, and her funeral was held at her church, Vernon Park Church of God.
