= Milan Christopher =

American rapper and actor

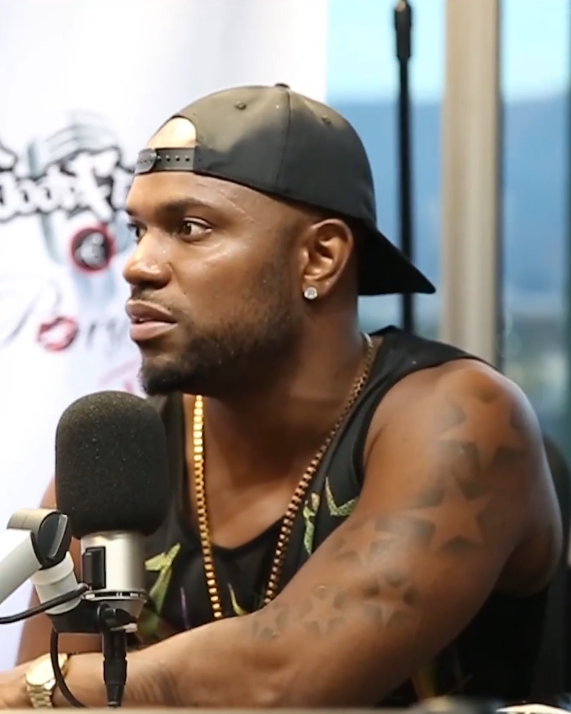
- Christopher in 2018
- Occupations: Rapper; actor; model; businessman
- Musical career
- Genre: Hip hop
- Instrument: Vocals

Milan Christopher is an American rapper and actor, best known for his supporting role on VH1's Love & Hip Hop: Hollywood.

== Career ==
=== Music ===
Born on the south side of Chicago (77th & Hermitage), Christopher moved to Los Angeles in the summer of 2008 to pursue his rapping/producing & modeling career.

After working with Beyoncé on the music video "Haunted," Christopher released his EDM rap single "Burning Up" under the music management of D-tech A.R. of Akon's Konvicts Musiq Label.

In mid-2016, Christopher released his album The Alpha and a controversial visual for his single "When I Go" based on domestic violence, bullying, and LGBT suicide rates. This music video caused Christopher to be featured on the cover of Los Angeles Times, as well as coverage in many publications and blogs. The music video won him the Gentleman of Artistry award at the 2016 Gentlemen's Ball, and a personal thank-you letter from California State Senator Isadore Hall III.

=== Acting ===
Christopher appeared in a supporting role in the second season of the reality show Love & Hip Hop: Hollywood on VH1 as the first openly gay male on the channel's reality shows. As a result of this role, in 2016, Christopher was featured on the cover of the Los Angeles Times and on the nationally syndicated Wendy Williams Show. Christopher has also appeared on TV shows such as Nip/Tuck and was also featured as a guest on The Doctors, and 12 Corozones, as well as commercials for brands like Red Bull, Chase Bank, and Virgin Mobile. Christopher has also appeared in music videos with Kanye West, The Game, Lil Wayne, Teyana Taylor, and Ne-Yo. Milan stars in his own television series titled Ragneron the Guardian of the Crystal. It is based on his comic book series. In February 2022, Milan Christopher starred in Bad Boys Los Angeles. Milan Christopher is now the executive producer of Bad Boys Atlanta on his own network, Mctv Streaming Network.

=== Other ventures ===
Christopher's brand includes modeling, teeth-whitening facilities, and a line of underwear. In June 2017, Christopher appeared in a nude photoshoot for Paper magazine. In 2018, Milan Launched his own adult toy line with Fleshjack. In 2019, Milan created the first openly gay, black male superhero comicbook character Ragneron. In November 2019, Milan launched a streaming service, Milan Christopher Television Streaming Network, among being an influencer and a live host on a social networking platform where millions of users can interact worldwide.

=== Sexuality ===
In the past he described himself as gay, but when he announced his relationship with the trans beauty influencer and model Lauryn England in 2020, he declared himself bisexual.
