= Before Pastoral =

1983 book by David M. Halperin

Before Pastoral: Theocritus and the Ancient Tradition of Bucolic Poetry
- Cover
- Author: David M. Halperin
- Language: English
- Subject: Theocritus
- Publisher: Yale University Press
- Publication date: 1983
- Publication place: United States
- Media type: Print (Hardcover)
- Pages: 289
- ISBN: 978-0300025828

Before Pastoral: Theocritus and the Ancient Tradition of Bucolic Poetry is a 1983 book about Theocritus by the classicist David M. Halperin.

== Reception ==
Before Pastoral was praised by the literary scholars Camille Paglia, and Timothy Saunders, who writes that it "still offers the most finely argued case for upholding the distinction between the two categories of 'bucolic' and 'pastoral'."
