= One Hundred Years of Homosexuality =

1990 book by David M. Halperin

One Hundred Years of Homosexuality: and other essays on Greek love
- Cover, showing Jose de Madrazo Santander's painting The Death of the Spanish Rebel Viriathus
- Author: David M. Halperin
- Language: English
- Series: The New Ancient World
- Subject: Homosexuality
- Publisher: Routledge
- Publication date: 1990
- Publication place: United States
- Media type: Print (Hardcover and Paperback)
- Pages: 230
- ISBN: 978-0415900973

One Hundred Years of Homosexuality: And Other Essays on Greek Love is a 1990 book by the classicist David M. Halperin.
