= Dušan Nedić =

Montenegrin basketball player and coach

Personal information
- Born: 28 January 1975 (age 51) Bar, SR Montenegro, Yugoslavia
- Listed height: 2.04 m (6 ft 8 in)
- Listed weight: 105 kg (231 lb)

Career information
- NBA draft: 1997: undrafted
- Playing career: 1993–2007
- Position: Power forward
- Number: 14, 15

Career history
- 1997–1998: Mornar
- 1998–2000: Radnički Beograd
- 2000–2001: Wevelgem
- 2001–2002: Crvena zvezda
- 2002–2003: Carrefour Aveiro
- 2003: Makedonikos
- 2003–2004: SLUC Nancy
- 2004–2007: Hyères-Toulon

Dušan Nedić (born 28 January 1975) is a Montenegrin professional basketball coach and former player.

== Professional career ==
A power forward, Nedić played for Mornar, Radnički Beograd, Wevelgem, Crvena zvezda, Carrefour Aveiro (Portugal), Makedonikos, SLUC Nancy, and Hyères-Toulon. He retired as a player with Hyères-Toulon in 2007.
