= John Schacht =

American self-trained artist

- John Schacht, in 1989, photographed by Marc Hauser.
- Born: February 12, 1938; Chicago, Illinois, United States
- Died: August 10, 2009 (aged 71); Leon, Iowa, United States
- Education: Self-trained
- Known for: Painting, Drawing, Assemblage
- Website: John Schacht

John Schacht, Untitled acrylic and marker on paper, 17.875" x 12", c. 1985.

John Schacht (February 12, 1938 – August 10, 2009) was a self-trained, American artist based in the Midwest. His art ranges from biomorphic abstract paintings to folk-inspired, semi-representational drawings to ritual-like performances, altars and assemblages. Critics sometimes relate his work to Chicago Imagism due to shared affinities for fantastical and erotic imagery, Pop art-like psychedelia, and folk-art and vernacular sources. Friends and colleagues have stated, however, that Schacht, who exhibited inconsistently during his lifetime, was never part of that circle. Schacht was a pre-Stonewall generation gay man; New Art Examiner critic Michel Segard sees in his work a "palpable" sense of the emotional isolation of the closeted gay culture of the 1970s and 1980s. Schacht's work has received its fullest recognition posthumously, through reviews in The New York Times, New Art Examiner, The Brooklyn Rail and Vulture of exhibitions at The Knockdown Center in Queens, New York (2016) and Iceberg Projects in Chicago (2018).

== Life ==
Schacht was born in 1938 on the northwest side of Chicago, and spent his early years there and in Florida. His family life was troubled by alcoholism and divorce; he took refuge in libraries and art, and by age thirteen decided to be an artist. He was a well-read autodidact, who left school at age seventeen before graduating and remained insecure about his lack of formal education. In the mid-1950s, Schacht moved on his own to the Chicago's near-north Old Town neighborhood and its livelier arts scene. As an adult, he would support himself sporadically through part-time jobs at an antique store, hospital and gay bar, as well as sometimes-paid art gigs at the Indianapolis Museum of Art and Art League of Indiana, and instructing at Columbia College Chicago and an Indiana Arts Commission visiting artist program for high schools.

Schacht was an active member of Chicago's burgeoning 1970s gay community, but remained on the periphery of the city's art scene—neither inside nor completely outside. As a result, he showed his work in wildly different contexts. These ranged from art fairs, businesses, community centers and bars like the Old Town Ale House or La Mere Vipere (a gay bar and early punk dance club) to alternative galleries such as Quantum (1981) and WPA (1982), which was directed by his friend and colleague, Charles Thomas Eaton, to established venues such as the Renaissance Society (1976), N.A.M.E. Gallery (1978) and Hyde Park Art Center (1979), which exhibited the nationally known Imagists. In 1989, photographer Marc Hauser took his portrait in various guises, including an "Uncle Sam" outfit.

Through the 1970s, Schacht lived in Chicago and Indianapolis, sometimes commuting between them. In 1981, he moved for financial reasons into a vacant railroad lineman shack without running water on property in rural Talmage, Iowa owned by friend and college professor Ed Homewood. He collected antiques, found objects and bric-a-brac (a lifelong compulsion) there, which he sometimes sold, and continued to create art. In the 1990s, he moved to Phoenix, Arizona to care for his ailing father. When he returned to Iowa in 1997, he discovered that neighbors ransacked his shack, which he attributed to their discovery that he was gay; when they became outwardly hostile toward him, he moved to Leon, Iowa, where he lived until his death at age 71 in 2009. Schacht's friend, artist Jane Wenger, retrieved and preserved his artwork after his death and manages its archive.

== Work and reception ==
Schacht's work can be organized into two key bodies: black-and-white, semi-abstract figurative drawings that explore primal symbols, sexuality and gay identity, which primarily date from the 1970s; and colorful, semi-abstract paintings on paper of still lifes (1970s) and biomorphic patterned forms (1980s and later).

John Schacht, Untitled drawing, pencil on paper, 8.25" x 5.125", c. 1972–5.

=== Early drawings ===
Schacht's early black-and-white drawings, executed in both simple outline or complex, delicate pencil, mix abstract and representational imagery in a stream-of-conscious style. They are structured by a wide set of symbols (e.g., stars, eyes, trees, breasts, penises, vaginas), which serve as a personal shorthand to explore the human collective unconscious, gender dichotomies, and sexuality. In 1975, Indianapolis Museum of Art curator Lynn Karn published a limited edition of 300 spiral-bound books of Schacht's line drawings, titled Gods in Search of a Myth, which debuted in an exhibit at the Washington Gallery in Frankfort, Indiana. She conceived the book with Schacht as a collaborative coloring book whose communication viewer/purchasers would complete when they colored in the images. Reviews have described Schacht's drawings as intimate, cartoon-like abstractions of flowing, organic forms and sexual symbols that convey "the contemporary primal self" in a raw style.

=== Queer expression ===
Later writers have suggested that queerness is both ever-present and repressed in Schacht's work (the most explicit of which was rarely shown in public), citing fugitive S&M elements, embedded genitalia, abstract cowboy figures in chains or leather, and excessive ornamentation. C.C. McKee writes that the visual ornamentation exceeds mere decoration, suggesting a desire to elude and transcend heteronormative constraints through aesthetic means. New Art Examiner critic Michel Segard observed that Schacht's usage of the penis—as a hieroglyph or meme, rather than erotic form (like the later Keith Haring)—and lone males in erotic contexts reveals a closeted tension between expression and repression. Schacht explored similar themes in a ritual performance that was part of a group exhibition at the Renaissance Society (1976), which also featured Edith Altman, Nancy Davidson and Dennis Kowalski. In the performance, a young, jock-strap-clad man was led into a confined cube space by a rope around his neck, suspended from ceiling hooks by a harness, and strapped to the walls by ropes tied around his body; after he went limp, the ropes were cut and he was deposed, laid on the floor, and wrapped in blankets.

=== Paintings on paper ===
John Schacht, Untitled watercolor on paper, c. 1970s.

While still embedded with personal symbols (chairs, teapots, chinoserie, mandalas, and earlier, characteristic forms), Schacht's paintings differ from his drawings in their increased abstraction, intense colors and wider inspirations and imagery. His paintings feature leitmotifs of ceramic vases, Persian textiles, quasi-psychedelic genitalia, cowboy hats and saloon doors in decentralized, rhythmic compositions that Brooklyn Rail critic Diane McClure and others describe as moving between disorder, play, and a sense of the surreal.

Schacht's 1970s paintings include brightly colored, semi-abstract, chaotic still lifes and interiors, stylized portraits of women and 15-foot scroll drawings exploring male and female erotic imagery. The interior still lifes emphasize flattened perspectives and space, rhythmic movement, and a dissolution of the distinction between structure and ornament. The scroll works, painted in golds, silvers, reds and blues, suggest both the spiritual and the erotic. Schacht's later paintings feature morphing organic abstraction and ambiguous character-like forms, painted with curving lines, free-spirited shapes and saturated colors. Critics describe them as displaying spontaneity, impulse and expansion, reigned in by form and intellect; a 1985 series visualized the sensation of sexual play and orgasm through an array of color, ornate design and patterning.
