= Ronn Matlock =

American musician (1947–2020)

Ronn Matlock (15 September 1947 – April 1, 2020) from Detroit, Michigan, United States, was an American songwriter and singer who made a brief recording appearance on the soul scene in 1979; however, his musical talents were utilised on many projects over the years. He stopped recording due to production company management difficulties.

His singles included "Can't Forget About You", "Working Man" and "Take Me To The Top (Of Your Mountain)" from the Love City album, which were recorded in Sound Suite Studios in Detroit. His track, "Let Me Dance", peaked at No.87 in the US Billboard R&B chart.

Matlock collaborated with numerous artists including Keith Barrow, Shirley Caesar, Rick James, Eddie Kendricks, Bobby Taylor, Norman Whitfield and The Originals.

Matlock died on April 1, 2020, at the age of 72.

== Discography ==
- 1979 - Love City - Cotillion Records
- 1979 - Let Me Dance - Cotillion Records
- 1979 - "Back Street" / "Let Me Dance" - Atlantic Records

== Labels ==
- Atlantic Records
- Cotillion Records
- Motown
