= Shannon Downey =

American crafter and activist

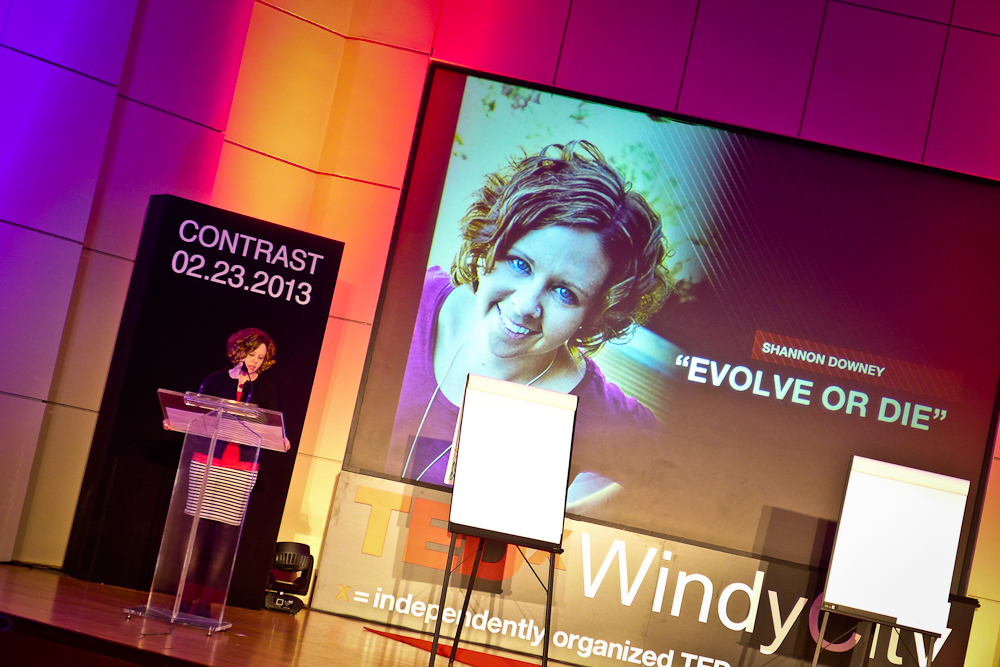
- Shannon Downey at TEDx Windy City in 2013
- Born: Weymouth, Massachusetts, United States
- Occupation: Director of development at Asian American Advancing Justice
- Known for: Using cross-stitching as an activism tool
- Notable work: "Boys Will Be Boys"

Shannon Downey is an American crafter and activist. Downey is recognized as a leader in the field of craftivism, using cross-stitching as an activism tool. Downey serves as director of development at Asian American Advancing Justice and is an adjunct professor at DePaul University and Columbia College.

== Early life and education ==
Shannon Downey was born in Weymouth, Massachusetts. Downey's parents were union organizers. Their home was the epicenter of organizing and community activism. As a result, Downey was involved, as a child, in protests, which inspired their activism as an adult. Downey learned how to cross-stitch in the fifth grade.

Downey earned an undergraduate degree in anthropology from the University of Massachusetts Amherst and a graduate degree in recreation administration from Aurora University.

== Career and crafting ==
Downey worked in digital marketing for ten years. Today, Downey serves as director of development at Asian American Advancing Justice. Downey is also an adjunct professor of business at DePaul University and Columbia College.

=== Crafting ===
Downey returned to cross-stitching as a hobby, learning the craft after feeling "burnt out" in their decade long career in technology. They found a cross-stitch pattern on Etsy of Captain Picard and began cross stitching again.

After Downey's house was involved in a drive by shooting, Downey created their first craftivism piece about gun violence. Downey posted the picture on Instagram and received requests for the pattern. In response, Downey asked for other crafters to create their own gun violence-related patterns. The pieces were exhibited at an art gallery, with all being sold, raising $5,000 for an anti-violence nonprofit, Project Fire.

Downey started BadAss Cross Stitch in 2016 to showcase her craftivism pieces. Downey's breakthrough piece was "Boys Will Be Boys", a cross-stitch created in response to the Donald Trump Access Hollywood tape. The piece, which reads "Boys will be ~~boys~~ held accountable for their fucking actions," went viral after being shared by Rose McGowan, Colin Hanks, Adriana Lima, Sarah Hyland, Martha Hunt, Zoë Kravitz, Tracee Ellis Ross, Jonathan Tucker, and Emily Ratajkowski. Her cross-stitch for the first Women's March in Chicago went viral after being shared by George Takei. The sign reads "I'm so angry I stitched this just so I could stab something 3,000 times."

In 2019, Downey launched Badass Herstory, a public art and digital project. Downey's goal through the project is to collect one million stories of women, female identifying, and gender non-conforming people, all presented in cross-stitch form. That same year, Downey created a project to complete a quilt, which they found partially completed at an estate sale in the Chicago area. The United States' themed quilt was started by 99-year-old Rita Smith, who died before completing the project. Downey recruited crafters from across the country to finish the project. The completed quilt was displayed in December 2019 at Women Made Gallery in Chicago. The project, titled "Rita's Quilt", was chosen as one of the "top feel good stories" by The Guardian for 2019.

Downey finds inspiration in the work of Pearl Dick, Judy Chicago, Matthew Hoffman, Natalie Boyett, Shawn Smith and Francine Turk.

== Personal life ==
Downey lives in Chicago, Illinois.
