= David M. Halperin =

American academic

David Halperin
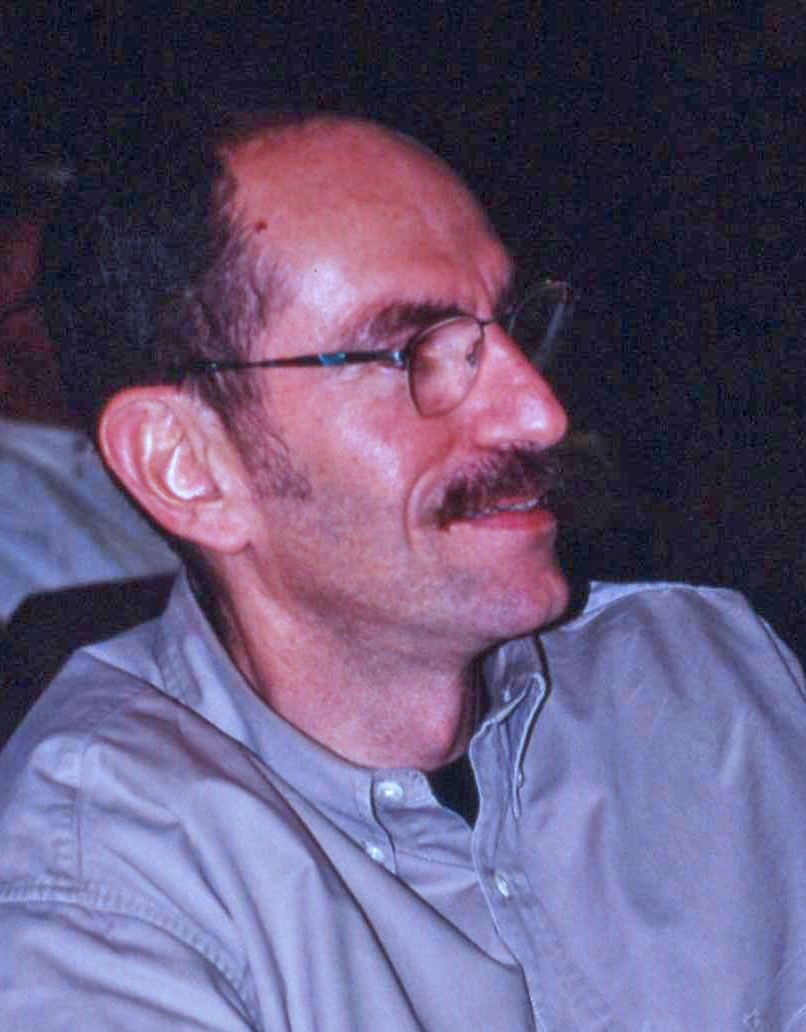
- Halperin in 2000
- Born: April 2, 1952 (age 74); Chicago, Illinois, U.S.

Academic background
- Education: Oberlin College (BA); Stanford University (MA, PhD)

David M. Halperin (born April 2, 1952) is an American theorist in the fields of gender studies, queer theory, critical theory, material culture and visual culture. He is the cofounder of GLQ: A Journal of Lesbian and Gay Studies, and author of several books including Before Pastoral (1983) and One Hundred Years of Homosexuality (1990).

== Early life and education ==
David Halperin was born on April 2, 1952, in Chicago, Illinois. He graduated from Oberlin College in 1973, having studied abroad at the Intercollegiate Center for Classical Studies in 1972–1973. He received his PhD in Classics and Humanities from Stanford University in 1980.

== Career ==
In 1977, Halperin served as Associate Director of the Summer Session of the School of Classical Studies at the American Academy in Rome. From 1981 to 1996, he served as Professor of Literature at the Massachusetts Institute of Technology. Alongside Tina Passman, Halperin was one of the first co-chairs of the Lesbian and Gay Classical Caucus, now Lambda Classical Caucus, which was founded in 1989. In 1994, he taught at the University of Queensland, and in 1995 at Monash University. From 1996 to 1999, he was a Lecturer in Sociology at the University of New South Wales. He is currently W. H. Auden Distinguished University Professor Emeritus of the History and Theory of Sexuality, Professor Emeritus of English Language and Literature, and Professor Emeritus of Women's and Gender Studies.

In 1991, he co-founded the academic journal GLQ: A Journal of Lesbian and Gay Studies, and served as its editor until 2006. His work has been published in the Journal of Bisexuality, Identities: Journal for Politics, Gender and Culture, Journal of Homosexuality, Michigan Feminist Studies, Michigan Quarterly Review, Representations, the Bryn Mawr Classical Review, Ex Aequo, UNSW Tharunka, Australian Humanities Review, Sydney Star Observer, The UTS Review, Salmagundi, Blueboy, History and Theory, Diacritics, American Journal of Philology, Classical Antiquity, Ancient Philosophy, Yale Review, Critical Inquiry, Virginia Quarterly Review, American Notes & Queries, London Review of Books, Journal of Japanese Studies, Partisan Review, and Classical Journal.

He has been a Rome Prize Fellow at the American Academy in Rome and a Fellow at the National Humanities Center in North Carolina, as well as a fellow at the Stanford Humanities Center, the Humanities Research Centre at the Australian National University in Canberra, and at the Society for the Humanities at Cornell University. In 2008–2009, he received a Guggenheim Fellowship. He received the Michael Lynch Service Award from the Gay and Lesbian Caucus at the Modern Language Association, as well as the Distinguished Editor Award from the Council of Editors of Learned Journals. In 2011–2012, he received the Brudner Prize at Yale University.

Halperin is openly gay. In 1990, he launched a campaign to oppose the presence of the ROTC on the MIT campus, on the grounds that it discriminated against gay and lesbian students. That same year, he received death threats for his gay activism. In 2003, the Michigan chapter of the American Family Association tried to ban his course 'How to Be Gay: Male Homosexuality and Initiation.' In 2010, he wrote an open letter to Michigan's 52nd Attorney General Mike Cox to denounce the homophobic harassment by one of the latter's staffers, Andrew Shirvell, of a University of Michigan student, Chris Armstrong.

== Work ==
=== Genealogy of homosexuality ===
Halperin uses the method of genealogy to study the history of homosexuality. He argues that Aristophanes' speech in Plato's Symposium does not indicate a "taxonomy" of heterosexuals and homosexuals comparable to modern ones. Medieval historian John Boswell has criticized Halperin's arguments.

=== One Hundred Years of Homosexuality ===
Halperin's book was published in 1990, two years before the centenary of Charles Gilbert Chaddock's English translation of Richard von Krafft-Ebing's Psychopathia Sexualis. Chaddock is credited with the first use of the term "homosexual" in English in this translation. Halperin believes that the introduction of this term marks an important change in the treatment and consideration of homosexuality. The book collects six essays by the author. The first essay gives the book its title.

== Reception by the academic community ==
=== Accusations of plagiarism ===
Didier Eribon demanded that his name be withdrawn as a recipient of the 2008 Brudner Prize because he did not want to be associated with Halperin, who won the Brudner for his book What Do Gay Men Want? and whom Eribon accused of plagiarizing Eribon's work, Une morale du minoritaire. According to L'Express in 2011, Halperin had not yet responded to Eribon's claims.

=== Criticism by Camille Paglia ===
In her 1991 essay "Junk Bonds and Corporate Raiders: Academe in the Hour of the Wolf", Camille Paglia finds in Halperin's work a prototypical example of rampant careerism in the humanities. Paglia observes that Halperin's generation of academics is prone to a "contemporary parochialism" that eagerly cites hot-off-the-press articles without attempting to critically assess their objective merit in light of the intellectual tradition. Paglia accuses Halperin of assembling a pastiche of the latest faddish opinions and marketing it as a book, not for the sake of advancing the cause of truth, but with no other aim than career advancement. She compares such scholarship to junk bonds, a highly volatile investment. Paglia's long review article was itself criticised in the following issue of Arion by W. Ralph Johnson and Thomas Van Nortwick.

Since Paglia's critique, Halperin has gone on to publish four monographs and co-edited two volumes of queer criticism.

== Publications ==
- Before Pastoral: Theocritus and the Ancient Tradition of Bucolic Poetry. New Haven: Yale University Press. 1983.
- Before Sexuality: The Construction of Erotic Experience in the Ancient Greek World. Edited with John J. Winkler and Froma I. Zeitlin. Princeton: Princeton University Press. 1990.
- One Hundred Years of Homosexuality: and Other Essays on Greek Love. New York: Routledge. 1990.
- The Lesbian and Gay Studies Reader. Edited with Henry Abelove and Michele Aina Barale. New York: Routledge. 1993.
- Saint Foucault: Towards a Gay Hagiography. New York: Oxford University Press. 1995.
- How to Do the History of Homosexuality. Chicago: University of Chicago Press. 2002. ISBN 9780226314471.
- What Do Gay Men Want? An Essay on Sex, Risk, and Subjectivity. Ann Arbor: University of Michigan Press. 2007.
- Gay Shame. Edited with Valerie Traub. Chicago: University of Chicago Press. 2009.
- How to Be Gay. Cambridge, Massachusetts: Belknap Press. 2012.
- The War on Sex. Edited with Trevor Hoppe. Durham: Duke University Press. 2017.
