= Rudolf Brazda =

Concentration camp internee charged by the Nazi German regime with homosexuality

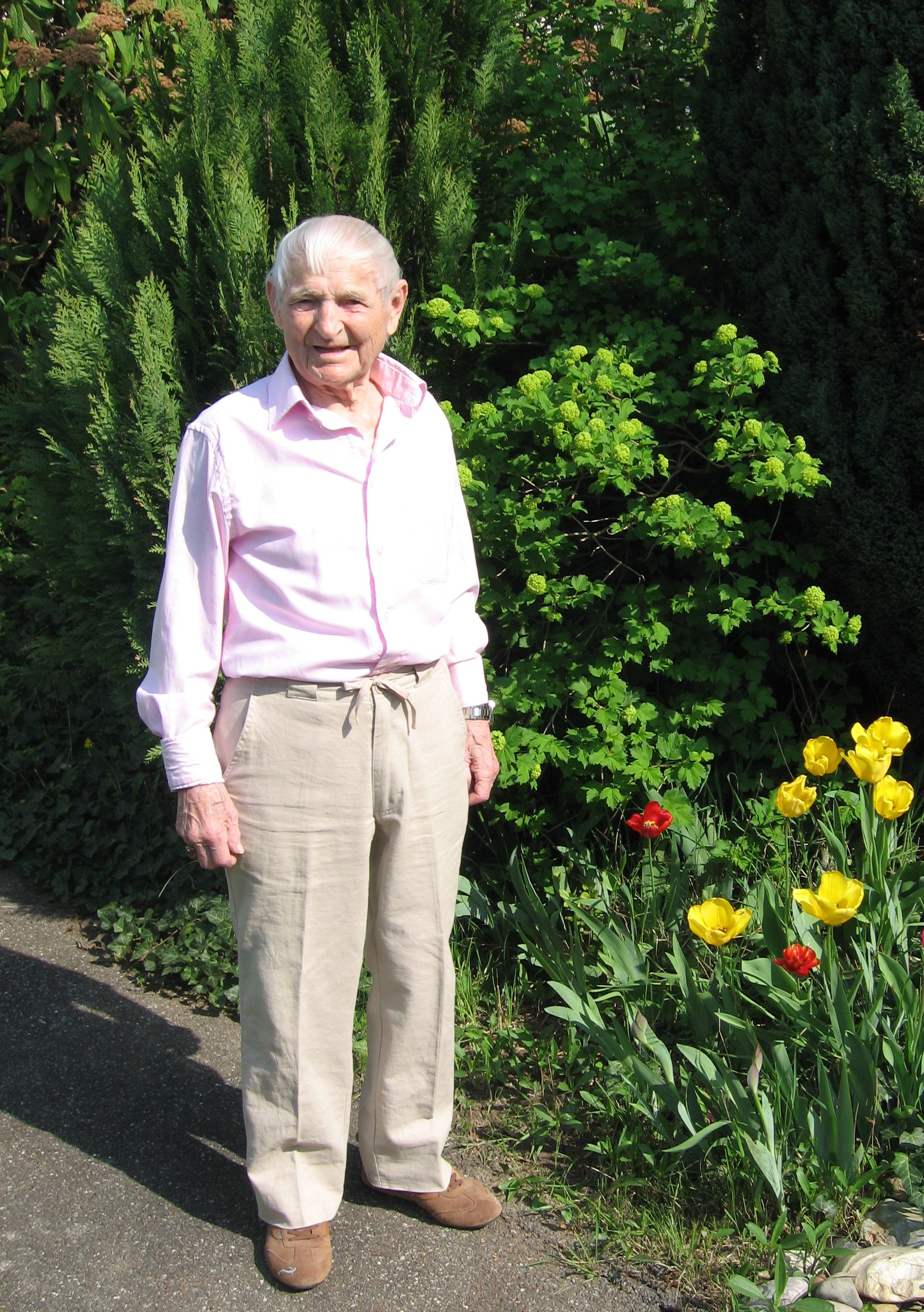
- Brazda in 2009
- Born: 26 June 1913; Brossen, German Empire
- Died: 3 August 2011 (aged 98); Les Molènes, Bantzenheim, France
- Known for: Concentration camp survivor
- Partner: Edouard Mayer

Rudolf Brazda (26 June 1913 – 3 August 2011) was the last known concentration camp survivor deported by Nazi Germany on charges of homosexuality. Brazda spent nearly three years at the Buchenwald concentration camp, where his prisoner uniform was branded with the distinctive pink triangle that the Nazis used to mark men interned as homosexuals. After the liberation of Buchenwald, Brazda settled in Alsace, northeastern France, in May 1945 and lived there for the rest of his life.

Although other gay men who survived the Holocaust are still alive, they were not known to the Nazis as homosexuals and were not deported as pink triangle internees. At least two gay men who were interned as Jews, for instance, have spoken publicly of their experiences.

== Life ==
=== 1913–1937: Caught in interwar upheaval ===
Brazda was born in Brossen (now part of Meuselwitz, Thuringia, Germany), the last of eight siblings, born to parents originating in Bohemia and who had emigrated to Saxony to earn a living (his father worked at the local brown coal mines). After World War I, he became a Czechoslovak citizen, owing to his parents' origins in that newly established country. His father, who was demobilised only in 1919, died a year later following a work accident.

Brazda grew up in Brossen, later in nearby Meuselwitz where he started training as a roofer, failing to get an apprenticeship as a sales assistant with a gentlemen's outfitter. In the early 1930s, prior to the Nazis' accession to power, he was able to live his sexuality openly, thanks to the climate of relative tolerance which prevailed in the last days of the Weimar Republic. In the summer of 1933, he met Werner, his first companion. Together they shared a sublease in the house of a Jehovah's Witness landlady, who was fully aware and tolerant of the bond existing between them. In the following two years, despite the Nazi accession to power and the subsequent reinforcement of Paragraph 175, they led a happy life, befriending other male homosexuals, and would often take trips locally, or further away, to visit gay meeting places, such as the "New York" Café in Leipzig.

In 1936, Werner was enlisted to do his military service and Brazda took up a position as bellhop at a hotel in Leipzig. As of 1935, the Nazis extension of legal provisions criminalizing homosexuality generated a dramatic increase of lawsuits against homosexuals. Thus, in 1937, following police investigations into the lives of his gay friends, Brazda was suspected and remanded in custody pending further enquiries. In Altenburg, he was eventually tried and sentenced to six months in prison for breaching the terms of Paragraph 175. Werner was tried and sentenced elsewhere and circumstances led to them losing sight of each other in the ensuing months. Werner is rumoured to have died in 1940 while on military duty on the French front, in the battles raging against Britain.

=== 1938–1941: Exiled in Sudetenland ===
Having served his sentence, Brazda was soon to be expelled from Germany, shortly after his release from prison in October 1937. From a legal and technical point of view, he was considered a Czechoslovak citizen with a criminal record and, as such, treated as persona non grata in Nazi Germany, and made to leave the country. Because his parents had not taught him Czech, he left for Czechoslovakia, but opted to settle in the German-speaking region of Sudetenland, the westernmost province of the country, bordering on Germany. There, he went to live in Karlsbad (today Karlovy Vary in the Czech Republic).

Despite the province's annexation by Nazi Germany less than a year later, Brazda managed to find work as a roofer and settled in with a new partner by the name of Anton. Unfortunately, Brazda's name came up again in police enquiries led against distant gay acquaintances. In April 1941, he was imprisoned again on suspicion of homosexual activities, and later charged by a court in the town of Eger (today Cheb in the Czech Republic), following a new trial. In June 1942, instead of being released at the end of his second prison term, he was remanded in "Schutzhaft", or protective custody, the first measure leading to his deportation to a KZ (Konzentrationslager).

=== 1942–1945: Buchenwald ===
Brazda was deported to the Buchenwald concentration camp on 8 August 1942 and remained there until its liberation, on 11 April 1945. He was prisoner number 7952 and started with forced labour at the stone quarry, prior to being posted to a lighter task in the quarry's infirmary. Several months later, he joined the roofers unit, part of the "Bauhof" kommando, in charge of maintaining the numerous buildings that constituted the camp (dormitories, barracks, administrative buildings, armament factories, etc.). On many occasions, Brazda was a witness of Nazi cruelty towards homosexuals as well as other detainees, aware of the fate awaiting a lot of them at the camp's revier: it was not uncommon for sick or disabled prisoners to be executed by lethal injection at the sick bay.

With the help of a kapo who hid him in the early days of April 1945, shortly before the camp's evacuation, Brazda was able to avoid being sent away with thousands of prisoners. These forced evacuation measures turned into death marches for nearly half of them, who were shot on the spot if they were too weak to sustain the pace.

Within the roofers' kommando, Brazda had been able to make friends with other deportees, mostly communists, and in particular with Fernand, a Frenchman from Mulhouse, in the Alsace province. After the camp's liberation, instead of returning to his place of birth and his family who had stayed in Germany, Brazda decided to follow the Frenchman to the latter's home country. Fernand had been deported on political grounds, having been involved in the International Brigades and fought between 1936 and 1938 in the Spanish Civil War. In May 1945, both eventually arrived in Mulhouse, shortly after VE Day. Brazda soon found employment again, still as a roofer.

=== After 1945: Life in France ===
Brazda decided to settle in southern Alsace and started visiting local gay cruising grounds, noticeably the Steinbach public garden where Pierre Seel, another homosexual deportee, had been identified by the French police shortly before the outbreak of World War II.

In the early 1950s, at a costume ball, Brazda met Edouard "Edi" Mayer, who became his life companion. In the early 1960s, they moved into a house they built in the suburbs of Mulhouse, where Brazda resided until not long before his death. He tended to Edi for over 30 years after Edi was crippled by a severe work accident, until his death in 2003.

=== As of 2008: Public recognition of his life story ===
In spite of old age, he remained a keen observer and follower of the news. Thus, in 2008, when he heard on German TV of the impending unveiling of a memorial to homosexual victims of Nazism in Berlin, he decided to make himself known. Although he was not present at the monument's inauguration on 27 May 2008, an invitation was extended to him to attend a ceremony a month later, on the morning of the Berlin CSD gay pride march. Brazda subsequently was invited to attend a number of gay events, including Europride Zurich in 2009 and some smaller scaled events in France, Switzerland and Germany.

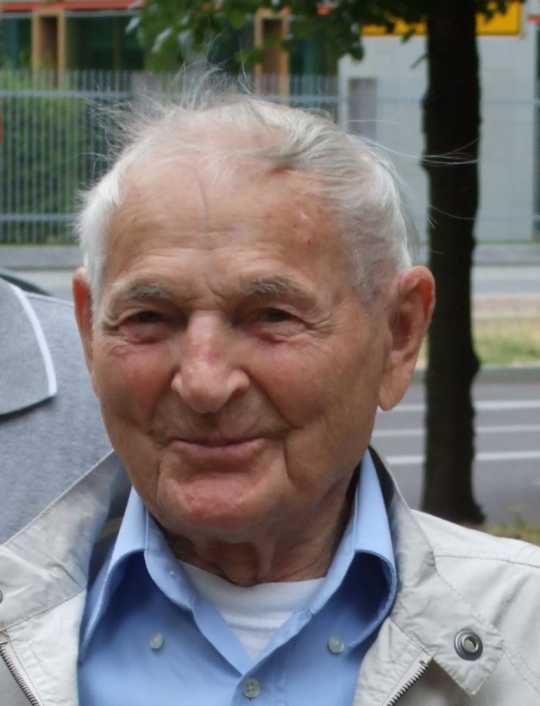
Rudolf Brazda on June 27, 2008 in Berlin

In 2010, Rudolf Brazda took part in Mulhouse in the unveiling of a plaque in memory of Pierre Seel and others who were deported because of their homosexuality and was a guest of honour at a remembrance ceremony at Buchenwald.

On Saturday 25 September 2010, Brazda was symbolically present on the site of the former Natzweiler-Struthof concentration camp on the occasion of a plaque unveiling ceremony. The plaque reads, "In Memory of the Victims of Nazi Barbarity, Deported Because of Their Homosexuality."

In 2010, Brazda also received the gold medals of the cities of Toulouse and Nancy in recognition of his commitment to bear witness locally and nationally in France. Brazda was determined to continue speaking out about his past, in the hope that younger generations remain vigilant in the face of present-day behaviour and thought patterns similar to those which led to the persecutions endured by homosexuals during the Nazi era.

In recognition of his numerous contributions to public debates, media interviews and research articles, nationally and internationally, not least his involvement in a citizens group promoting awareness of homosexual deportation in France, Brazda was appointed Knight in the National order of the Legion of Honour, in the 2011 Easter honours list. He received his Knight insignia four days later from Marie-José Chombart de Lauwe, president of the French Foundation for the Remembrance of Deportation, in Puteaux (the city whose gold medal he also received on that occasion), in the presence, among others, of Raymond Aubrac, a well-known French Resistance figure.

Brazda supported research work by the French citizens group Les « Oublié(e)s » de la Mémoire who made him an honorary member on 3 October 2008.

His original biography, Itinéraire d'un Triangle rose (A Pink Triangle's life journey; currently available in French, Portuguese, Spanish and Czech) is the only book he personally verified and authorised. It is the testimony of the likely last survivor of those men who were marked by a pink triangle and shows how Nazi repression of homosexuality directly impacted his life path. For the first time a book discloses the details of minute police investigations led to convict him and other homosexuals who had come under scrutiny. It also deals with issues such as human sexuality in concentration camps.

A longer, more scholarly German-language biography of Brazda was published later: "Das Glück kam immer zu mir": Rudolf Brazda—Das Überleben eines Homosexuellen im Dritten Reich by Alexander Zinn (Campus Verlag, 2011). The book is currently available in German only.

== Death ==
Brazda died on 3 August 2011, at the age of 98, at Les Molènes, an assisted living facility in the town of Bantzenheim in northeastern France. His death was first announced by Yagg.com, a French gay, lesbian, bisexual and transgender news and online community site, quoting his French biographer and last will's executor. Brazda's funeral was held on 8 August 2011 in Mulhouse, France. After a remembrance service attended by approximately 40 people, his body was cremated, and his ashes interred alongside those of his late partner Edouard Mayer, in the Cemetery of Mulhouse.

== Tributes and memorials ==
Immediately following Rudolf Brazda's death, numerous organizations and officials in France paid tribute to his memory. Among those releasing statements were Marc Laffineur, secretary of state for the Ministry of Defense and Veterans Affairs; the Socialist Party (France); Ian Brossat, president of the French Communist Party/Left Party (France) caucus of the Paris City Council; Jean-Luc Romero, president of Elus Locaux Contre le Sida (Local Elected Officials Against AIDS); the AIDS activist organization ACT UP–Paris; Les Oubli-é-es de la Mémoire; and the Mémorial de la Déportation Homosexuelle, a national French association that commemorates the homosexual victims of Nazi persecution.

Obituaries of Rudolf Brazda appeared in publications and on websites worldwide. English-language obituaries based on original reporting and analysis were published by the Associated Press (United States); Czech Position (Prague); the Los Angeles Times; The New York Times; RFI (France); The Telegraph; The Independent (London); UPI (United States); and numerous other media outlets.

On 28 September 2011, a national tribute ceremony to Rudolf was organised by Les « Oublié(e)s » de la Mémoire and patroned by Mr. Marc Laffineur, Secretary of State for Defence and Veterans. It was held at Saint-Roch's Church, Paris, which houses a memorial chapel to victims of Deportation. Officials, diplomacy representatives, as well as militants and association representatives were in attendance. It was yet another opportunity to recall that in the last three years of his life, Rudolf had become a unique witness, and that remembering homosexual deportation today remains essential in the struggle against discriminations.

== Bibliography ==
=== Biographies ===
- Schwab, Jean-Luc & Rudolf Brazda (2010). Itinéraire d'un Triangle rose (1st ed.). Éditions Florent Massot. ISBN 978-2-916546-48-3.
- Zinn, Alexander (2011). "Das Glück kam immer zu mir": Rudolf Brazda—Das Überleben eines Homosexuellen im Dritten Reich (1st ed.). Campus Verlag. ISBN 978-3-593-39435-0.
- Schwab, Jean-Luc & Rudolf Brazda (2011). Triângulo rosa - Um homossexual no campo de concentração nazista (1st ed.). Mescla Editorial. ISBN 978-85-88641-13-6.
- Schwab, Jean-Luc (2011). Rudolf Brazda. Itinerario de un triángulo rosa (1st ed.). Alianza Editorial. ISBN 978-84-206-6433-0.
- Schwab, Jean-Luc & Rudolf Brazda (2012). Rudolf Brazda. Cesta růžového trojúhelníku (1st ed.). Paseka. ISBN 978-80-7432-199-3.

=== Obituaries ===
- Agence France Presse (France): (2011-08-04). "Last gay Nazi death camp survivor dies aged 98." Retrieved 2011-08-07.
- Associated Press (United States): Moulsen, Geir (2011-08-04). "Man interned for homosexuality by Nazis dies at 98." Retrieved 2011-08-06.
- CzechPosition.com (Czech Republic): Kenety, Brian (2011-08-04). "Last gay Holocaust survivor Rudolf Brázda dies." Retrieved 2011-08-06.
- Deutsche Welle (Germany): Impey, Joanna (2011-08-08). "Last gay survivor of Nazi concentration camps dies". Retrieved 2011-08-09.
- Jerusalem Post (Israel): Weinthal, Benjamin (2011-08-06). "Last homosexual concentration camp survivor dies at 98." Retrieved 2011-08-07.
- Los Angeles Times (United States): Willsher, Kim (2011-08-05). "Rudolf Brazda dies at 98; survivor of Nazis' persecution of gays." Retrieved 2011-08-06.
- New York Times (United States): Hevsei, Dennis (2011-08-06). "Rudolf Brazda, 98, Dies; Survived Pink Triangle." Retrieved 2011-08-06.
- RFI (France): (2011-08-04). "Last gay concentration camp survivor dies." Retrieved 2011-08-06.
- The Telegraph (United Kingdom): Davison, Phil (2011-08-04). "Obituaries: Rudolf Brazda." Retrieved 2011-08-06.
- UPI (United States): (2011-08-05). "Last gay concentration camp survivor dies."; includes brief video. Retrieved 2011-08-07.
- Washington Post (United States): Langer, Emily (2011-08-07). "Rudolf Brazda dies; gay man who survived Nazi concentration camp was 98." Retrieved 2011-08-07.
- The Independent (United Kingdom): (2011-08-09). "Rudolf Brazda: Last known survivor of the 'Pink Triangle' gay inmates of Nazi concentration camps"

== See also ==
- Gad Beck
- Albrecht Becker
- Heinz Dörmer
- Karl Gorath
- Wilhelm Heckmann
- Pierre Seel
- Kurt von Ruffin
- Friedrich-Paul von Groszheim
- Persecution of homosexuals in Nazi Germany and the Holocaust
