= Pierre Seel =

Gay Holocaust survivor (1923–2005)

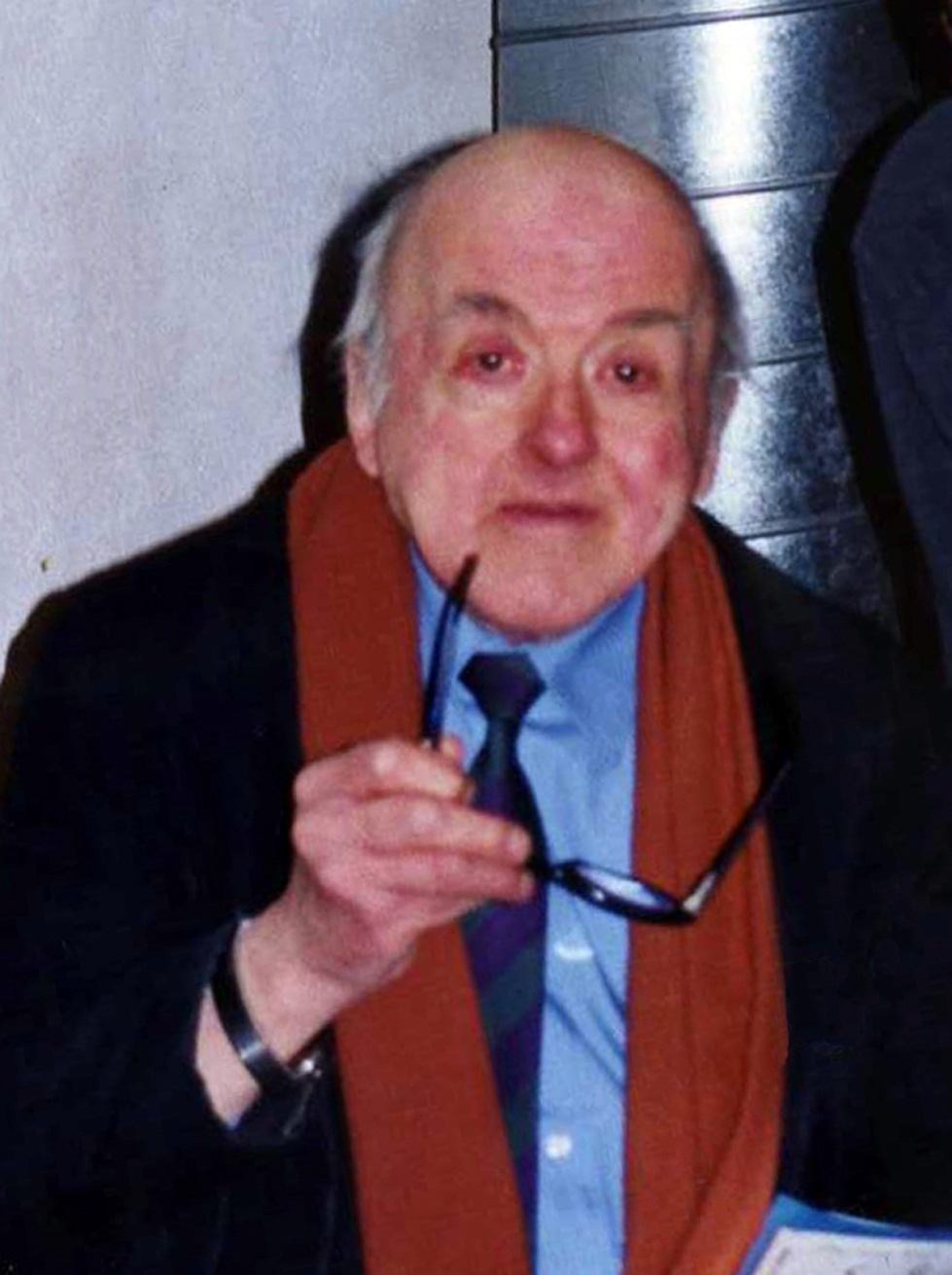
- Pierre Seel in Berlin, February 2000
- Born: 16 August 1923; Haguenau, Bas-Rhin, France
- Died: 25 November 2005 (aged 82); Toulouse, Haute-Garonne, France
- Known for: Gay Holocaust survivor

Pierre Seel (16 August 1923 – 25 November 2005) was a gay Holocaust survivor who was conscripted into the German Army and the only French person to have testified openly about his experience of deportation during World War II due to his homosexuality.

== Biography ==
Pierre was the fifth and last son of an affluent Catholic Alsatian family, and he was born at the family castle of Fillate in Haguenau. At the age of eleven, he discovered that his younger sister, Josephine (Fifine to him), was in fact his cousin, adopted by his father when her mother died. His father ran a successful patisserie-confiserie shop on Mulhouse's main street (at 46 rue du Sauvage). His mother, Emma Jeanne, once director of a department store, joined the family business when she married. By his late teens, Pierre Seel was part of the Mulhouse (Alsace) gay and Zazou subcultures. He suspected that his homosexuality was due to the repressive Catholic morals of his family which forbade him to show interest in girls his age during his early teens. He found it difficult to come to terms with and accept his homosexuality, and described himself as short tempered.

In 1939, he was in a public garden (le Square Steinbach) notorious as a "cruising" ground for men. While he was there, his watch was stolen, a gift that his godmother had given to him at his recent communion. Reporting the theft to the police meant that, unknown to him, his name was added to a list of homosexuals held by the police (homosexuality had not been illegal in France since 1791; the Vichy Regime did not, contrary to legend, recriminalize homosexuality, but in August 1942 it did outlaw sexual relations between an adult and a minor under twenty-one, and it also persecuted homosexuals, despite there being no laws criminalizing homosexuality). The German invasion curtailed Seel's hopes of studying textiles in Lille. He completed vocational training in accounting, decoration and sales and found a sales assistant job at a neighbouring shop.

=== In Schirmeck-Vorbrück ===
On 3 May 1941, Seel was arrested. He was tortured and raped with a piece of wood. He was then sent to the city jail before being transferred on 13 May 1941 to the Vorbruck-Schirmeck concentration camp, about 30 km west of Strasbourg. His prison uniform was marked with a blue bar (marking Catholic and "asocial" prisoners) rather than the infamous pink triangle which was not in use at Schirmeck. He later noted: "There was no solidarity for the homosexual prisoners; they belonged to the lowest caste. Other prisoners, even when between themselves, used to target them."

While at Schirmeck, he witnessed the execution of his lover, Jo, in front of the assembled prisoners. Until that moment, Seel had been unaware that Jo was also at the camp. SS officers stripped Jo naked, placed a pail over his head, and then unleashed their German shepherd guard dogs on him, who then tore apart and ate him. The event haunted Seel for the rest of his life. His autobiography is dedicated to Jo.

On 6 November 1941, after months of starvation, ill treatment and forced labour, Seel was set free with no explanation and made a German citizen. He was sworn to secrecy about his experience by Karl Buck, the commander of the camp. He was made to report daily to the Gestapo offices.

=== The rest of the war ===
Between 21 March and 26 September 1942, Seel was forced to join the RAD (Reichsarbeitsdienst) to receive some military training. First, he was sent to Vienna as an aide-de-camp to a German officer. Then, it was a military airport in Gütersloh near the Dutch-German border.

On 15 October 1942, he was incorporated to the Wehrmacht and become one of the "malgré-nous" (despite ourselves), young men born in Alsace or Lorraine enrolled against their will into the German army who had to fight with their enemies against the people they supported. During the next three years, he criss-crossed Europe without much recollection of events, places and dates. This time he was sent to Yugoslavia. While fighting the local resistance, he and his fellow soldiers burned isolated villages inhabited by women and children only. One day he found himself in front of a partisan who broke Seel's jaw, as a result of which he soon lost all his teeth. The man did not recover from the ensuing fight. Wounded, Seel was sent to Berlin in an administrative position.

In spring 1943, to his bemusement, Seel was sent to Pomerania to a Lebensborn, one of a dozen places in the Reich dreamed up by Heinrich Himmler and dedicated to breeding a new race according to the Nazis' standards of Aryan "purity". Young, healthy couples were encouraged to procreate and give their children to the Reich. He only stayed there a few days.

In summer 1943, he volunteered to join the Reichsbank and became a teller on trains for soldiers on leave between Belgrade and Salonica. This ended with the attempt on Hitler's life on 20 July 1944, which demanded a strengthening of authority. Seel found himself helping the civilian population in the Berlin underground during a 40 days and nights attack by the Allies.

While things started to unravel for the Reich, Seel was sent to Smolensk on the Russian front. After having allowed the horse of the officer he was serving to run away, Seel was sent to a dangerous and exposed position alone with another Alsatian. The enemy kept on firing at them and soon Seel's companion was killed. He spent three days there, close to madness, believing himself forgotten.

As the German debacle was becoming imminent, his commanding officer invited him to desert with him. Soon after, the officer was killed and Seel found himself alone and decided to surrender to the Soviet troops and started to follow them west. Somewhere in Poland, however, he found himself arrested and threatened to be shot as a part of a reprisal execution after the murder of an officer. He saved his life by stepping forward in front of the firing squad and starting to sing the Internationale.

In Poland, Seel parted ways with the Russian army and joined a group of concentration camp survivors soon to be brought back to France. The Red Cross soon took over and organised a train convoy. This however did not go west but south, through Odessa and the Black Sea, in terrible sanitary conditions. Seel was still in Poland on 8 May 1945 when the Armistice was declared. In Odessa, as he was put in charge of order in the refugee camp he was in, he contracted malaria. At this time he was also advised to change his name to Celle and hide the fact that he was Alsatian by saying he was from Belfort.

After a long wait in Odessa for a boat to take him back to France, "Pierre Celle" finally arrived in Paris on 7 August 1945 after a train journey through Europe, via Romania, Germany, the Netherlands and Belgium. Again, Seel found himself requisitioned for an administrative task, in this case, the ticking of the long lists of other refugees being sent home.

On reaching Mulhouse, Seel realized that he would have to lie about his true story and, like all the others, lie about the reasons for his deportation. "I was already starting to censor my memories, and I became aware that, in spite of my expectations, in spite of all I had imagined, of the long-awaited joy of returning, the true Liberation, was for other people."

=== After the war ===
After the end of the war, the Charles de Gaulle government cleaned up the French Penal Code, principally getting rid of the anti-Semitic laws. The article against homosexual relations between adults and minors, however, remained in force until 1982. The anti-homosexual atmosphere of the 1940s–1960s meant that for the returning victims, the possibility of telling their story was thwarted by the fear of further stigmatisation. In his book, Seel also notes an increase of anti-homosexual attacks in Mulhouse, after the war. In his family itself, Seel found a negative reaction to his homosexuality. His closest relatives decided to avoid broaching the subject while other members of the extended family made humiliating jokes. His godfather disinherited him.

After starting to work as a stock manager at a fabric warehouse, Seel set up an association to help the local destitute families by giving out food and clothes. He also cared for his ageing and ailing mother, with whom he grew close and the only person to whom he related his experience for over thirty years. For four years, the beginning of what he called the years of shame, Seel led a life of "painful sadness", during which he slowly came to decide that he must renounce his homosexuality. Following in his parents' footsteps, he contacted a dating agency and on 21 August 1950, he civilly married the daughter of a Spanish dissident (the religious marriage took place on 30 September 1950 in the Notre-Dame-du-Rosaire church of Saint-Ouen). He decided not to tell his wife about his homosexuality.

Their first child was still-born, but they eventually had two sons (1952 and 1954) and a daughter (1957). In 1952, for the birth of their second child, they moved near Paris, in the Vallée de Chevreuse, where Seel opened a fabric store which was not successful. He soon had to find work in a larger Parisian textile company. The family got involved with the local Catholic community. Seel found it difficult to relate to his children; he felt remote from his last born, while he did not know how to express his love for his two boys without it being misinterpreted.

The 1960s offered little stability to the family with moves to Blois, Orléans, Compiègne, Rouen and back to Compiègne, following Seel's career. This instability put further strains on his marriage. In 1968, Seel found himself trapped for four days in the besieged Sorbonne when he was sent as observer by his local Parents Association. He then went down to Toulouse where he was to check the family's new flat attached to his wife's new job in the administration. There, he was arrested under suspicion of stirring the young demonstrators. The family finally settled in Toulouse.

During the next ten years, Seel grew further apart from his wife, tormented by feelings of inadequacy, shame, and confusion about his sexuality. By the time he and his wife separated in 1978, he was already under tranquilizers. He started to drink and considered becoming homeless, even sleeping rough three times to test himself. After one of his sons threatened to never see him again if he did not stop drinking, he joined a counselling group. In 1979, when he was working for an insurance company, still trying for reconciliation with his estranged wife, he attended a discussion in a local bookshop for the launch of the French edition of Heinz Heger's The Men with the Pink Triangle, a memoir of the concentration camp experiences of Josef Kohout. After the event Seel met with the speakers, and a meeting was organized for the next day. Heger's book inspired Seel's coming out as a gay man and as a victim of the Nazis. He joined his local branch of David et Jonathan, a gay and lesbian Christian association.

== Speaking out ==
In 1981, the testimony collected by Jean-Pierre Joecker (director and founder of the gay magazine Masques) was published anonymously in a special edition of the French translation of the play Bent by Martin Sherman. In April 1982, in response to anti-gay declarations and actions by Léon Elchinger, the Bishop of Strasbourg, Seel spoke publicly and wrote an open letter to the Bishop on 18 November. He simultaneously circulated the text to his family. The letter was published in Gai Pied Hebdo No 47 on 11 December. At the same time, he started the official process of getting compensation from the state.

On 9 April 1989, Seel returned to the sites of the Schirmeck and Struthof camps for the first time. He spent the last 12 years or so with his long-term partner, Eric Féliu, with whom he bred dogs in Toulouse, which helped him to overcome the fear of dogs he had developed after Jo's death. Seel died of cancer in Toulouse in November 2005. He is buried in Bram, in the Aude département.

From the time he came forward publicly until the end of his life, Seel was active as an advocate for the recognition of homosexual victims of the Nazis—and notably of the forgotten homosexual victims from the French territories of Alsace and Moselle, which had been annexed by Nazi Germany. Seel came to be known as the most outspoken activist among the men who had survived internment as homosexuals during the Third Reich. He was an active supporter of the Mémorial de la Déportation Homosexuelle, a French national association founded in 1989 to honor the memory of homosexuals persecuted by the Nazi regime and to advocate formal recognition of these victims in the ceremonies held annually to commemorate citizens and residents of France deported to the concentration camps.

Seel found himself repeatedly under attack in the 1980s and 1990s, even receiving death threats. After he appeared on French television, he was attacked and beaten by young men shouting anti-homosexual epithets. Catherine Trautmann, then the Mayor of Strasbourg and later a Socialist Party culture minister, once refused to shake his hand during a commemorative ceremony.

In 1994, Seel published the book Moi, Pierre Seel, déporté homosexuel (I, Pierre Seel, Deported Homosexual), written with the assistance of journalist and activist Jean Le Bitoux, founder of the long-running French gay periodical Gai Pied; the book subsequently appeared in translation in English, German, Spanish and Danish. Seel appeared on national television and in the national press in France. In June 1996, shortly before his autobiography appeared in German translation, Austria was the first German-speaking country he visited since World War II. He felt it important to visit the Austrian concentration camp site at Mauthausen with its memorial to homosexuals persecuted by the Nazi regime, the first of its kind worldwide when it was dedicated in 1984. He also paid his respects to fellow concentration survivor and activist, Josef Kohout (1915-1994) by visiting his grave in Vienna's Baumgartner Cemetery. In 1997, Seel spoke at the dedication of the memorial to homosexuals persecuted by the Nazi regime at Berlin's Nollendorfplatz.

== Legacy ==
Seel's story was featured in Paragraph 175 (2000), a documentary film on the Nazi persecution of homosexuals directed by San Francisco filmmakers Rob Epstein and Jeffrey Friedman. Seel received a five-minute standing ovation at the documentary's premiere at the Berlin film festival in February 2000. In 2001, he traveled to Vienna for the Austrian premiere of the same film.

In 2003, Seel received official recognition as a victim of the Holocaust by the International Organization for Migration's program for aiding Nazi victims. In April 2005, President Jacques Chirac, during the "Journée nationale du souvenir des victimes et des héros de la déportation" (the French equivalent to the Holocaust Memorial Day), said: "In Germany, but also on French territory, men and women whose personal lives were set aside, I am thinking of homosexuals, were hunted, arrested and deported." On 23 February 2008, the municipality of Toulouse renamed a street in the city in honour of Seel. The name plaque reads "Rue Pierre Seel - Déporté français pour homosexualité - 1923-2005".

In 2005, A Love to Hide (French title: Un amour à taire), a French made-for-television film, was released, directed by Christian Faure. It is loosely based on Seel's memoir Moi, Pierre Seel, déporté homosexuel and is dedicated to him.

In June 2019, Paris, France named a street Pierre Seel Street.

== Gallery ==
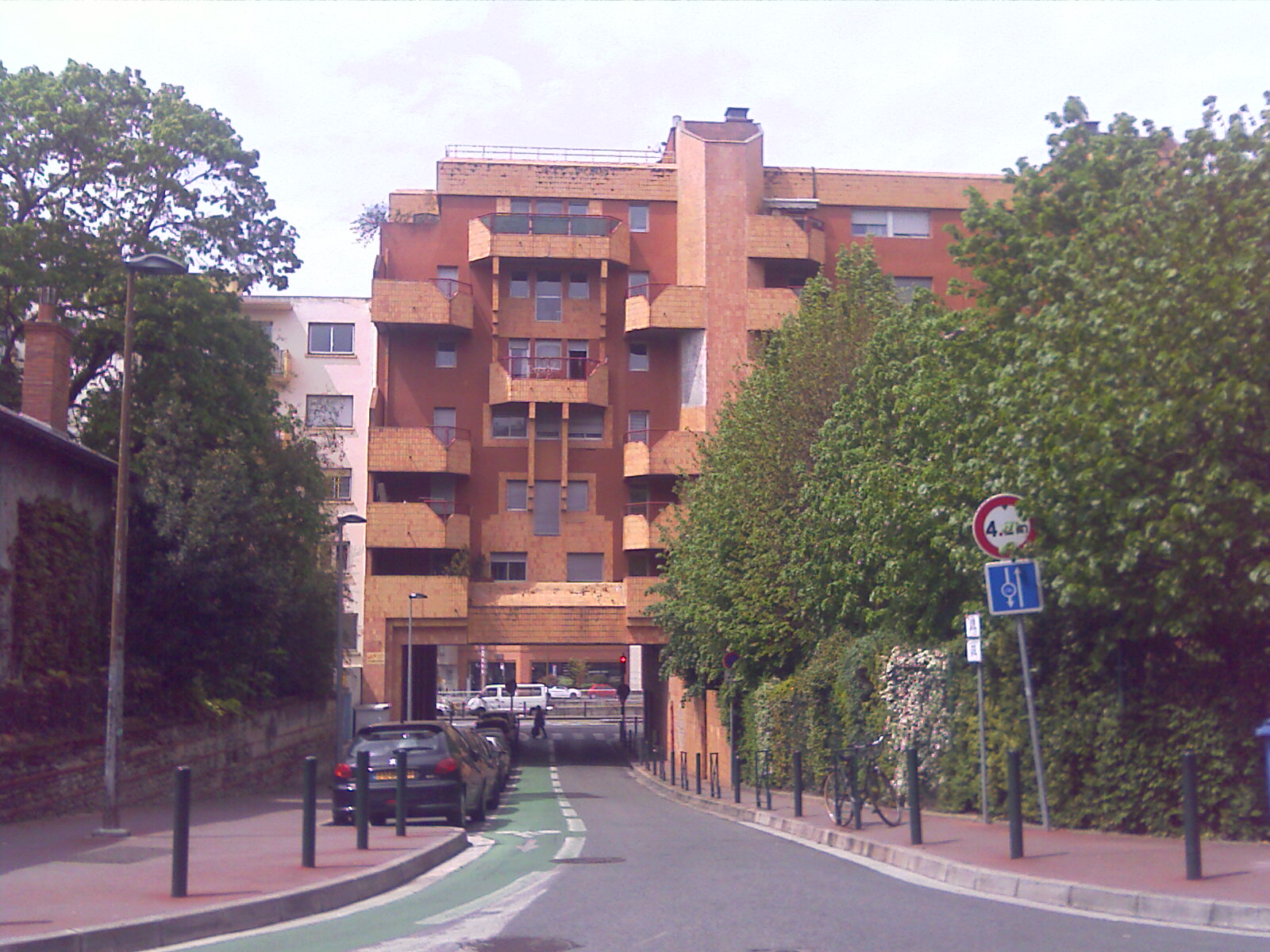
Rue Pierre Seel in Toulouse: street named after Pierre Seel

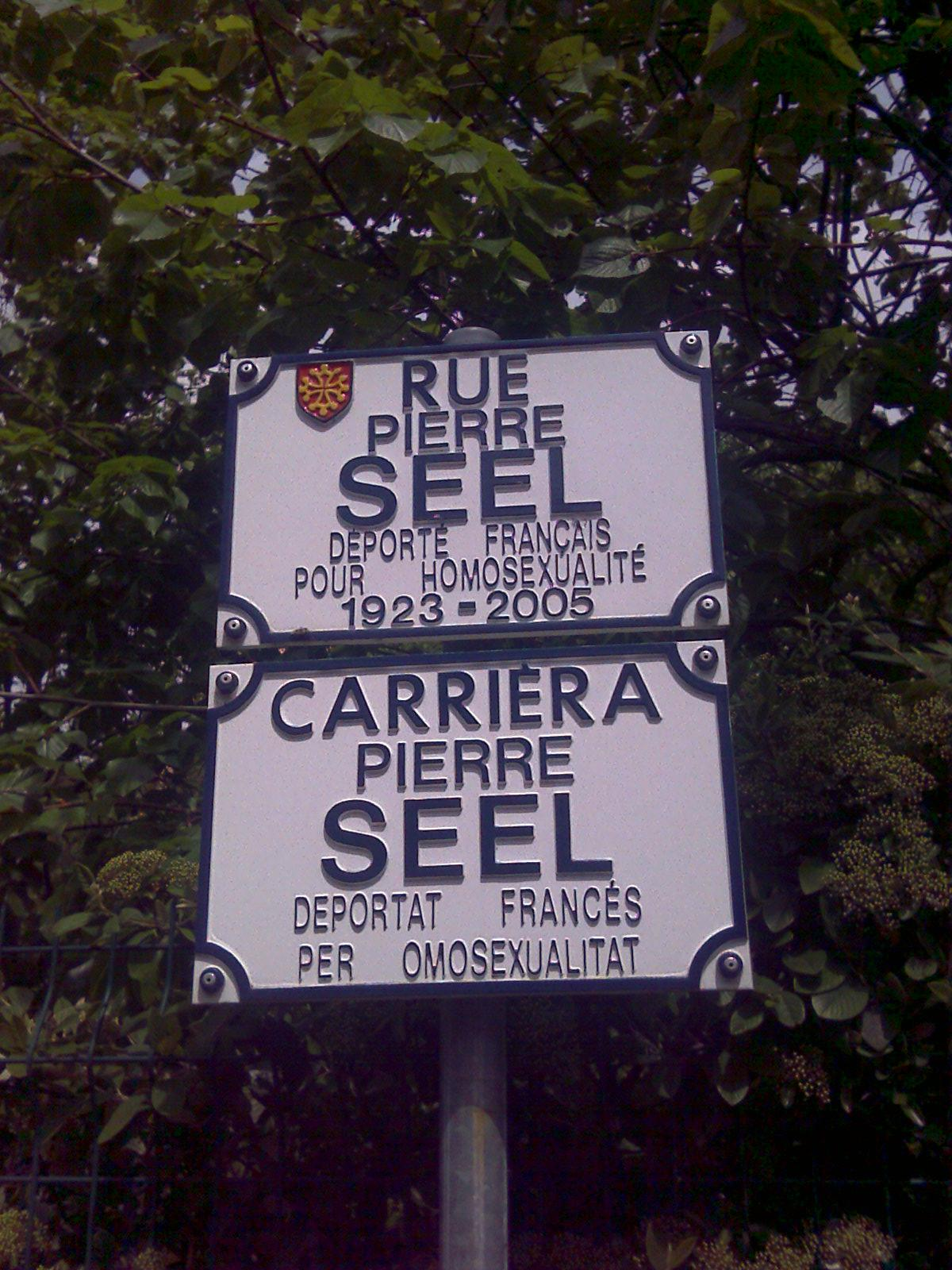
Pierre Seel Street plates, in Toulouse, both in French (top) and Occitan (bottom)

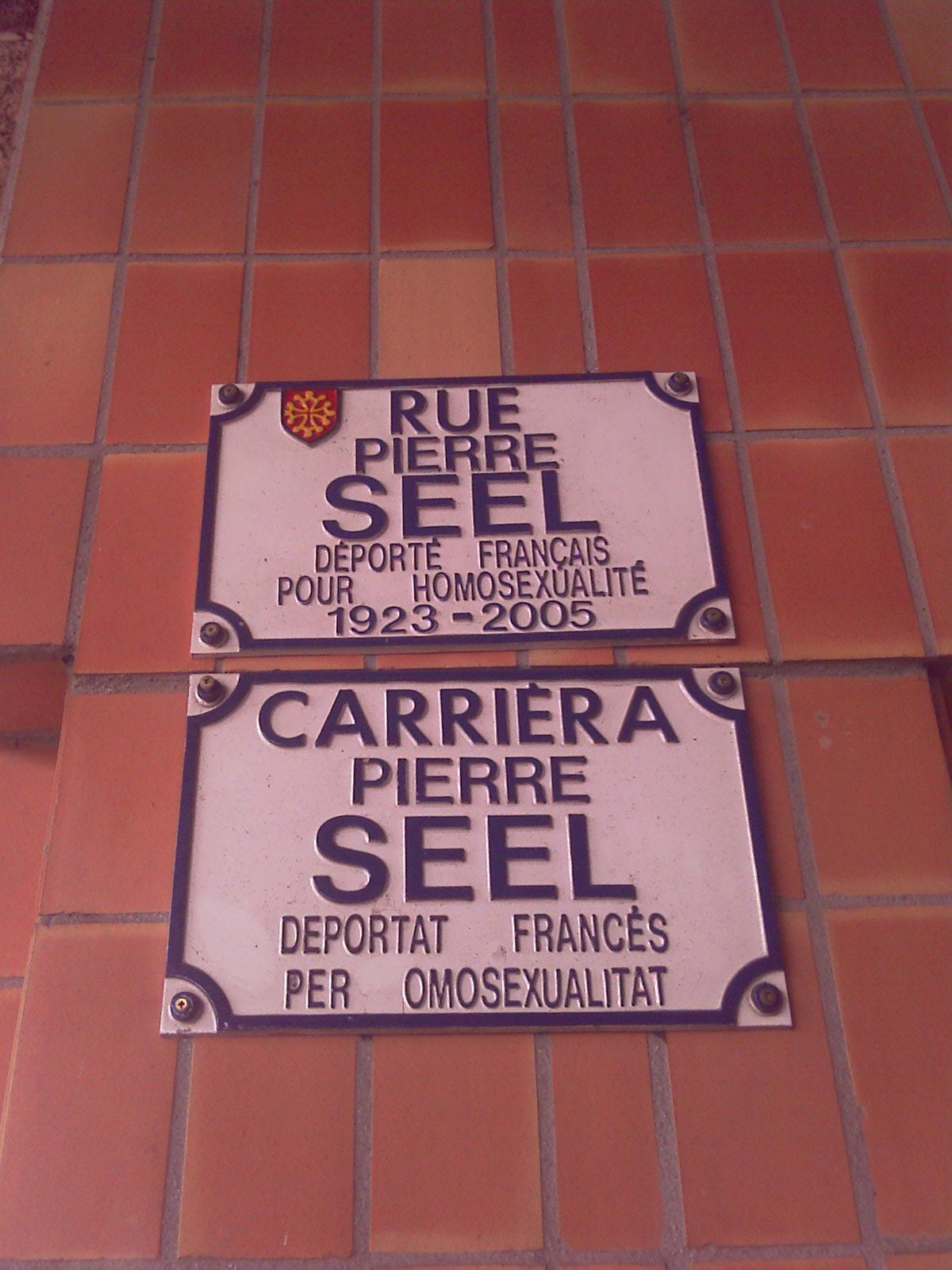
Another aspect of the Pierre Seel Street plates, in Toulouse

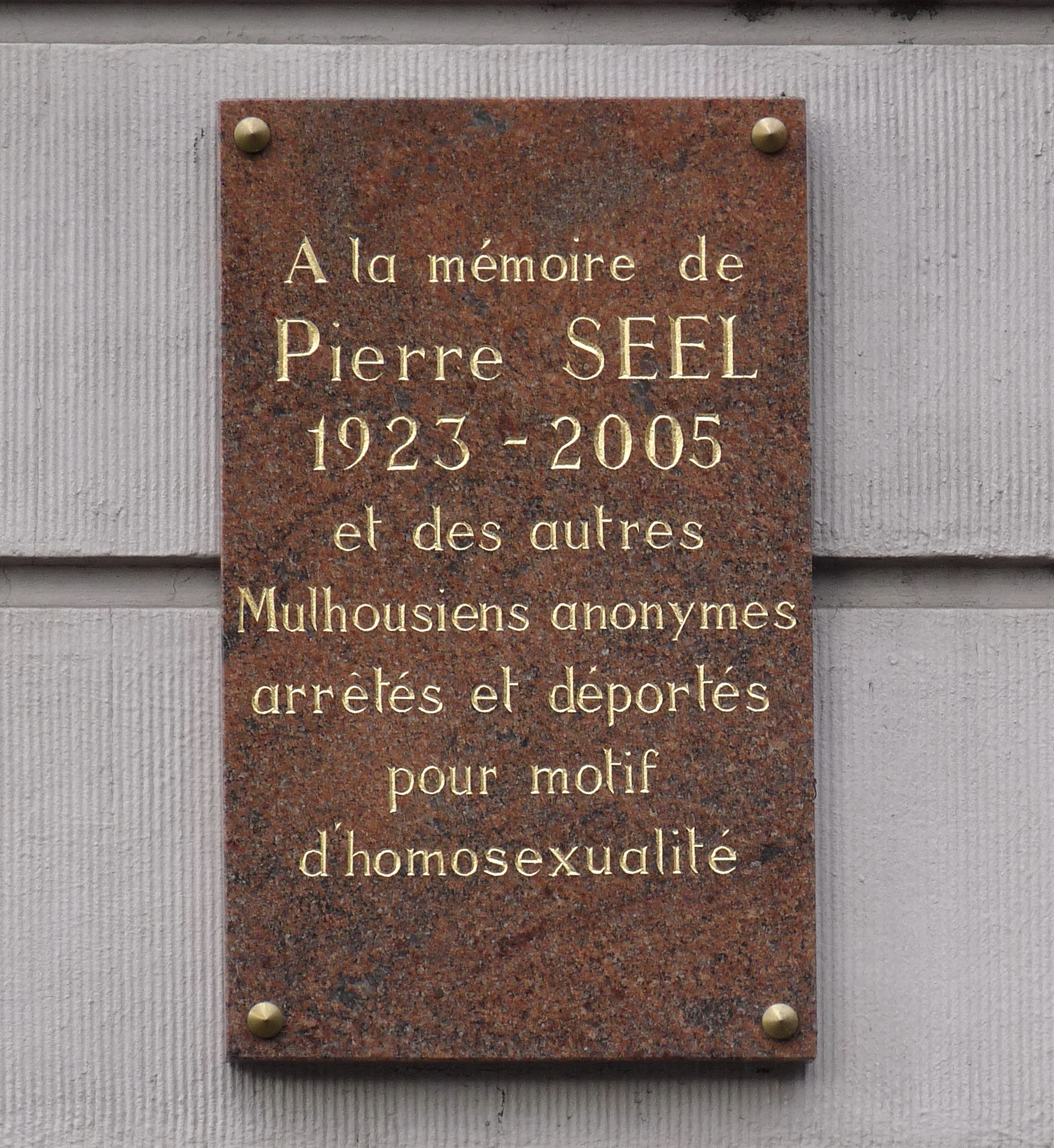
Memorial plate on a façade of the Mulhouse City Theatre

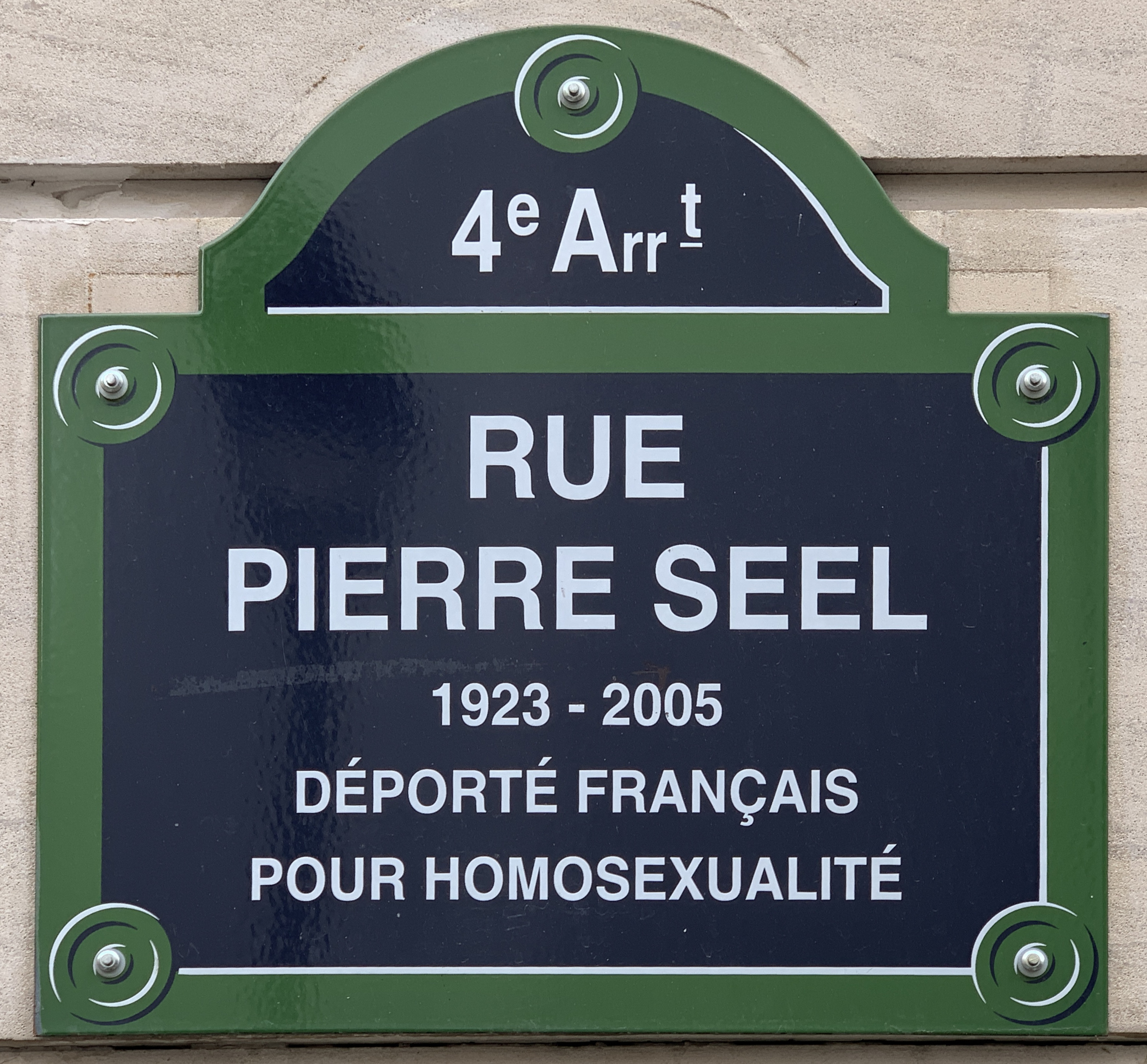
Street sign in Paris

== See also ==
- Gad Beck
- Albrecht Becker
- Rudolf Brazda
- Heinz Dörmer
- Karl Gorath
- Friedrich-Paul von Groszheim
- Wilhelm Heckmann
- Il Rosa Nudo, a film by Giovanni Coda based on Pierre Seel's autobiography.
- LGBT history in France
- LGBT rights in France
- Persecution of homosexuals in Nazi Germany and the Holocaust
- Kurt von Ruffin

== Bibliography ==
- Moi, Pierre Seel, déporté homosexuel, Éditions Calmann-Lévy (1994), ISBN 2-7021-2277-9
- I, Pierre Seel, Deported Homosexual, Basic Books (August 1, 1995), ISBN 0-465-04500-6, 208 pp
- Liberation Was for Others: Memoirs of a Gay Survivor of the Nazi Holocaust, Vol. 2, Joachim Neugroschel (Translator), Da Capo Press (April 1997), ISBN 0-306-80756-4, 576pp
- Les oubliés de la mémoire, Jean Le Bitoux, Hachette Littératures (24 avril 2002), ISBN 2-01-235625-7, 291pp
- De Pierre et de Seel, Pierre Seel and Hervé Joseph Lebrun, Create Space (2005), ISBN 1-4348-3696-7
