= Gad Beck =

Holocaust survivor, author

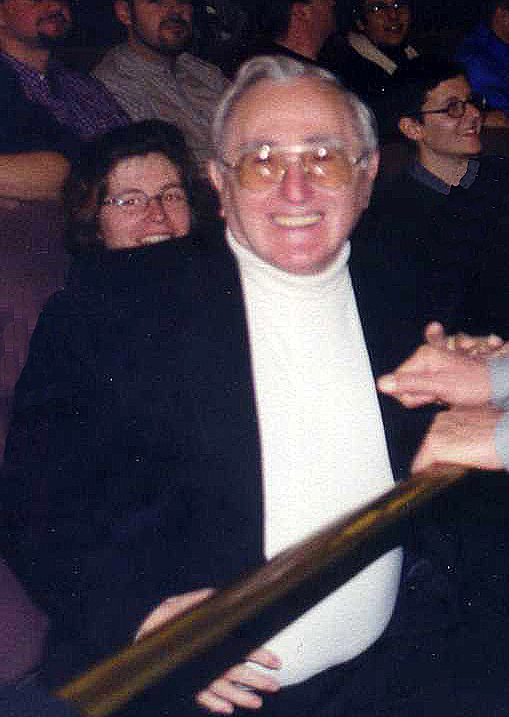
- Gad Beck in 2000
- Born: 30 June 1923; Berlin, Germany
- Died: 24 June 2012 (aged 88); Berlin, Germany
- Citizenship: German
- Occupations: Educator, activist, author
- Years active: 1947–2012
- Known for: An Underground Life: Memoirs of a Gay Jew in Nazi Berlin
- Partner(s): Julius Laufer (1977–2012; Beck's death)
- Family: Margot Beck (twin sister)

Gerhard "Gad" Beck (30 June 1923 – 24 June 2012) was an Israeli-German educator, author, activist, resistance member, and survivor of the Holocaust.

== Life and career ==
Gad Beck was born Gerhard Beck in Berlin, Germany, along with twin sister Margot, the son of Hedwig (née Kretschmar) and Heinrich Beck. His father was born Jewish, and his German mother, originally a Protestant, had converted to Judaism. The family lived in a predominantly Jewish immigrant section of the city. At age five, he and his family moved to the Weissensee district where he attended primary school and was the target of antisemitism from classmates. In 1934, he was enrolled in a Jewish school but had to quit and take a job as a shop attendant.

As a person of partial Jewish ancestry (a Mischling in Nazi terminology), Beck was not deported with other German Jews. Instead, he remained in Berlin. He recalls in his autobiography borrowing a neighbor's Hitler Youth uniform and marching in 1942 into the pre-deportation camp where his lover, Manfred Lewin, had been arrested and detained. He asked the commanding officer for the young man's release for use in a construction project, and it was granted. When outside the building, however, Lewin declined, saying, "Gad, I can't go with you. My family needs me. If I abandon them now, I could never be free." With that, the two parted without saying goodbye. "In those seconds, watching him go," Gad recalls, "I grew up." Lewin and his entire family were murdered at Auschwitz.

Gad Beck joined an underground effort to supply food and hiding places to Jews escaping to neutral Switzerland. In early 1945, a Jewish spy for the Gestapo betrayed him and some of his underground friends. He was subsequently interrogated and interned in a Jewish transit camp in Berlin. His parents and sister did survive the war, thanks to help from their Christian relatives on his mother's side.

After World War II, Beck helped organize efforts to enable Jewish survivors to emigrate to Israel, emigrating himself in 1947.

In the late 1970s, Beck met Julius Laufer. Eventually Laufer joined him in Israel, and the two were together for 35 years.

Beck returned to Berlin in 1979 where he was the director of the Jewish Adult Education Center in Berlin.

In 2000, Beck was featured, along with a few other gay Holocaust survivors, in the HBO documentary film Paragraph 175 in which he remembers his "great, great love" lost to the Nazis. Also in 2000, the English translation of Beck's 1995 autobiography, An Underground Life: Memoirs of a Gay Jew in Nazi Berlin, was published, leading to a successful book tour through the United States.

A documentary film on his life called "The Story of Gad Beck" was created by Carsten Does and Robin Cackett

Beck died from kidney failure at age 88, survived by his partner Laufer.

== Death ==
Beck died on 24 June 2012, in a Berlin retirement home at the age of 88. He is buried at the Jüdischer Friedhof on Heerstraße/Scholzplatz in Berlin.

== See also ==
- German Jews
- Homosexuality in Germany
- Persecution of homosexuals in Nazi Germany and the Holocaust
- Pierre Seel
- Albrecht Becker
- Heinz Dörmer
- Karl Gorath
- Wilhelm Heckmann
- Kurt von Ruffin
- Friedrich-Paul von Groszheim
