= Heinz Heger =

Concentration camp survivor (1915–1994)

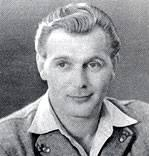
- Undated photo
- Born: 15 January 1915; Vienna, Austria-Hungary
- Died: 15 March 1994 (aged 79); Vienna, Austria
- Occupation: Writer
- Known for: Writing about the Nazi persecution of homosexuals
- Notable work: The Men With the Pink Triangle
- Partner: Wilhelm Kroepfl (1964–1994)

Josef Kohout (24 January 1915 – 15 March 1994) was an Austrian Nazi concentration camp survivor, imprisoned for his homosexuality. He is best known for the 1972 book Die Männer mit dem rosa Winkel (The Men With the Pink Triangle), which was written by his acquaintance Hans Neumann using the pen name Heinz Heger, which is often falsely attributed to Kohout. The book is one of very few first-hand accounts of the treatment of homosexuals in Nazi imprisonment. It has been translated into several languages, and a second edition published in 1994. It was the first testimony from a homosexual survivor of the concentration camps to be translated into English, and is regarded as the best known. Its publication helped to illuminate not just the suffering gay prisoners of the Nazi regime experienced, but the lack of recognition and compensation they received after the war's end.

Kohout's book inspired the 1979 play Bent, by Martin Sherman, which was made into the movie Bent, directed by Sean Mathias, in 1997.

== Biography ==
Kohout was born and grew up in Vienna. His mother and father were wealthy Catholics, and his father had a high-ranking job in the civil service. Kohout was arrested in March 1939, at age 24, when a Christmas card he had sent to his male lover, Fred, was intercepted. Fred, whose father was a high-ranking Nazi official, was deemed "mentally disturbed" and escaped punishment.

Several sources, including his own account, mention that the German penal code's Paragraph 175 was the basis of Kohout's incarceration. However, since he was convicted by an Austrian court and Paragraph 175 did not apply for Austrian citizens, he was convicted on basis of the Austrian penal code.

=== Incarceration ===
Kohout was interned in the Sachsenhausen concentration camp in January 1940 after having served a six-month sentence. In May 1940, Kohout was transferred from Sachsenhausen to Flossenbürg, in Bavaria, where he remained until his liberation in 1945.

He reported that homosexual prisoners were the most reviled of all the camp's detainees, and prevented from mutual association. Though the SS guards controlling the camp prevented the homosexual prisoners from associating with one another, sex between straight guards and gay prisoners nonetheless took place, with the guards construing such encounters as a "natural" expression of their "normal" sexuality in unusual circumstances. Kohout was selected for sexual services by a Kapo, and then the senior of his block. Florence Tamagne, a contemporary author on the history of homosexuals in Europe, describes these involvements as fortunate for Kohout; the protection of these relatively privileged men may have helped Kohout to survive.

Like other prisoners, Kohout was assigned futile tasks during his time in the camp, including using wheelbarrows to move the snow (and bare hands to move rocks) from one side of the compound to the other and back again. The repetition and pointlessness of the tasks were such that many prisoners committed suicide. Kohout observed the beating and the torture of prisoners, and theorized in his writings that the sadism of some of the SS officers reflected repressed homosexual desires of their own.

=== Liberation ===
Flossenbürg was liberated by the U.S. Army's 90th Infantry Division and the 97th Infantry Division on 23 April 1945. Kohout's journal entry for his final day in the camp reads "Amerikaner gekommen" ("Americans came").

He was eventually reunited with his mother. His father had committed suicide in 1942, leaving a note for his wife, Amalia, asking "May God protect our son".

In 1946 he met his partner, with whom he stayed until his death in 1994.

== The book ==
Hans Neumann conducted 15 interviews with Kohout between 1965 and 1967 and wrote the book on basis of these conversations using the pseudonym Heinz Heger. The book was eventually published in 1972 by Merlin Verlag. As well as describing the barbarism of life within the camp, Neumann/Heger's book offered criticism of the treatment of homosexual concentration camp survivors after liberation. After the camp's liberation, Kohout – like other homosexual prisoners – was still regarded as a criminal, since homosexuality remained illegal after the demise of the Nazi regime. He was not eligible for compensation and, despite attempts on his part, he received none from the West German government. Many other gay men who had survived concentration camps were returned to prison, and the time they had spent interned in the camps was not deducted from their sentences.

The book remains one of very few that document the experiences of homosexuals imprisoned by the Nazis. It is taught and read in college courses internationally, including at universities and Jewish seminaries.

Erik Jensen, writing in the Journal of the History of Sexuality, identifies the publication of Kohout's memoir as a turning point in the history of the gay community, when the activists of the 1960s and 1970s began to take account of the perspectives of the preceding generation and to embrace the pink triangle as a symbol of gay identity.

== Legacy ==
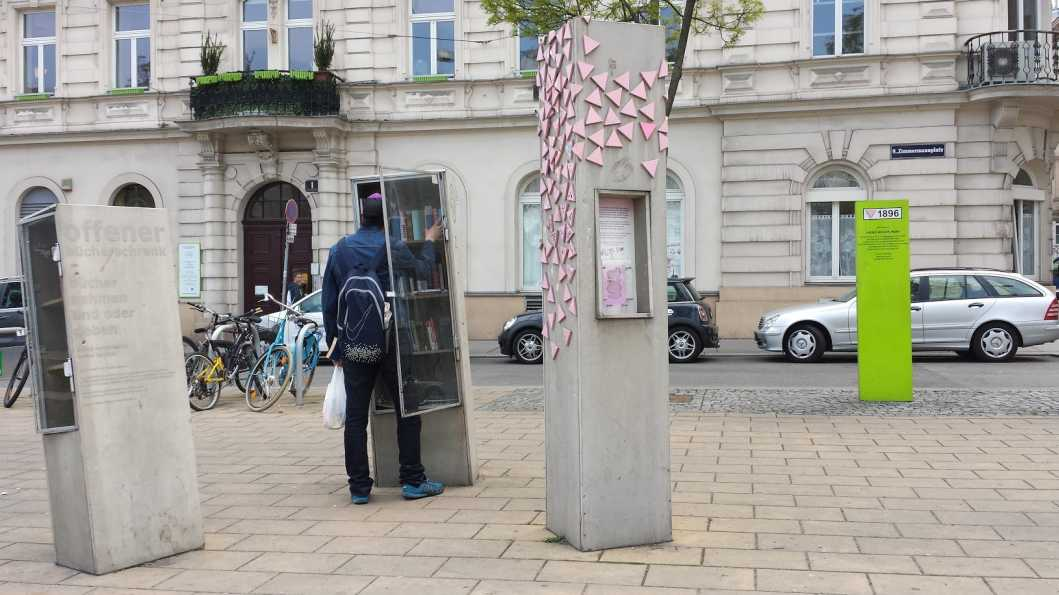
Heinz Heger Park Vienna 2016

Kohout died in Vienna, and certain items of his possessions were donated by his partner to the United States Holocaust Memorial Museum. He included Kohout's journals from the camp, a number of letters sent by his parents that never reached him while he was imprisoned, and the cloth strip with the pink triangle and his prisoner number that he had been forced to wear. It was the first pink triangle belonging to an identifiable individual that was collected by a museum.

== See also ==
- Persecution of homosexuals in Nazi Germany
- Pierre Seel – a French, LGBT, Nazi-persecuted writer
