= Annette Eick =

Jewish lesbian writer (b. 1909, d. 2010)

Annette Eick (13 September 1909 – 25 February 2010) was a Jewish Lesbian author and poet.

== Biography ==
Annette Eick was born 13 September 1909, in Berlin.

During the 1920s, a liberal time period in the Weimar republic, Eick wrote poems and short stories for lesbian magazines, including Garçonne. After the Nazis came to power in 1933, she had to give up on journalism and started working as a nanny. In 1938, she was granted a visum to live in the UK and fled to London after surviving an attack by Nazis on the farm she was staying at during the Reichskristallnacht. Her parents were murdered in the Auschwitz concentration camp.

In London, Eick worked as a nanny and housekeeper and met her partner Getrud Klingel. They moved to Devon, where they opened a nursery and Eick started writing again. Her collection of poems, Immortal Muse, was published in 1984 and turned into a short film called The Immortal Muse by Jules Hussey in 2005.

Eick became known to a wider audience after being featured, alongside five gay men, in the documentary ‘Paragraph 175’ from 2000, which told of their prosecutions under the paragraph 175 which criminalised homosexuality. Most of Eick's work, however, remains unpublished.

She died 25 February 2010, in Devon.
