= Paragraph 175 (film) =

2000 documentary by Rob Epstein and Jeffrey Friedman

- Directed by: Rob Epstein; Jeffrey Friedman
- Written by: Sharon Wood
- Produced by: Rob Epstein; Jeffrey Friedman; Michael Ehrenzweig; Janet Cole
- Starring: Rupert Everett; Gad Beck; Heinz Dormer
- Narrated by: Rupert Everett
- Cinematography: Bernd Meiners
- Edited by: Dawn Logsdon
- Music by: Tibor Szemző
- Production company: Channel Four Films
- Distributed by: New Yorker Films
- Release date: January 22, 2000; United States
- Running time: 81 minutes
- Countries: United Kingdom; Germany; United States
- Languages: French; English; German

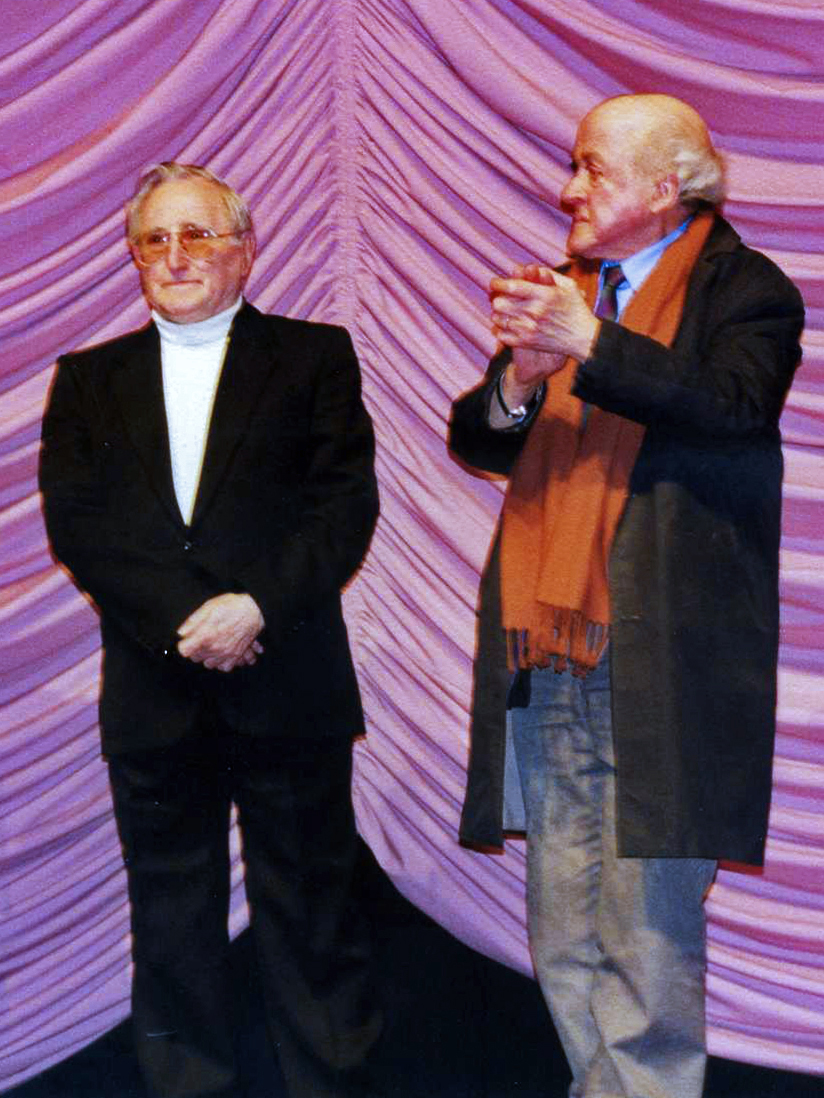
Gad Beck (left) and Pierre Seel at the German premiere of Paragraph 175 in Berlin (2000)

Paragraph 175 is a 2000 documentary film, directed by Rob Epstein and Jeffrey Friedman, and narrated by Rupert Everett. The film was produced by Rob Epstein, Jeffrey Friedman, Janet Cole, Michael Ehrenzweig, Sheila Nevins and Howard Rosenman.

== Summary ==
The film chronicles the lives of several gay men and one lesbian who were persecuted by the Nazis. The gay men were arrested by the Nazis for the crime of homosexuality under Paragraph 175, the sodomy provision of the German penal code, dating back to 1871. Between 1933 and 1945, 100,000 men were arrested under Paragraph 175. Some were imprisoned, others were sent to concentration camps. Only about 4,000 survived. In 2000, fewer than ten of these men were known to be living. Five come forward in the documentary to tell their stories for the first time, considered to be among the last untold stories of the Third Reich.

Paragraph 175 tells of a gap in the historical record and reveals the lasting consequences, as told through personal stories of gay men and women who lived through it, including: Karl Gorath; Gad Beck, the Jewish resistance fighter who spent the war helping refugees escape Berlin; Annette Eick, a Jewish lesbian who escaped to England with the help of a woman she loved; Albrecht Becker, German Christian photographer, who was arrested and imprisoned for homosexuality, then joined the army on his release because he "wanted to be with men"; and Pierre Seel, the Alsatian teenager, who watched as his lover was eaten alive by dogs in the camps.

== Reception ==
On review aggregator website Rotten Tomatoes, the film holds an approval rating of 95% based on 19 reviews, with an average rating of 7.4/10.

== Awards ==
- Teddy Award for best documentary film, 2000

== See also ==
- Persecution of homosexuals in Nazi Germany and the Holocaust
