= Wilhelm Heckmann =

German musician (1897–1995)

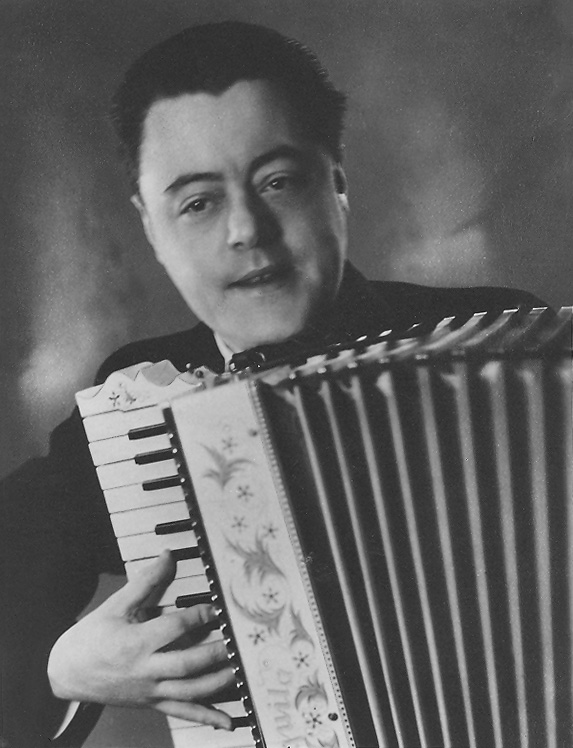
- Wilhelm Heckmann
- Born: 26 June 1897; Dortmund-Wellinghofen, German Empire
- Died: 10 March 1995 (aged 97); Wuppertal, Germany
- Military career
- Allegiance: German Empire
- Branch: Imperial German Army
- Service years: 1914–1918
- Conflicts: World War I; Western Front
- Other work: Musician; Holocaust survivor

Wilhelm Heckmann (26 June 1897 – 10 March 1995) was a German concert and easy listening musician. From 1937 to 1945, he was imprisoned in the Nazi concentration camps in Dachau and Mauthausen. Heckmann founded the first prisoner band in Mauthausen, and was also instrumental in the founding of the large prisoner orchestra there.

== Biography ==
The son of innkeeper Adolf Heckmann, Willi Heckmann grew up in the public house environs of Altena (Westphalia). During World War I, he served in the Patriotic Emergency Services and the military. After the war, Heckmann studied vocals and piano with Otto Laugs at the state conservatory in Hagen (Westphalia).

During the 1920s, he was a guest performer as the "Rhineland Tenor" in Wuppertal, Altena, Rheydt, Zurich and Berlin. He was also a silent film musician in the "Zentraltheater" in Altena and the "Thalia" in Wuppertal. During the early 1930s, he was a guest performer in Stuttgart, Gotha and Düsseldorf. Beginning in 1934, the Nazi government implemented a policy of "Gleichschaltung," which brought professional musicians into line according to race. So-called degenerate music ("Entartete Musik") was ostracized and popular, easy listening music ("Schlager") was promoted. The music magazine "Das Deutsche Podium, Kampfblatt für deutsche Musik" ("The German Podium, Fighting Paper of German Music") increasingly lauded Heckmann: “… during the course of several months, he has won over a large base of friends and supporters … with his fine, well-trained tenor voice …” “… Willi Heckmann – an all-around musical talent … his volume fills the room … piano playing, a pleasant chord, well-trained vocals, Herr Heckmann has it all …”

Additional performances and engagements in Stuttgart, Gotha, Munich, Patenkirchen and Passau followed. On 29 July 1937, the Gestapo suddenly arrested Heckmann in Passau without prior warning and without a warrant. With reference to Paragraph 175 (the homosexual article), he was interrogated and sent into protective custody ("Schutzhaft") at the Dachau concentration camp for a previous episode of homosexuality. To this day, the exact details of his confinement in the concentration camp remain unclear.

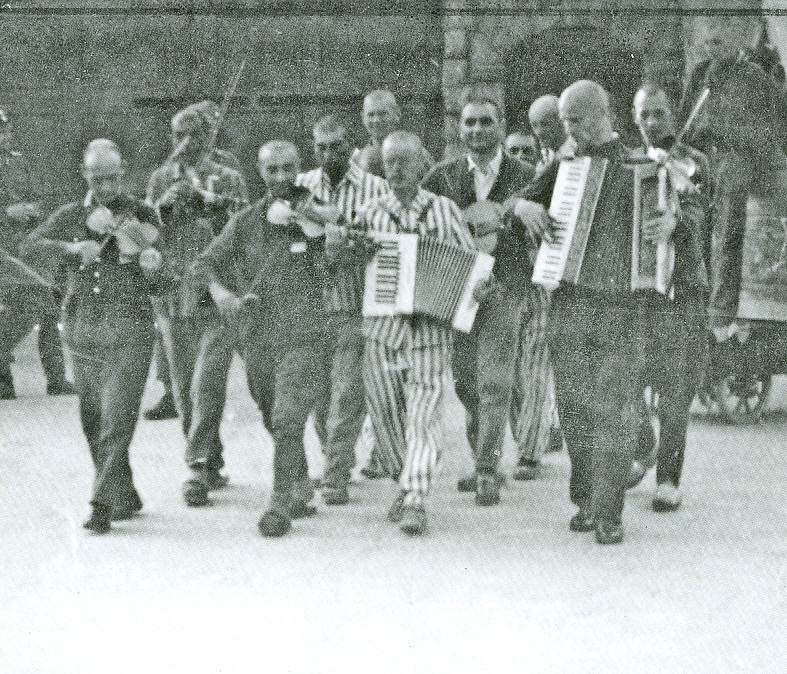
Mauthausen Concentration Camp band (Wilhelm Heckmann playing the small accordion), 30 July 1942

At the outbreak of World War II, Heckmann was transferred to the Mauthausen Concentration Camp in Austria, where he remained until the Allied liberation of the camp on 5 May 1945. In Mauthausen, he worked in the "Viennese Trench" quarry. Beginning around 1940, he was allowed to start up a musical trio, which had to perform a variety of musical styles for high-ranking guests in the casino. When the photography division of the SS photographed the "Gypsy Orchestra" on 30 July 1942 as it was led through the camp together with the recaptured prisoner Hans Bonarewitz, Willi Heckmann was in the front row, setting the tone. To his right (playing the large accordion) is the post office Kapo Georg Streitwolf. Following his visit in the autumn of 1942, Heinrich Himmler ordered the establishment of a camp orchestra, which was assembled "with the help of Heckmann, Rumbauer and a Czech doctor." Until the liberation of the camp, this orchestra played military marches, as well as popular and serious music on a regular basis. "Willi Heckmann was the singer and accordion player." His participation in the orchestra made Heckmann a kind of functionary among the prisoners, and spared him the harshest jobs in the concentration camp. Instead, he was dispatched to commandoes with easier tasks such as transportation and disinfection. The SS leaders clearly exploited Heckmann's musical talents to emotionally influence life in the camp.

Following his release from the concentration camp, Heckmann struggled to regain a foothold as a professional musician. Years of heavy labour in the Mauthausen quarry left him with rheumatism and inflamed nerves in his shoulders and arms, which hampered his efforts to practice his profession. In 1954, he applied for compensation for his time spent in Dachau and Mauthausen. But his application was denied in 1960 with the remark that he was, "only imprisoned as a homosexual because of crimes against Paragraph 175 of the penal code." This did not qualify him for any kind of restitution.

From 1945 to 1964, Wilhelm Heckmann worked as a professional musician and solo entertainer in various hotels and restaurants throughout Germany. He died in Wuppertal on 10 March 1995 at the age of 97.

== Literature ==
- Guido Fackler: Music in Concentration Camps 1933–1945. In: Music & Politics, 2007. (in English)
- Klaus Stanjek: Music and murder – a professional musician in Mauthausen. In: Andreas Baumgartner, Isabella Girstmair, Verena Kaselitz (editors): The Spirit is free. Band 2. edition Mauthausen, Wien 2008, ISBN 978-3-902605-01-6 (in English)
- Kurt Lettner: Musik zwischen Leben und Tod. In: Oberösterr. Heimatblätter 2000, Heft 1,2; S. 55–72. (in German)
- Milan Kuna: Musik an der Grenze des Lebens. Zweitausendeins, Frankfurt/M 1993, ISBN 3-86150-018-3 (in German)
- Simon Hirt, Hansjörg Stecher: Musik zwischen subversivem Überlebens- und brutalem Terrorinstrument. In: Die Aussteller und das Bundesministerium des Inneren (Hrsg.): Kunst und Kultur im Konzentrationslager Mauthausen 1938–1945. Wien 2007. (in German)
- Leoncarlo Settimelli: La storia angosciosa di una foto terribile. In: patria indipendente, 24 gennaio 2010. (in Italian)

== See also ==
- Nazi Germany
- Persecution of homosexuals in Nazi Germany and the Holocaust
- Paragraph 175
- Pink triangle
- Mauthausen-Gusen concentration camp
- Rudolf Brazda
- Pierre Seel
