= Gai pied =

French gay magazine

Gai pied or Gai pied hebdo was a monthly, then weekly (hence the name Hebdo), French gay magazine, founded by Jean Le Bitoux. Its name, which literally means "Gay foot", is a homophone of guêpier, which means a hornet's nest or, figuratively, a trap or pitfall — a reference to the magazine's determination to torment the status-quo.

== History and profile ==
The magazine's name was suggested by Michel Foucault, who wrote an article for the first issue and continued to contribute material to the magazine throughout its existence.

The first issue was sold at two thousand kiosks throughout France on 1 April 1979. It was published by Pink Triangle publications and printed by the Revolutionary Communist League.

Among the magazine's collaborators were Yves Navarre, Tony Duvert, Gianni De Martino, Guy Hocquenghem, Renaud Camus, Alain Pacadis, Copi, Hugo Marsan, Emmanuel Dreuilhe and others. The magazine enjoyed great success among French gays, and increased their visibility. Apart from its articles, the magazine published personal ads and erotic photographs.

In 1980, Jean-Paul Sartre agreed to an interview with the magazine, as did artists David Hockney and Barbara and politicians Pierre Bérégovoy and Gaston Defferre, showing their support for the magazine's cause.

In 1987, minister of the interior Charles Pasqua attempted to ban the publication of Gai pied. A demonstration on 19 March, along with statements of support from many public figures including minister of culture François Léotard, prevented the ban.

Between 1987 and 1990 the magazine controlled FG DJ Radio.

Despite early success, the magazine struggled to respond to the menace of AIDS, and was dealt a financial blow by the success of Minitel. After losing much of its readership, the magazine ended publication in 1991.

== See also ==
- Illico
- Têtu
