= Jean Le Bitoux =

French journalist (1948–2010)

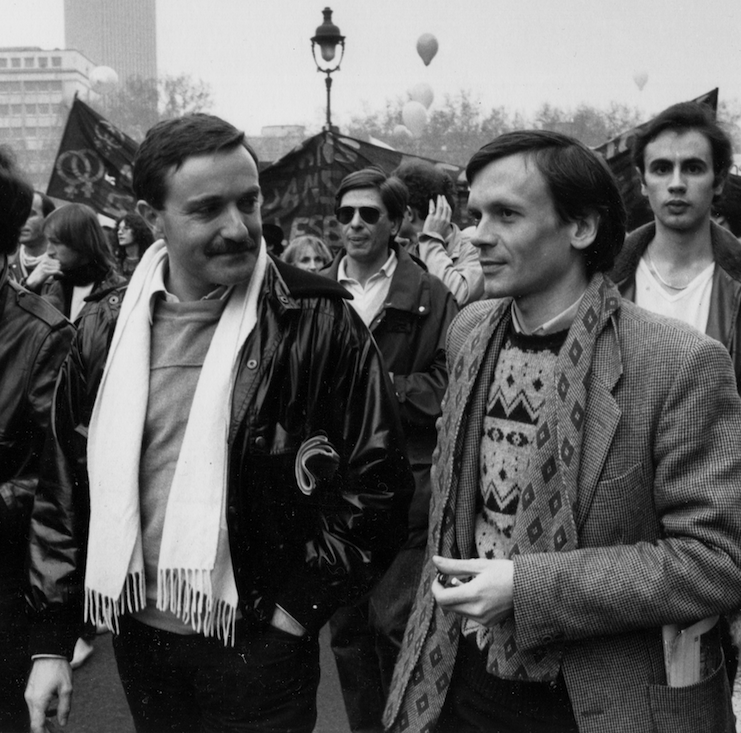
- Jean Le Bitoux (right) with Yves Navarre, 1981
- Born: 16 August 1948; Bordeaux, France
- Died: 21 April 2010 (age 61); Paris, France
- Resting place: Père Lachaise Cemetery
- Occupation: Journalist

Jean Le Bitoux (16 August 1948 – 21 April 2010) was a French journalist and gay activist. He was the founder of Gai pied, the first mainstream gay magazine in France. He was a campaigner for Holocaust remembrance of homosexual victims. He was the author of several books about homosexuality.

== Early life ==
Jean Le Bitoux was born on 16 August 1948 in Bordeaux, France. His father was an admiral.

== Career ==
Le Bitoux worked as a substitute music teacher.

Le Bitoux founded the Front homosexuel d'action révolutionnaire (FHAR) in Nice in the 1970s. By 1978, he ran for the National Assembly as a "homosexual candidate" alongside Guy Hocquenghem; they lost the election.

In 1979, Le Bitoux founded Gai pied, the first long-running commercially published gay magazine in France. Its name, coined by philosopher Michel Foucault, literally means "gay foot," but constitutes a multilayered pun in French: The two words pronounced together sound like "guêpier" (hornet's nest), while the word "foot" also evokes a "kick in the ass" ("un pied au cul") and sexual pleasure ("prendre son pied," equivalent to "to get off"). Le Bitoux resigned from the publication in 1983 due to the magazine's increasingly consumerist orientation.

Le Bitoux joined AIDES, an HIV/AIDS awareness non-profit organization, in 1985. He co-wrote many HIV prevention documents. He was the editor-in-chief of the Journal du Sida, a publication about HIV/AIDS.

In 1989, Le Bitoux founded the Mémorial de la Déportation Homosexuelle, a nonprofit organization for the remembrance of homosexual victims of Nazi Germany9. Initially, the organization was met with homophobia from some Holocaust survivors, who wrongly feared they were being smeared. In 1994, Le Bitoux co-authored the memoir of Pierre Seel, a French homosexual who was deported by the Nazis for being gay.

By the 1990s, Le Bitoux argued that anti-homosexual legislation in France harked back to laws devised by François Darlan of the Vichy government to end same-sex prostitution in 1942, not Nazi Germany. However, Marc Boninchi, a Law professor at the University of Lyon, has argued that the first instance of legal discrimination dates back to prosecutor Charles Dubost's 1941 recommendations. Meanwhile, Le Bitoux's 2002 Les oubliés de la mémoire led President Jacques Chirac to acknowledge the homosexual victims of persecution under the Nazi Regime.

Le Bitoux was a co-founder of the Centre LGBT Paris-Île-de-France in 1991.

== Personal life ==
Le Bitoux was openly gay, and was rejected by his family for being gay. Drawn to Maoism in his early twenties, he also left due to homophobia. He contracted HIV/AIDS in the early 1980s.

== Death ==
Le Bitoux died on 21 April 2010 in Paris, France. A memorial service conducted by Patrick Bloche was held in his honor at the city hall of the 11th arrondissement of Paris, with a performance by the Sisters of Perpetual Indulgence. He was buried at the Père Lachaise Cemetery.

== Works ==
- Le Bitoux, Jean; Seel, Pierre (1994). Moi, Pierre Seel, déporté homosexuel. Paris: Calmann-Lévy. ISBN 9782702122778. OCLC 30927212.
- Le Bitoux, Jean (2002). Les oubliés de la mémoire. Paris: Hachette littératures. ISBN 9782012356252. OCLC 50541993.
- Chevaux, Hervé; Le Bitoux, Jean; Proth, Bruno (2003). Citoyen de seconde zone : trente ans de lutte pour la reconnaissance de l'homosexualité en France (1971-2002). Paris: Hachette Littératures. ISBN 9782012355682. OCLC 402382714.
- Le Bitoux, Jean (2005). Entretiens sur la question gay. Béziers: H & O. ISBN 9782845470989. OCLC 60596632.
