= Yves Navarre =

French writer (1940–1994)

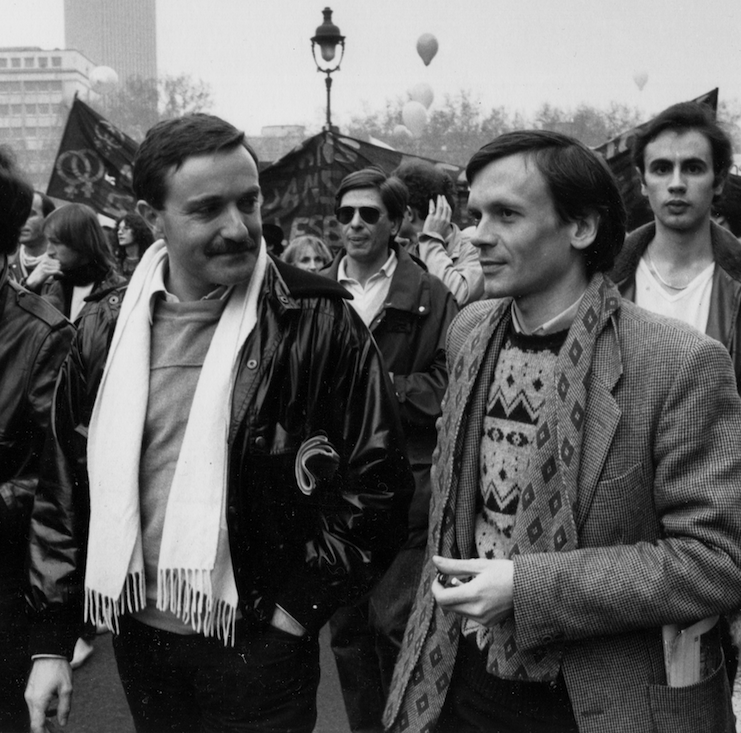
- Yves Navarre (left) with Jean Le Bitoux, 1981
- Born: 24 September 1940; Condom, Gers, France
- Died: 24 January 1994 (aged 53)
- Occupation: Author

Yves Navarre (French pronunciation: [iv navaʁ]; 24 September 1940, Condom, Gers – 24 January 1994) was a French writer. A gay man, most of his work concerned homosexuality and associated issues, such as AIDS. In his romantic works, Navarre was noted for his tendency to emphasize sensuality and "the mystical qualities of love" rather than sexuality or sensationalism. He was awarded the 1980 Prix Goncourt for his novel Le Jardin d'acclimatation.

== Biography ==
Born in Condom, he studied Spanish, English, and French literature at the University of Lille, earning degrees in 1961 and 1964. The following year, he studied at the Ecole des Hautes Etudes Commerciales du Nord. He then worked for an ad agency as a creative writer.

He began submitting works to publishers in 1958, although it was not until 1971 that his first novel, Lady Black, was published. This was followed in 1973 by Les Loukoums, which tells the story of a malady afflicting a group of New Yorkers. A string of novels followed, often – as in Le Petit Galopin de nos corps, 1977 and Portrait de Julien devant la fenêtre, 1979 – about love affairs between two male characters. He also wrote works of drama, such as Il pleut : si on tuait papa-maman, La Guerre des piscines, and Les Dernières clientes.

For Le Jardin d'acclimatation, the story of a young well-born man lobotomized and then imprisoned for his homosexuality, Navarre was awarded the Prix Goncourt in 1980. He became François Mitterrand's main advocate in the gay community during the 1981 and 1988 elections, although as a novelist and not a politician, he felt misunderstood and ineffective in the role.

In 1984, Navarre suffered a stroke. He did not publish any more works until 1986.

Between 1990 and 1993 he lived in Montreal, Quebec. His 1992 novel Ce sont amis que vent emporte tells the story of a sculptor, Roch, in a relationship with a dancer, David. The novel recounts their struggle against AIDS. After his return to France, he killed himself with barbiturates on 24 January 1994.

== Works ==
=== Novels ===
- Lady Black, Flammarion, 1971.
- Evolène, Flammarion, 1972.
- Les Loukoums, Flammarion, 1973.
- Le Cœur qui cogne, Flammarion, 1974.
- Killer : roman, Flammarion, 1975.
- Plum Parade : vingt-quatre heures de la vie d'un mini-cirque, Flammarion, 1975.
- Niagarak, Grasset, 1976.
- Le Petit Galopin de nos corps, (published in 1977 by Robert Laffont), recently republished with a preface by Serge Hefez in the collection "Classiques H&O poche", Béziers : H&O, 2005. 10,8 x 17,8 cm. 256 pages. ISBN 2-84547-109-2
- Kurwenal ou la Part des êtres, Robert Laffont, 1977.
- Je vis où je m'attache, Robert Laffont, 1978.
- Le Temps voulu, Flammarion, 1979. Published in English as Our Share of Time by Dalkey Archive Press in 1987.
- Portrait de Julien devant sa fenêtre, Robert Laffont, 1979; H&O, 2006.
- Le Jardin d'acclimatation, Flammarion, 1980.
- Romances sans paroles, Flammarion, 1982.
- Premières Pages, Flammarion, 1983.
- L'Espérance de beaux voyages, 1 : Eté-automne, Flammarion, 1984.
- Phénix, le paysage regarde, illustrated by Jean Dieuzaide and Lucien Clergue, P. Montel, 1984.
- Louise, Flammarion, 1985.
- Fête des mères, Albin Michel, 1987.
- Romans, un roman, Albin Michel, 1988
- Hôtel Styx, Albin Michel, 1989.
- Douce France, Québec, Leméac, 1990.
- La Terrasse des audiences au moment de l'adieu, Montréal, Leméac, 1990.
- Ce sont amis que vent emporte, Flammarion, 1991.
- La Vie dans l'âme, carnets , Montréal, Le Jour / VLB, 1992.
- Poudre d'or, Flammarion, 1993.
- Dernier dimanche avant la fin du siècle, Flammarion, 1994.
- La Ville Atlantique, Leméac, 1996.
- Dialogue de sourdes, Nice, La Traverse, 1999.
- La Dame du fond de la cour, Montréal, Leméac, 2000.
- Avant que tout me devienne insupportable, H&O, 2006.

=== Drama ===
- Théâtre, three volumes, Flammarion, 1974, 1976, 1982.

=== Autobiography ===
- Biographie, Flammarion, 1981.
- Une vie de chat, Albin Michel, 1986.
- Un condamné à vivre s'est échappé, textes, entretiens et poèmes, with Pierre Salducci, Hull [Québec], Vents d'Ouest, 1997.

== Bibliography ==
« La tendresse tue. L'absence de tendresse assassine. »
