= Friedrich-Paul von Groszheim =

German businessman (1906–2006)

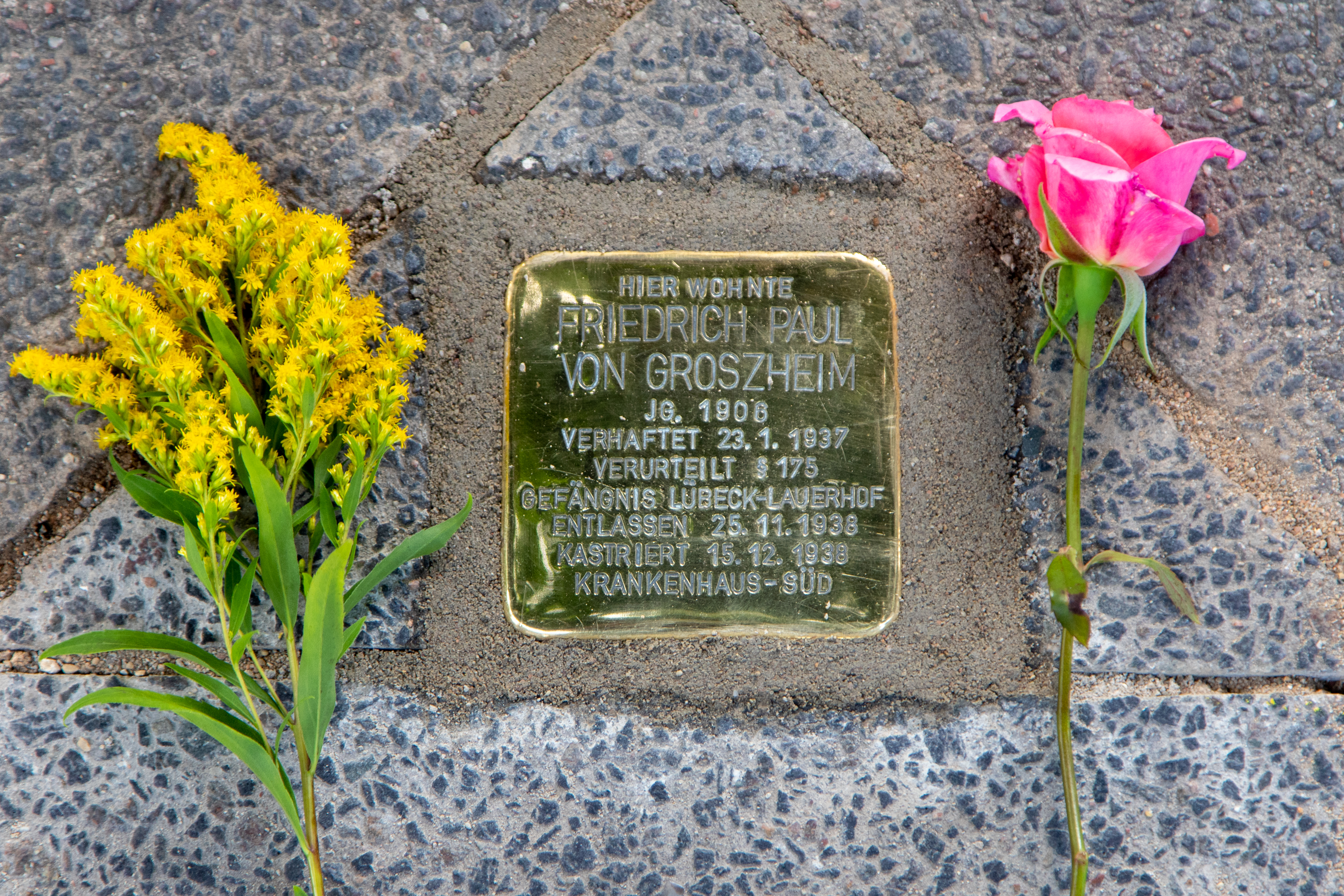
Stolperstein for Friedrich-Paul von Groszheim

Friedrich-Paul von Groszheim (27 April 1906 – 6 January 2006) was a German man who was imprisoned and castrated by the Nazis for the crime of homosexuality under Germany's now-repealed Paragraph 175. He was born in Lübeck, Germany.

== Life ==
Friedrich von Groszheim came from an upper-class Lübeck family. His father died in 1917 during the First World War, as did his mother some time later, so that he and his sister were raised by two aunts.

Von Groszheim trained as a wholesale merchant and was already regularly active in the gay scene in his hometown in the 1920s.

== Imprisonment ==
In January 1937 Von Groszheim was one of 230 men arrested in Lübeck on suspicion of homosexuality by the SS and was imprisoned for around ten months on the basis of Section 175, during which he had to wear a badge emblazoned with a capital A, for Arschficker ("arse-fucker"):

They beat us to a pulp. I couldn't lie down...my whole back was bloody.

He was arrested again in 1938 and was humiliated, tortured, and given the choice to either be castrated or deported to Sachsenhausen concentration camp. He agreed to the castration. In 1940, he was decommissioned due to his lack of fitness and declared unfit for military service.

In 1943, he was imprisoned again, this time in a satellite camp of Neuengamme concentration camp, for having been a monarchist and supporter of Kaiser Wilhelm II.

After the war and the collapse of the Third Reich, he moved to Hamburg, where he worked as a hotel clerk until his retirement.

He took part in several documentaries and spoke for the first time about his homosexuality and his suffering in prison around 45 years after the end of the war.

His time in prison and in the Neuengamme concentration camp were not recognized by the Federal Republic of Germany during his lifetime.

With his death in 2006, it was assumed that the last homosexual concentration camp survivor in Germany had died, until Rudolf Brazda was found. Brazda died around five years later.

Since 19 August 2021, a memorial stone has commemorated Friedrich Paul von Groszheim in front of his house at Kaiserallee 11 in Lübeck-Travemünde.

== After the war ==
Von Groszheim settled in Hamburg, Germany. In 1995, he was one of eight signers of a declaration given to the US Holocaust Memorial Museum in Washington, D.C. that called for the "memorializing and documenting of Nazi atrocities against homosexuals and others."

== See also ==
- Karl Gorath
- Persecution of homosexuals in Nazi Germany and the Holocaust
