= Albrecht Becker =

German designer, actor and photographer (1906–2002)

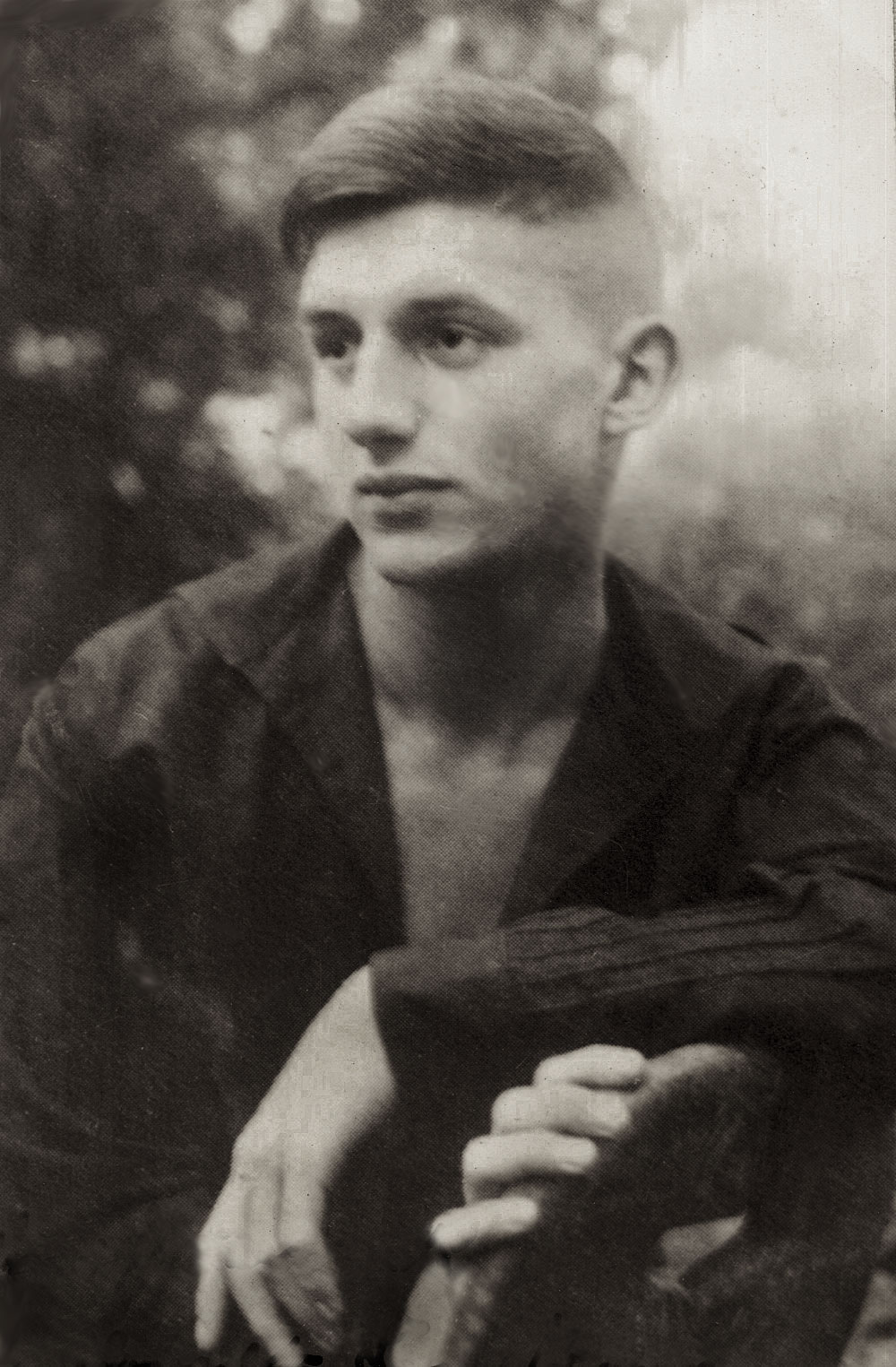
- Becker c. 1930
- Born: 14 November 1906; Thale, German Empire
- Died: 22 April 2002 (aged 95); Hamburg, Germany
- Occupation: Actor

Albrecht Becker (14 November 1906 – 22 April 2002) was a German production designer, photographer, and actor who was imprisoned by the Nazi regime for the charge of homosexuality.

== Personal life ==
Born in Thale, Germany, Becker trained as a teacher. At age eighteen, he began a relationship with the Director of the State Archive in Würzburg, Joseph Friedrich Abert, an older man. The relationship lasted ten years. Through this contact, he met an array of influential and artistic people. He was an actor and production designer.

Later in life, he devoted himself completely to photography. While living in Freiburg and Vienna, he showed his first exhibitions and earned his first commissions. He supplemented his income by providing photographs for newspapers and magazines.

== Würzburg ==
Würzburg is a city in the southern state of Bavaria. Living in Würzburg in the 1930s was a Jewish wine merchant named Dr Leopold Obermayer, who apparently complained to the local police department that his mail was being opened. The complaint was investigated by the Gestapo, who took the liberty to search Obermayer's home and discovered a number of photographs of young men in his safe. One of these photographs was of Albrecht Becker. Becker was brought in for questioning in 1935 on suspicion of violating Paragraph 175.

Becker reportedly declared: "Everybody knows I'm a homosexual." Both Obermayer and Becker were put on trial. Becker was sentenced to three years in prison at Nürnberg. Obermayer was also convicted of violating Paragraph 175, but as a Jew was sent to Dachau concentration camp. He was tortured there and sent to Mauthausen-Gusen concentration camp, where he died.

Towards the end of the war, as the need to replace losses increased, Becker was released in order to serve in the Wehrmacht. He served on the Russian front until 1944. Becker spoke of his experiences during the war in the 2000 documentary Paragraph 175.

== Last years ==
During the 1970s, Becker's photography encompassed an eclectic range of subjects including ushers at the Vienna Opera, monks in an Augustinian monastery, Berlin gravediggers, and the ruins of Küstrin. At the center of his work was the human body. He would photograph it either as a whole or part.

== Death ==
Becker died of natural causes in Hamburg, Germany in 2002, aged 95.

== Selected filmography ==
- Not Afraid of Big Animals (1953)
- The Flower of Hawaii (1953)
- Columbus Discovers Kraehwinkel (1954)
- The False Adam (1955)
- Ball at the Savoy (1955)
- Bandits of the Autobahn (1955)
- Operation Sleeping Bag (1955)
- Music in the Blood (1955)
- A Heart Returns Home (1956)
- Heart Without Mercy (1958)
- Pension Schöller (1960)
- Beloved Impostor (1961)
- Pichler's Books Are Not in Order (1961)
- The Constant Wife (1962)

== See also ==
- Persecution of homosexuals in Nazi Germany and the Holocaust
