= Karl Gorath =

German gay man imprisoned during the Holocaust

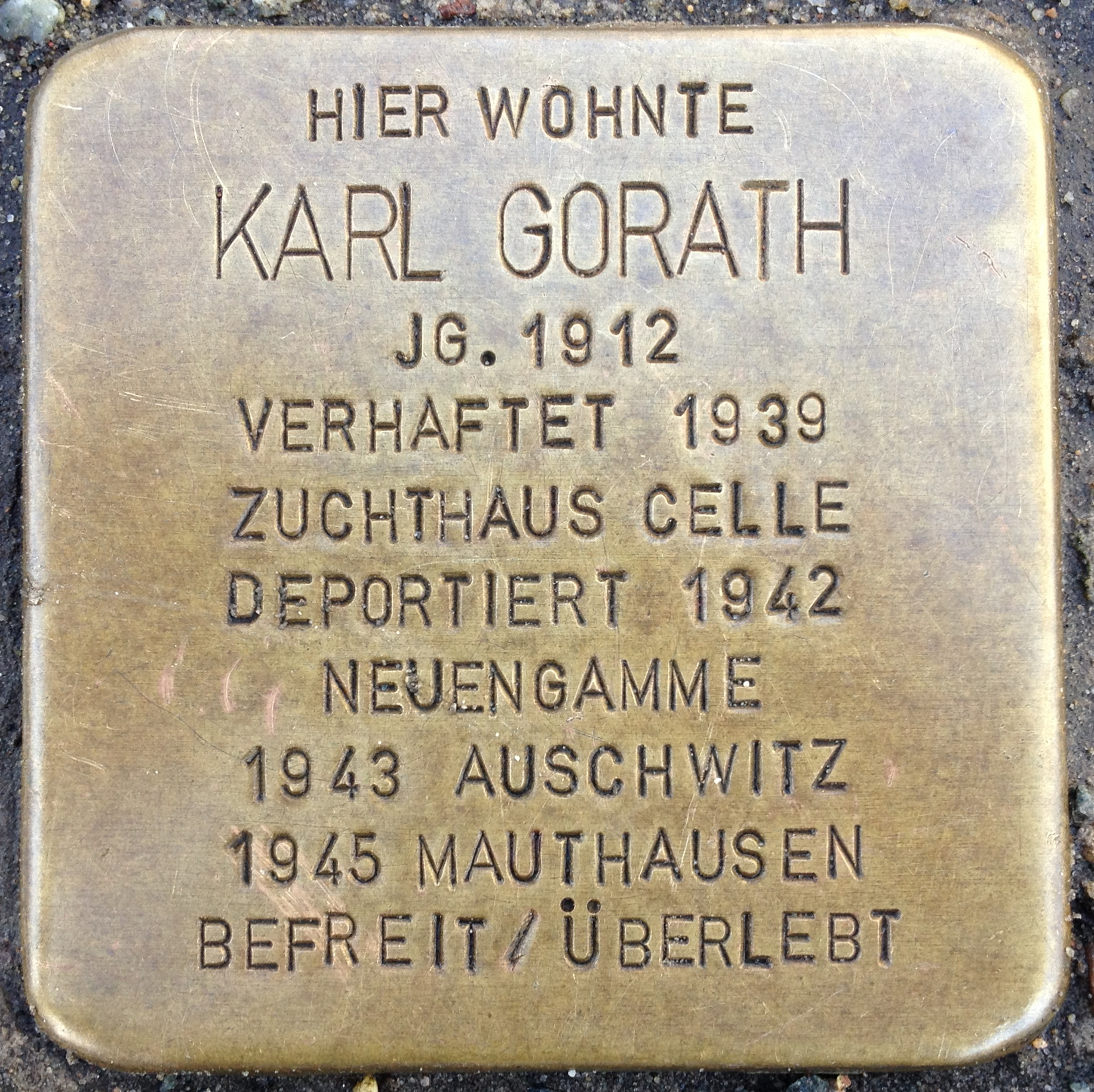
- A Stolperstein to Gorath in Bremerhaven
- Born: 12 December 1912; Bad Zwischenahn, Grand Duchy of Oldenburg, German Empire
- Died: 18 March 2003 (aged 90); Bremerhaven, Bremen, Germany
- Occupation: Nurse
- Status: Freed by the Red Army in 1945
- Conviction: Homosexuality
- Penalty: Imprisoned at Neuengamme and Auschwitz

Karl Gorath (12 December 1912, Bad Zwischenahn − 18 March 2003, Bremerhaven) was a gay man who was arrested in 1938 and imprisoned for homosexuality at Neuengamme and Auschwitz. He was freed in 1945 by the Red Army, and later imprisoned by the same Nazi judge in Occupied West Germany.

Gorath was training for a nursing career when, at 26, he was denounced as a homosexual by his "jealous lover" and arrested under Paragraph 175 of the criminal code, which defined homosexuality as an "unnatural act".

Gorath was imprisoned at Neuengamme near Hamburg, Germany, and was forced to wear a pink triangle, identifying him as gay and a transvestite.

Because of his medical training, Gorath was transferred to work at a prisoner hospital in a sub-camp of Neuengamme. When he refused to decrease the bread ration for patients who were Poles, Gorath was transferred to Auschwitz. There he wore the red triangle of a political prisoner, which he believed spared him the brutality inflicted on inmates identified as gay. In January 1945, Gorath was freed when the Red Army liberated Auschwitz.

After the war, in 1947 he was sentenced again: “By the same Judge. Rabien his name was. He received me in the courtroom with the words: ‘You are here again!’”

Gorath is one of six gay men who are the subject of a documentary on gay men in Nazi concentration camps. The film, by producers Jeffrey Friedman and Rob Epstein and narrated by Rupert Everett, is called Paragraph 175.

== See also ==
- Persecution of homosexuals in Nazi Germany and the Holocaust
