= LGBTQ history in Illinois =

The U.S. state of Illinois has an active LGBT history, centered on its largest city Chicago, where by the 1920s a gay village had emerged in the Old Town district. Chicago was also the base for the short-lived Society for Human Rights, an early LGBT rights advocacy organization (1924). In 1961 Illinois became the first U.S. state to decriminalize certain forms of homosexual activity. Gay and lesbian culture developed in Chicago thereafter, and the 2006 Gay Games were held in the city. Civil unions have been recognized in Illinois since 2014.

== 19th century ==
In 1827, Illinois became the first state to criminalize the act of fellatio, ruling it as an act of sodomy. In the same year, a law was passed that prohibited people convicted of sodomy from voting or serving on a jury; this was the first American state to restrict civil rights of people convicted of sodomy. In 1862, the transgender man Albert Cashier enlisted in the 95th Illinois Infantry Regiment. Cashier fought in numerous battles and survived the war, and enjoyed many privileges which were restricted from women for the next several decades until the near end of his life. He was buried with full military honors under his adopted name.

== 20th century ==
=== 1900–1949 ===
By 1920, the Old Town district had become Chicago's first gay village. On December 10, 1924, the state issued a charter to a nonprofit corporation called the Society for Human Rights, established in Old Town. It became the first openly homophile advocacy group in the United States, and had, through its founder and World War I army veteran Henry Gerber, taken its inspiration from the writings of German activist and physician Magnus Hirschfeld. It was effectively dissolved within a few months of its establishment after the small group of members are arrested on obscenity charges. It became an indirect inspiration for then-Los Angeles resident Harry Hay, who heard of the group from a partner of one of the Society's members and would later establish in 1950 the first enduring homophile organization, the Mattachine Society.

=== 1950–1968 ===
In 1961, Illinois decriminalized consensual sodomy, the first state to do so. This was in accordance with the American Law Institute's Model Penal Code, which abrogated the criminalization of adult, consensual, private, sexual conduct. However, "lewd fondling or caress" between persons of the same sex in public space remained illegal until 1984. In 1965, Mattachine Midwest, the Chicago chapter of the Mattachine Society, was established. Prior chapters of the Society had been disbanded previously in the 1950s and 1960s. Among the members of the chapter are Pearl M. Hart and Valerie Taylor. The Society operated a 24-hour hotline and helped arrange legal aid from the ACLU for people detained in police raids.

=== 1969–1999 ===
The first gay bar in Springfield, Smokey's Den, opened in 1966. In 1969, Baton Show Lounge was founded in River North. In 1970, the Bijou Theater was opened in Chicago's Old Town neighborhood, and Chicago Pride Parade was first held. The University of Chicago-based Chicago Gay Liberation organized protests against laws forbidding same-sex dancing and an anti-war march. In 1973, Gay Horizons opened up as Chicago's first LGBT community center, changing its name to Horizons Community Services in 1985. In July 1973, alderman Clifford P. Kelley proposed the Human Rights Ordinance in Chicago to fight discrimination in housing based on sexual orientation.

Jane Byrne was the first Chicago mayor to officially recognize the LGBT community. Harold Washington started Chicago's first Committee on Gay and Lesbian Issues. Eugene Sawyer pushed the Chicago City Council to pass the Human Rights Ordinance in December 1988, with a vote of 28–17. Evanston and Oak Park also passed anti-discrimination laws. In 1976, Gay Chicago Magazine was founded in by Ralph Paul Gernhardt. A resource center and support hotline opened at the University of Illinois Urbana-Champaign. Urbana was the first city in Illinois to pass a gay rights ordinance in 1977. In 1981, the Gerber/Hart Library was opened. This was also the first year the Chicago Pride Parade was officially recognized by the mayor's office. LGBT newspaper Windy City Times published its first issue on September 26, 1985, in Chicago. In 1989, Richard M. Daley participated in the Gay Pride Parade, the first Chicago mayor to do so. In 1991, the Chicago Gay and Lesbian Hall of Fame was established. In 1993, Cook County passed a law that forbade discrimination based on sexual orientation. In 1997, Larry McKeon became the first openly gay member of the Illinois State Legislature. In July 1997, Evanston became the first city in Illinois to add transgender to the protected categories covered by anti-discrimination laws.

== 21st century ==
=== 2000s ===
In 2003, Horizons Community Center renamed itself as the Center on Halsted. In 2007, it moved into its permanent location at the corner of Halsted and Waveland in Boystown, Chicago. On January 1, 2006, the Illinois Human Rights Act was amended to protected LGBT persons from unfair discrimination. In 2006, the 2006 Gay Games were held in Chicago from July 15–July 22.

=== 2010s ===
On June 1, 2011, the Illinois Religious Freedom Protection and Civil Union Act took effect, which permitted civil unions between same-sex couples. Governor Pat Quinn signed legislation introducing civil unions to Illinois. The Illinois House of Representatives passed the Illinois Religious Freedom and Marriage Fairness Act on November 5, 2013, which legalized same-sex marriages and allowed the conversion of civil unions to marriages. It took effect on June 1, 2014. On August 20, 2015, Governor Bruce Rauner signed the Youth Mental Health Protection Act, prohibiting conversion therapy for minors. In 2019, Governor J. B. Pritzker signed a law mandatory an LGBT history curriculum be taught in Illinois schools. In June 2019, the Midwest's first drag-centered festival, Chicago Is a Drag Festival, was founded.

=== 2020s ===
In June 2021, a groundbreaking ceremony was held for the AIDS Garden Chicago; the park officially opened on June 2, 2022.

== See also ==
- LGBT rights in Illinois
