= Berlin (nightclub) =

Defunct LGBTQ nightclub

Coordinates: 41°56′24″N 87°39′13″W

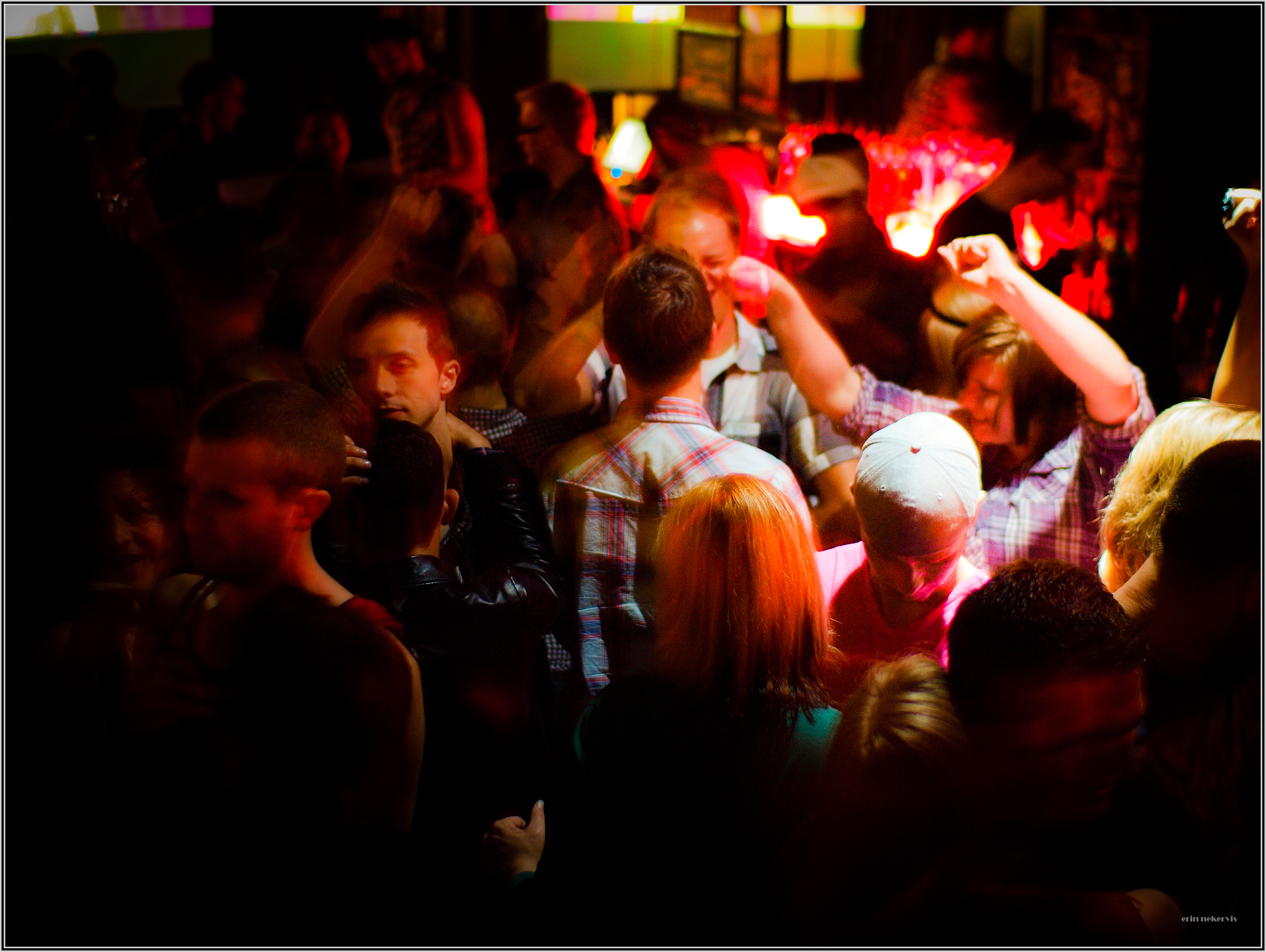
In the dance floor

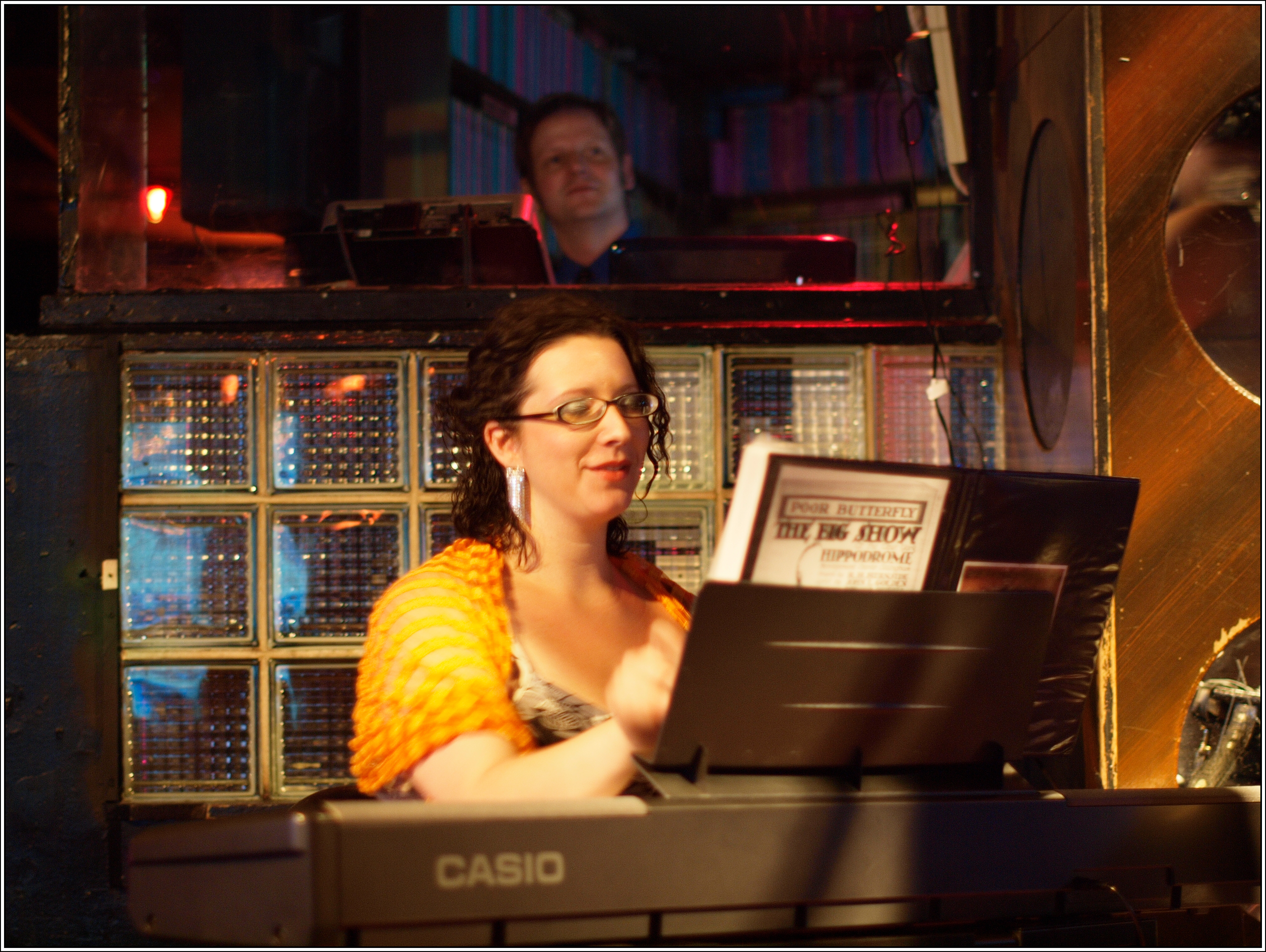
Playing music at the club

Berlin was a nightclub located at 954 W. Belmont Ave. in Chicago's Lake View neighborhood. Originally advertised as "the Neighborhood Bar of the Future", Berlin was frequented by a variety of demographics, but was primarily an LGBTQ nightclub. Berlin is considered culturally and historically significant by Chicago's LGBTQ community.

== History ==
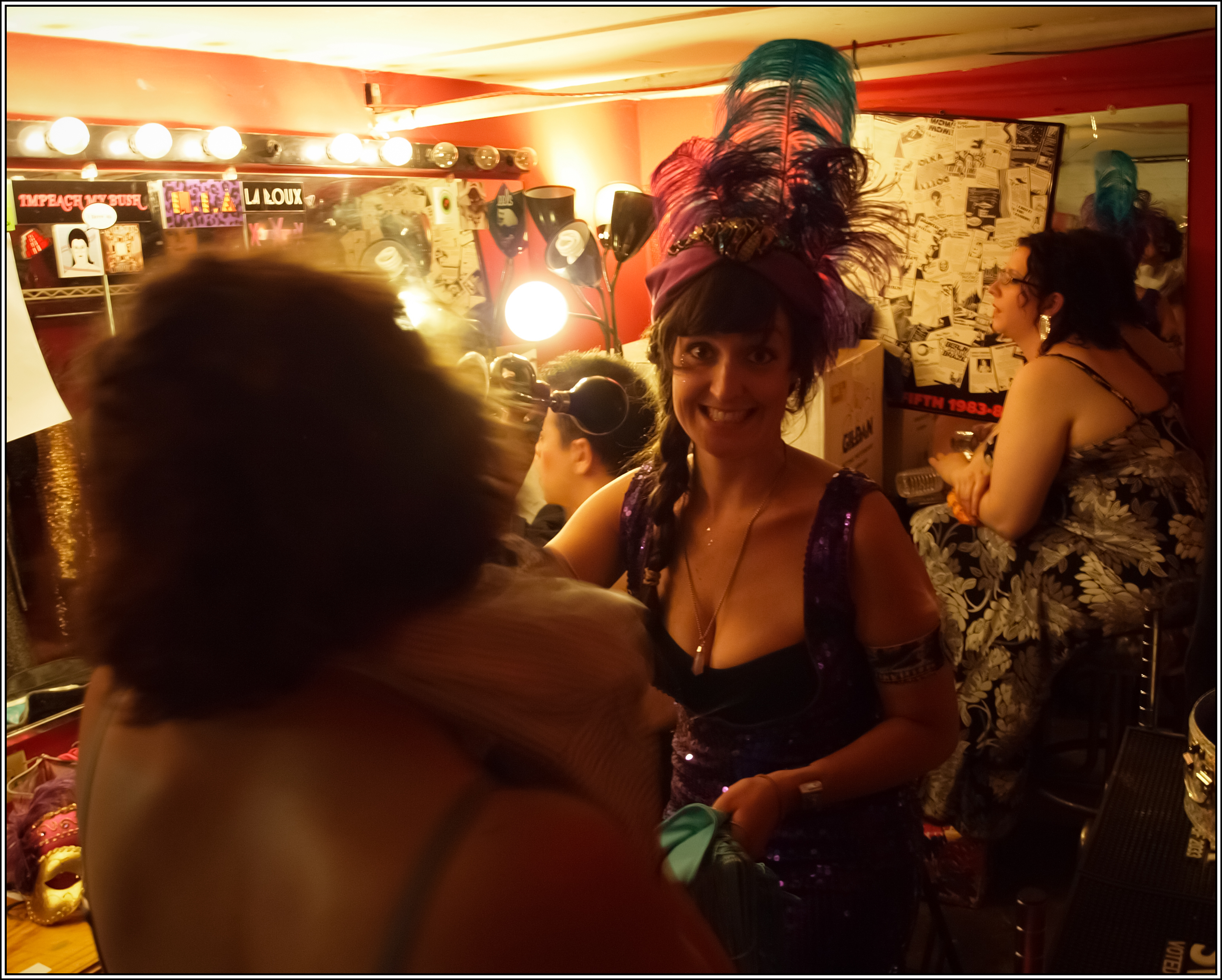
inside the dressing room

Berlin opened on November 4th, 1983 by co-owners Shirley Mooney and Tim Sullivan. Following Sullivan's death in 1994, Mooney stepped away from managing the club, and ownership was transferred to Jim Schuman and Jo Webster.

Throughout its run, Berlin was well-known for its events, which included dance parties, fundraisers, and art installations. The nightclub attracted a variety of communities and subcultures, particularly Chicago's drag performers and industrial music scene.

Berlin closed permanently on November 19, 2023, following months of union negotiations and a staff-organized boycott of Berlin. Berlin's staff unionized in the spring of 2023. In August 2023, the staff went on a two-day strike, citing union demands for a livable wage, healthcare benefits, and improvement of working conditions. They continued to hold scheduled boycotts in the following months until Schuman and Webster announced Berlin's closing. Schuman and Webster named rising costs as well as Schuman's cancer diagnosis as reasons for closing the club.
