= Minbar (disambiguation) =

The minbar is the location within a mosque where the imam stands.

Minbar may also refer to:

- Minbar (planet), the home planet of the Minbari, a fictional species within the Babylon 5 universe

== See also ==
- Al Menbar (disambiguation)
- Golden Minbar International Film Festival
- Minibar (disambiguation)
