= LGBTQ culture in Chicago =

The LGBTQ community in Chicago is one of the United States' most prominent, especially within the Midwest, alongside those of San Francisco and New York City, and holds a significant role in the progression of gay rights in the country. With a population of around 3 million, Chicago is the third biggest city in the US, and around 150,000 of those people identify as lesbian, bisexual, gay, transgender, questioning, or another LGBTQ+ identity.

Gay neighborhoods in Chicago have existed since the 1920s, when there was homosexual nightlife in Towertown, adjacent to the Water Tower. Increasing rents during the middle of the 20th century forced gay-friendly establishments steadily northwards, moving through Old Town and Lincoln Park along Clark Street and on to Boystown.

Boystown presently serves as the best-known Chicago gayborhood and as a center of its LGBTQ culture. In recent years, the area has been criticized for focusing on "affluent white gay men," rather than the broader LGBTQ community. Gentrification has pushed many LGBTQ people to reside ever further north into Uptown, Edgewater and Rogers Park.

== History ==
Skyline of Chicago

=== 19th century ===
In 1889, social reformer and activist Jane Addams opened Chicago's first settlement house, the Chicago Hull House. The purpose of it was to offer social reform for the community during the Gilded Age when many immigrants required help. Jane Addams had at least two same sex relationships over a long period of time. One of them was with Mary Rozet Smith, a Chicago born philanthropist.

=== 20th century ===
During the 1920s and 1930s, Chicago, like other major urban centers, experienced what was called the Pansy Craze, when LBGTQ visibility greatly opened up. Gay cabarets were established and nightclubs had a steady demand. By the 1930s there were at least 35 pansy parlors. These clubs were so busy that some of them, like "Diamond Lil's" had to turn people away.

In 1924, the first American gay rights organization, the Society for Human Rights, was established by German immigrant and Chicago resident Henry Gerber. Gerber was inspired by similar institutions back in Germany and wanted to recreate one in Chicago. Its purpose was to defend the rights of people who have disabilities or were abused. On December 10, 1924, the state of Illinois officially recognized the society. Although it was shut down not long after, it made an impact, as gays and lesbians were seen to be more open near the Magnificent Mile area.

In the second half of the 20th century, more gay communities were established, centered around Clark Street. These neighborhoods would later develop into Boystown (Northalsted) and Andersonville. On July 28, 1961, Illinois became the first state to abolish sodomy laws as part of a package to revise old criminal laws. Along with this rise in LGBT population came increasingly frequent police raids which led to arrests for actions such as cross dressing. Groups like the Mattachine Society attempted to meet with the police and negotiate the arrests, but to no avail.

In 1969, the Baton Show Lounge was founded in River North. In 1970, the Bijou Theater was opened in Chicago's Old Town neighborhood.

In 1970, Chicago held its first pride parade in honor of the three-day long Stonewall riots. Mostly acting as a political march, only 150 were in attendance. Since then, it has become a powerful symbol and annual celebration.

In April 1983, Harold Washington was elected the mayor of Chicago, and greatly supported LGBT rights, addressing gay rallies and pushing forward pro-LGBT legislation. His Human Rights Ordinance passed in 1988, after his death.

During the 1980s, the AIDS epidemic was at its peak in the United States, including in Chicago. On September 9, 1985, the Chicago House was incorporated into Illinois as a project to house those suffering from the disease. A few years later, Chicago honored the victims of AIDS through "The Names Project AIDS Memorial Quilt", which can be found in Navy Pier. In June 2021, a groundbreaking ceremony was held for the AIDS Garden Chicago; the park officially opened on June 2, 2022.

LGBT newspaper Windy City Times published its first issue on September 26, 1985, in Chicago. The Chicago Gay and Lesbian Hall of Fame was established in 1991.

In 1993, a community that is present to this day called the Center on Halsted opened. Located in Lakeview, it provides many programs and services for the LGBTQ community. The Center on Halsted has now also transformed more broadly into a recreational space.

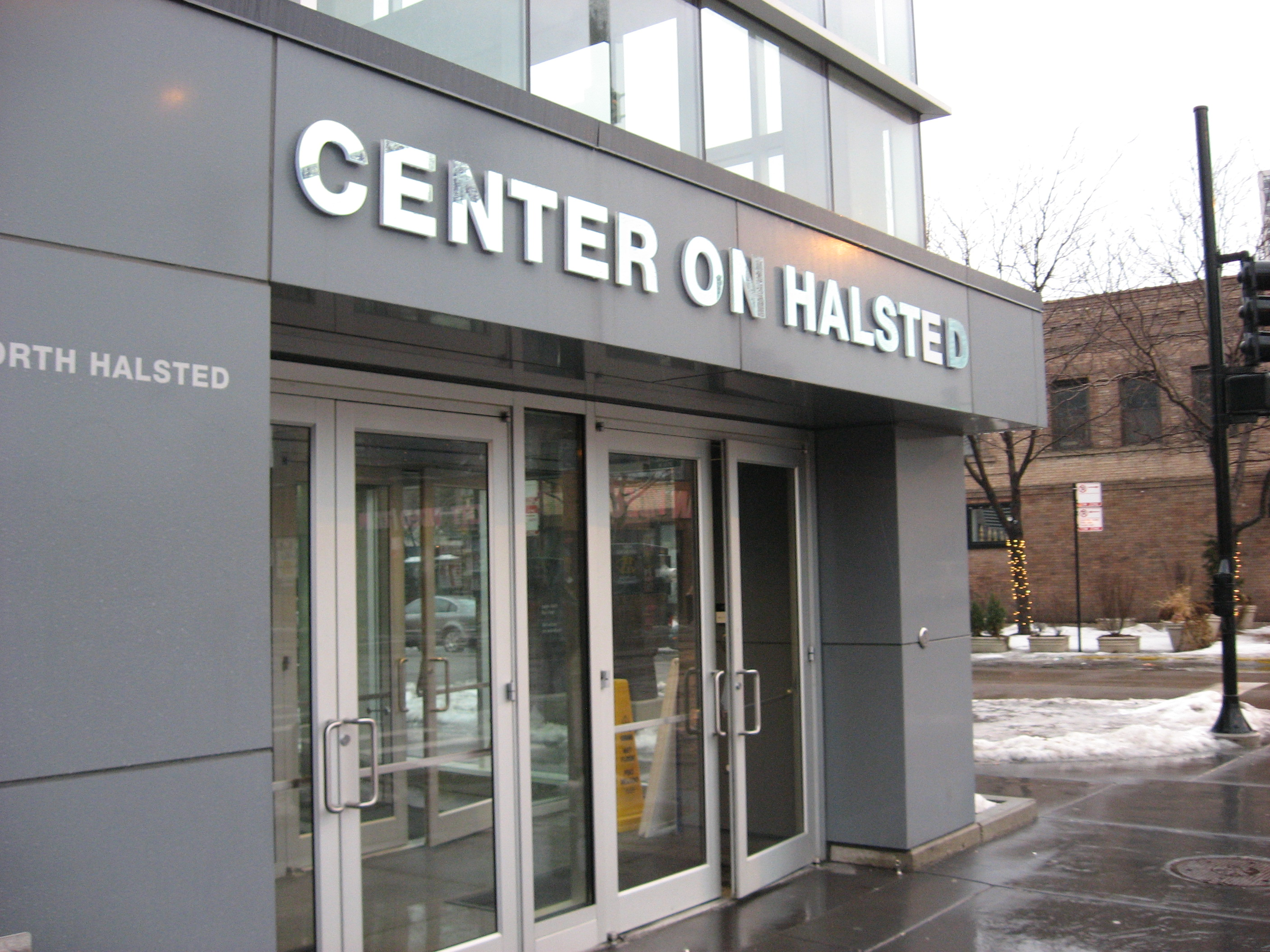
Center on Halsted

=== 21st century ===
In 2004 Illinois fully banned discrimination based on sexual orientation through the Illinois Human Rights Act. In 2007, the Center on Halsted opened its doors on Halsted Street and Waveland Avenue, bringing in over one thousand people per day.

The 2006 Gay Games were held in Chicago from July 15–22, 2006.

Illinois in the 21st century passed a flurry of acts to further protect LGBT rights. In 2010, the Safe School Improvement Act was passed, prohibiting bullying or violence on the basis of discrimination, including for sexual and gender identity. In 2013, Illinois Governor Pat Quinn signed off on the Religious Freedom and Marriage Fairness Act. In doing this, Illinois became the 16th state to fully allow same-sex marriage. The first couple to do so were Vernita Gray, and her partner, Patricia Ewert, marrying on November 27, 2013.

Recently, in 2019, Lori Lightfoot became at age 56 the first black woman and gay mayor of Chicago. She was inaugurated on May 20, 2019.

In June 2019, the Midwest's first drag-centered festival, Chicago Is a Drag Festival, was founded.

== LGBT neighborhoods of Chicago ==
Notable LGBT-friendly neighborhoods in Chicago include Boystown, Andersonville, Uptown, and Edgewater.

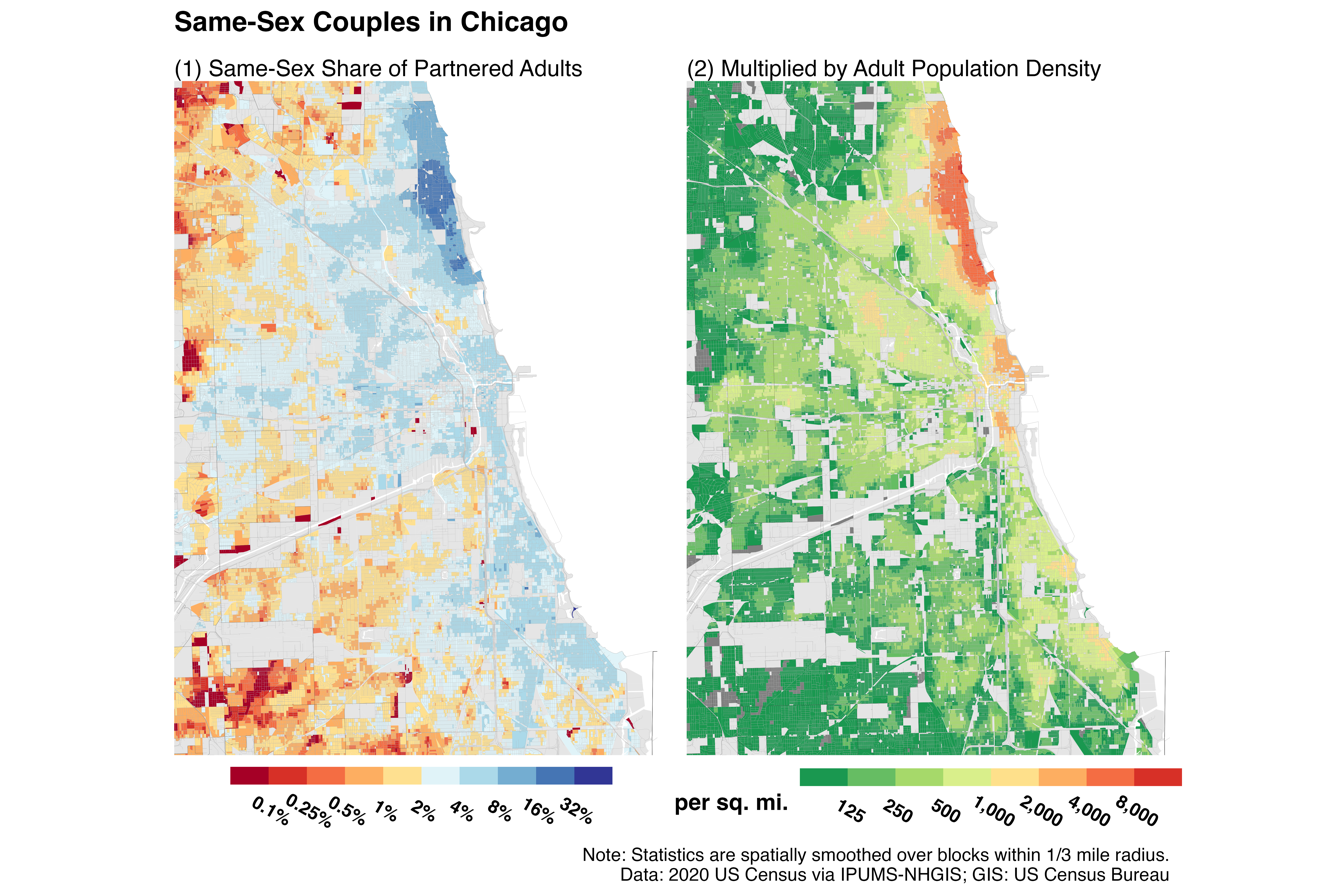
Map of same-sex couples in Chicago

=== Boystown ===
Northalsted, commonly known as Boystown, hosts one of the largest LGBT populations in the United States, and has hosted the annual pride parade since 1971. Originally the parade was started in 1970 as a march from Washington Square Park to the water tower, but since then it has taken different routes. The parade now passes through other neighborhoods along the way.

Boystown is home to the Legacy Walk, which honors famous LGBT individuals by placing their portraits and biographies on bronze plaques placed throughout the neighborhood. It is the world's only outdoor LGBT history museum.

== Politics ==
In 1961, Illinois became the first state to repeal its sodomy law. Effective LGBT political involvement began in the 1960s alongside the civil rights movement, with organizations such as the Chicago Gay Liberation Network, Mattachine Midwest, and ACT UP/Chicago.

In 1965, Mattachine Midwest was founded as a gay rights organization following the Fun Lounge police raid the previous year. This organization was the first enduring gay rights organization, for it lasted until 1986. The Mattachine Midwest contributed both politically and socially to help the discrimination against LGBT groups, raising awareness about bar raids and police entrapment. The organization also created a monthly newsletter that provided LGBT groups in Chicago sources of gay community news, and provided a phone number for the LGBT community to find legal, medical, counseling, employment or religious help if needed. These contributions resulted in Mattachine Midwest being added to the Chicago LGBT Hall of Fame.

Political LGBT interest groups such as the Chicago Gay and Lesbian Democrats have been prominent in the city since the 1980s.

Throughout the 1960s, 1970s, and 1980s, Chuck Renslow was one of the main pioneers for Chicago's LGBT community through his advocacy for inclusion, and fought alongside the Democratic party to push for non-discrimination protections. He had served eight years as a Democratic precinct captain and was a delegate to the 1980 Democratic National Convention. Renslow was also widely known for his long-running leather bar, which was also one of the first opened in Chicago, and his world-renowned provocative male photography that earned him a spot in the Chicago LGBT Hall Of Fame.

In 1983, mayoral candidate Jane Byrne promised to support the LGBT community, and garnered the endorsement of the Chicago Gay and Lesbian Democrats. Harold Washington prevailed over Byrne in the Democratic Party primary, and subsequently received the support of LGBT voters, helping him to win the general election and become the first African American mayor of Chicago. Harold Washington's support for gay rights earned him a spot in the Chicago LGBT Hall of Fame.

ACT UP/Chicago was an organization dedicated to improving the lives of people with AIDS. It often criticized the Mayor of Chicago Richard M. Daley. It later became a part of the Chicago LGBT Hall of Fame for actively challenging the institutional response to AIDS and the discrimination against LGBT groups.

Originally called the Chicago Anti-Bashing Network in 1988 and later changed to the Gay Liberation Network (GLN) in 2004, the GLN was formed by activist Andy Thayer after the murder of Matthew Shepard. The GLN were active in protests against discrimination, including by the Chicago Police Department. Their activism contributed greatly to the passing of SB10 in the state in November 2013, which legalized the same-sex marriage.

In 2019, Lori. E Lightfoot was elected the 56th mayor of Chicago, becoming the first Black woman and openly gay person to serve in the position. Lightfoot had previously served as the President of the Chicago Police Board, chairing the Police Accountability Task Force, and worked as a senior equity partner in the Litigation and Conflict Resolution Group at Mayer Brown. In office, she introduced a resolution acknowledging and promoting LGBT businesses.

Over time, the LGBT community has become more involved in city politics. In 2023, there were nine openly LGBT council members, the largest number of any city council in the country.

== Notable people ==
Many individuals have lived in or around the City of Chicago as well as affecting or identifying in the queer community have impacted the city.

Notable drag performers from Chicago include:

- Shea Couleé
- Denali
- DiDa Ritz
- Gia Gunn
- Kahmora Hall
- Monica Beverly Hillz
- Kim Chi
- Laila McQueen
- Naysha Lopez
- Phi Phi O'Hara
- Sigourney Beaver
- Silky Nutmeg Ganache
- Naomi Smalls
- Soju
- The Princess
- The Vixen

=== Jane Addams ===
Jane Addams was an LGBT activist prominent in the early 1900s. Born September 6, 1860, in Cedarville, Illinois, she was a co-founder of the Hull House, one of the first social foundations in North America. The settlement included 13 buildings and a playground. Addams spent her time after her father's death in 1881 tending to this settlement, which supported the community, offering jobs and college-level courses. The house eventually took to tending to immigrants and those who couldn't afford housing.

She would later successfully advance tenement housing regulations, an eight-hour factory work day, and better workplace inspections and oversight, and became a co-winner of the Nobel Peace Prize in 1931.

Jane Addams was inducted into the Chicago Gay and Lesbian Hall of Fame in 2008. While she and her life partner Mary Rozet Smith spent 35 years romantically together, according to the Hull House Museum, Addams was better described under the broad term "queer", rather than "gay" or "lesbian".

=== Howard Brown Health ===
The Howard Brown Health Center is a non-profit LGBT healthcare and social services provider, founded in 1974 by Chicago-based organizers and researchers and named after Dr. Howard Junior Brown. Howard Brown Health describes itself as one of the first gay-focused health centers in the nation.

As the AIDS crisis struck in the early 1980s, the center supported the city's response, implementing the City of Chicago's AIDS Hotline in 1975. The hotline was operated 24 hours a day by staff and volunteers.

In 1991, Howard Brown was inducted into the Chicago LGBT Hall of Fame. Their Capital Campaign resulted in the construction of a new $3.5 million facility to expand their services.

Through the late 1980s, Howard Brown also continued to operate The Brown Elephant, a prominent resale clothing store that financially supported Howard Brown Health. Brown Elephant directly funds services for more than 50% of uninsured or under-insured patients at the center. The Brown Elephant was named the best resale in the city by the Chicago Reader in 2010.

=== Dom Orejudos ===
Dom Orejudos, known on stage as "Etienne", was a ballet dancer, choreographer, and artist. After attending the Ellis-DuBulay School of Ballet, Orejudos joined the Illinois Ballet Company. A Chicago Tribune critic in 1959 described him as "a performer of elasticity and charm" and told him that his dancing had an unmistakable personality to it. His ballet, The Charioteer later received major recognition for inaugurating the first color telecast of WTTW in Chicago. Their station received three Emmys awards for the production and presentation.

Orejudos's fantasy art has been displayed on posters and magazines for decades due to his unique approach to translating sexuality onto paper. His most famous collection, known for its use of leather clothing, details the male body as it enhances their appearance for a factor of intrigue. He and his business partner and long-time companion Chuck Renslow carried on to operate several businesses including International Mr. Leather and the Gold Coast Bar.

After a long battle with AIDS, Orejudos died at home in Boulder, Colorado in 1991 at the age of 58. His work thereafter continued to be prominent in gay culture.

=== Danny Sotomayor ===
Daniel Sotomayor, a resident of Chicago of Mexican and Puerto Rican descent, was born in 1958. He graduated from the American Academy of Art with a major in graphic design as he dove into his passion for cartooning, but his life stopped short as he was diagnosed with AIDS in 1988, redirecting Sotomayor's journey as an artist.

As his life was foreshortened, Sotomayor became heavily involved with Chicago activists and portrayed himself as an essential figure in the ACTUP/Chicago movement. Sotomayor became recognized as the first openly gay, openly HIV-positive cartoon artist in the nation, creating pieces on the topic of modern medicine, public policy, law enforcement, family dynamics, popular culture, and the gay community more broadly.

Sotomayor was widely known for his public confrontations with Mayor Richard M. Daley of Chicago while he made headlines in 1990 for his banner stating "We demand equal healthcare now", and "Daily tell the truth about AIDS". Sotomayor attempted to implement the city's AIDS plan, by bringing attention to inadequate education, prevention, and media plans according to the LGBT Hall of Fame.

On February 2, 1992, he received an "Alongi Award" in recognition of his efforts as an activist during the AIDS crisis as an HIV patient himself. He died 3 days later on February 5, 1992.

=== Marie J. Kuda ===
Marie J. Kuda was a historian, archivist, writer, lecturer, and promoter of LGBTQ+ history, who worked to spread and preserve a positive image of the LGBTQ+ community. She organized lesbian writing conferences and published the first lesbian annotated bibliography. She was inducted into the Chicago LGBT Hall of Fame in 1991, and died in 2016 at the age of 76.

=== Charlene Carruthers ===
Charlene Carruthers is an LGBT activist, community organizer, and author based in Chicago, Illinois. She gained notability through her commitment to racial and social justice issues, such as police brutality, and was involved in grassroots activism advocating for the rights of people in marginalized communities. She worked as the national director of the Black Youth Project 100, a youth-led organization that mobilizes and empowers young black activists.

== Institutions ==
=== AD HOC Committee of Proud Black Lesbians and Gays ===
The AD HOC Committee of Proud Black Lesbians and Gays organization was formed in 1993 with the purpose of participating in the Bud Billiken parade. The event is hosted by the Chicago Defender Charities, and is considered the largest African-American parade in the nation. The committee was denied participation after completing the necessary steps to enter well before the deadline. The group filed a complaint on the basis of sexual discrimination, and eventually were allowed to participate in the parade.

=== Other institutions ===
- Center on Halsted, LGBT community center
- Windy City Black Pride, LGBT-related assistance and events serving African-American communities
- National Gay and Lesbian Sports Hall of Fame
- Leather Archives and Museum, collects and exhibits artifacts related to LGBT leather subculture
- Gerber/Hart Library, largest circulating library of gay and lesbian titles in the Midwestern United States

== Media ==
The now-defunct Chicago Gay Crusader and the Windy City Times have served LGBT readers, while Windy City Radio is the city's only LGBT radio station.

== Recreation ==
=== Events ===
- Artemis Singers
- Chicago Gay Men's Chorus, founded in 1983
- Chicago Is a Drag Festival, founded in 2019
- Chicago Pride Parade, the annual gay pride parade in June; over a million people now participate in the pride festivities
- International Mr. Leather
- Northalsted Market Days
- Reeling: The Chicago LGBTQ International Film Festival, founded in 1981

=== Places ===
==== Current ====
- Baton Show Lounge
- Big Chicks
- Bijou Theater
- Gold Coast (bar), gay leather bar founded in 1958
- Leather Archives & Museum
- Marty's Martini Bar
- Pride Arts Center
- Sidetrack (Chicago)
- Warehouse (nightclub)
- Women & Children First (bookstore)

==== Defunct ====
- Man's Country, longest-running gay bathhouse
- Minibar (Chicago)

== See also ==
- Boystown, section of Lakeview was the first officially recognized gay village in the United States
- Chicago LGBT Hall of Fame
- Legacy Walk, an outdoor public display in Chicago which celebrates LGBT contributions
- Society for Human Rights, Chicago-based LGBT human rights organization
