= Minibar (disambiguation) =

A minibar is a small fridge commonly found in hotel rooms.

Minibar may also refer to:

- miniBar, a cocktail bar in Boston's Copley Square Hotel
- Minibar, British band which backed Pete Yorn
- minibar by José Andrés, Washington D.C., one of the José Andrés restaurants
- Minibar (Chicago), gay bar that operated from 2005 to 2016
- "Minibar", a song by Gracie Abrams from her 2026 album Daughter from Hell

== See also ==
- Minbar (disambiguation)
