= Marty's Martini Bar =

Cocktail bar in Chicago, Illinois, U.S.

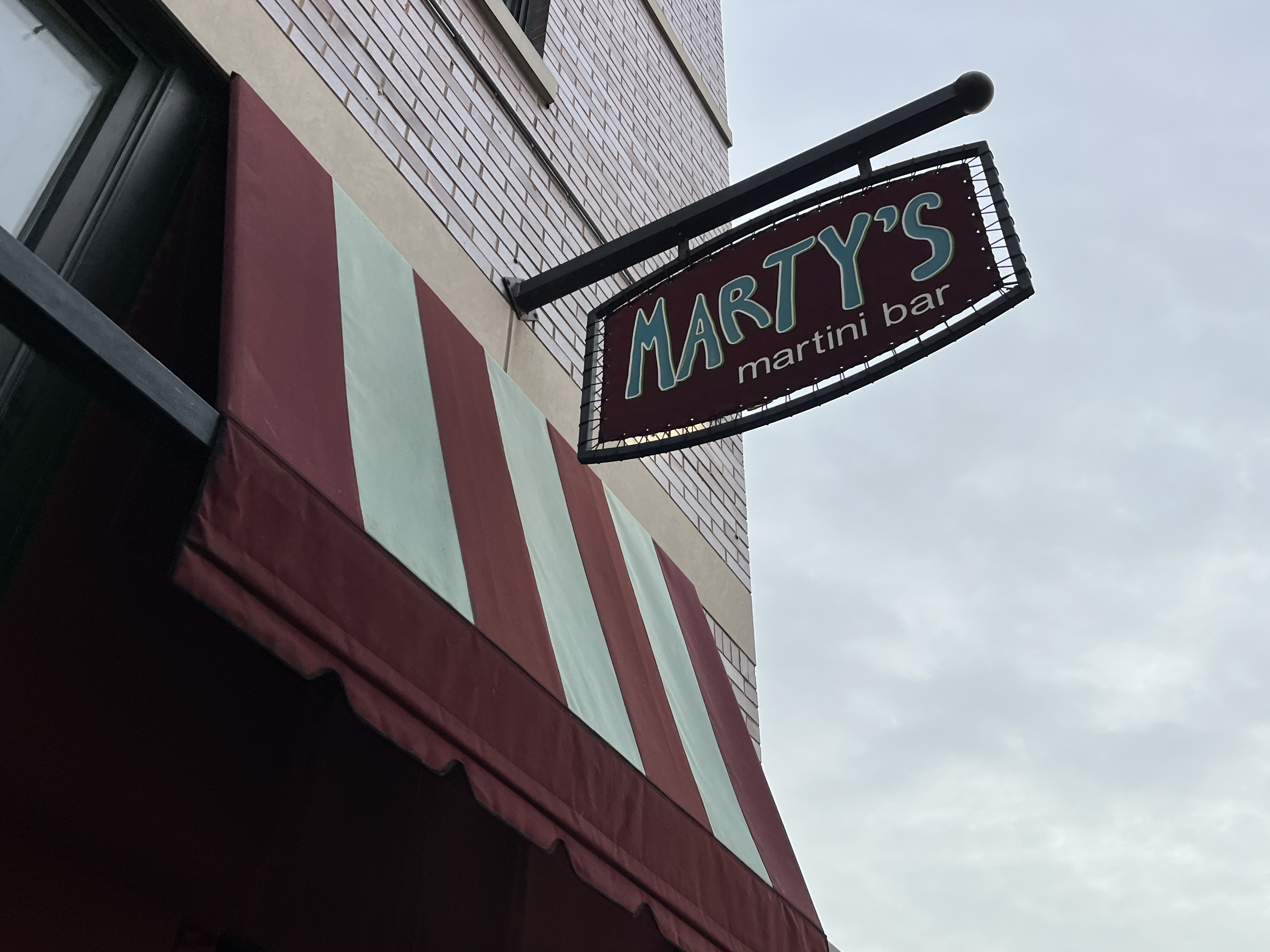
- Interactive map of Marty's Martini Bar

Restaurant information
- Established: 2006
- Location: 1477 W Winnemac Ave, Chicago, Illinois, 60640, United States

Marty's Martini Bar is a cocktail bar in Andersonville, Chicago, that opened in 2006.

== Description ==
Marty's Martini Bar is a small, upscale, "Toulouse-Lautrec-styled" cocktail bar in Andersonville, Chicago. The interior features gilt-framed mirrors and posters. The Not for Tourists Guide to Chicago has described the bar as "compact and classy". The guide has also called Marty's a gay bar. Moon Chicago says Marty's "becomes a gay bar late at night". In 2016, Time Out Chicago said of the clientele: "it seems the straight folk tend to show up first for a predinner cocktail and the gay crowd comes later. Like gentrification, but in reverse."

The Chicago Tribune has said the "cozy" bar serves "classic" cocktails. Drinks come to two sizes. The menu has included the Black Velvet, Cosmopolitans, the Crème brûlée, the Dirty Bird (olive juice and blue cheese-stuffed olives), and the Pineapple Upside-Down martini.

The bar relocated from Balmoral Avenue to Winnemac Avenue in 2024, following its sale to 2Bears Tavern Group.

== Reception ==
Fodor's has said the bar serves "some of the tastiest cocktails in town". Marty's was included in Eater Chicago's 2014 list of the city's ten "most overlooked" cocktail bars. In 2022, Shone Palmer of San Diego Gay and Lesbian News included Marty's in an overview of Chicago's best gay bars, writing: "Marty's Martini Bar is the best place to go if a night in with candles, a glass of wine, and sade playing on vinyl seems like your idea of a good time. You won't find a more spectacular or fantastic homosexual bar in all of Chicago than this one. The club successfully combines coziness, luxury, and comfort. There's a reason why people go to Marty's: the atmosphere is friendly, the service is impeccable, and the drinks are top-notch."

== See also ==
- LGBTQ culture in Chicago
