= Margaret Chung =

First known American-born Chinese female physician

Margaret Jessie Chung
- 張瑪珠
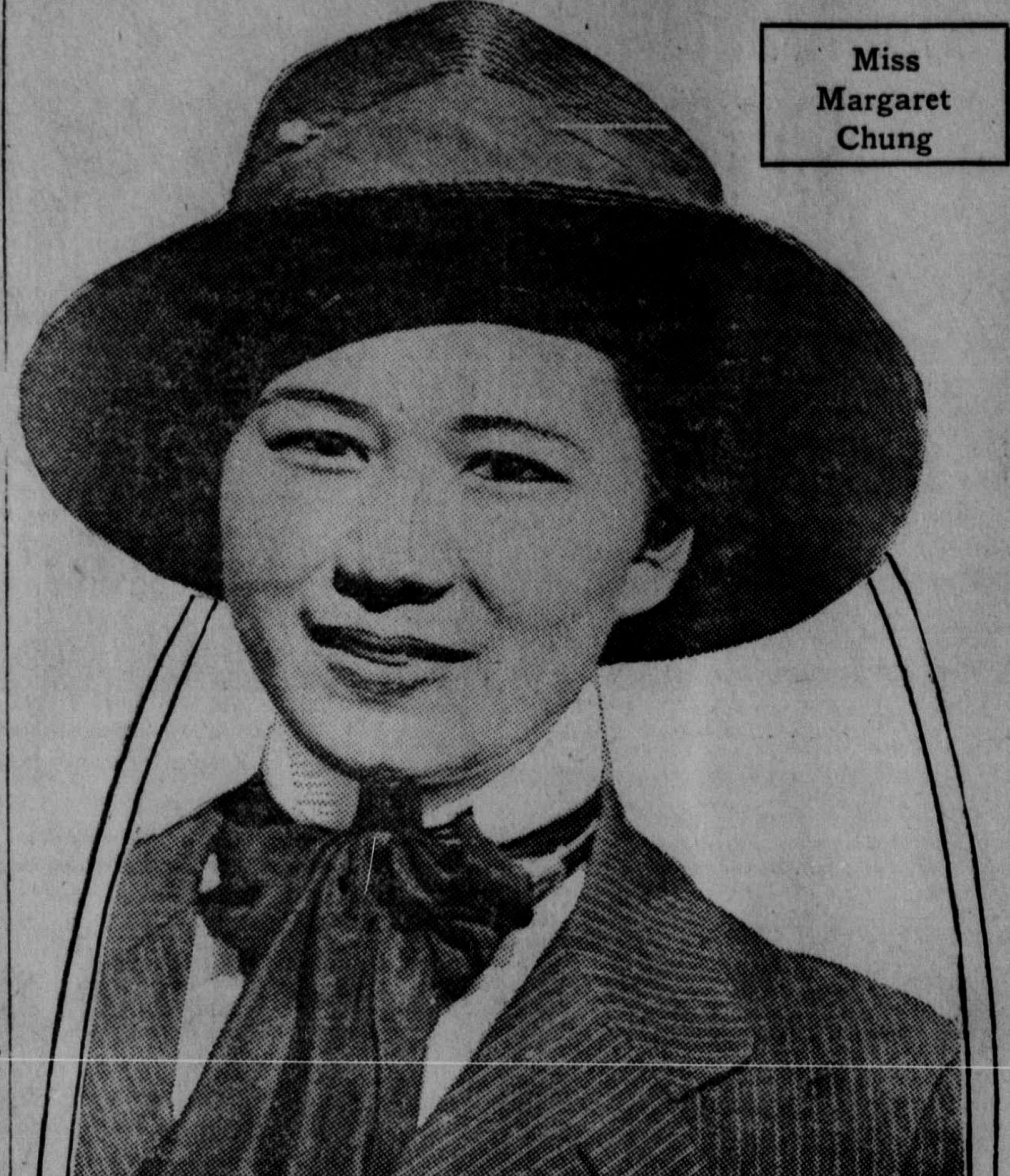
- Margaret "Mom" Chung in 1914
- Born: October 2, 1889; Santa Barbara, California
- Died: January 5, 1959 (aged 69); San Francisco, California
- Other name: "Mom" Chung
- Occupations: Surgeon, philanthropist
- Years active: Beginning in 1916
- Known for: First Chinese-American female physician; "adopting" 1,500+ servicemen in World War II; helped found the WAVES

Chinese name
- Chinese: 張瑪珠
- Simplified Chinese: 张玛珠
Transcriptions
Standard Mandarin
- Hanyu Pinyin: Zhāng Mǎzhū
Yue: Cantonese
- Jyutping: Zoeng^{1} Maa^{5} Zyu^{1}

Margaret Jessie Chung (Chinese: 張瑪珠, October 2, 1889 – January 5, 1959), born in Santa Barbara, California, was the first known American-born Chinese female physician. After graduating from the University of Southern California Medical School in 1916 and completing her internship and residency in Illinois, she established one of the first Western medical clinics in San Francisco's Chinatown in the early 1920s.

== Early life ==
Chung was born in Santa Barbara, the eldest of eleven children. At the time of her birth, the 1882 Chinese Exclusion Act was at its strongest. Her parents were born in China and were involved with Presbyterian Church missionaries, which significantly influenced their choices and Chung's early life. Her father, Chung Wong, was the foreman of the Rancho Guadalasca in Ventura County. Her mother, Ah Yane, also emigrated from China to California in the 1870s where she spent time in a mission home before working in agriculture and sometimes as a court interpreter. Her parents were denied U.S. citizenship, and faced difficulty finding work. The family moved to Los Angeles by 1902. Chung's father eventually died from injuries sustained in a car accident after being denied care at hospitals. She supported the family and helped to raise her younger siblings from the age of ten, disrupting her schooling.

In 1905, Chung was noted in the Los Angeles Herald as a promising student and for her planned future career as a newspaper reporter. She was noted in the Herald again in 1906 for her poem "Missionary Giving," delivered at the eighteenth anniversary of the Los Angeles Congregational Chinese mission. Chung wrote and delivered a paper entitled "Comparisons of Chinese and American Costumes" at the first anniversary of the Pasadena Congregational mission in 1907. By that fall, when she was 17, Chung had graduated from the eighth grade at the Seventh Street School and enrolled in the preparatory school at USC, being hailed as a "bright particular star" of the women's gymnasium class. In 1910, Chung won second place in a speech contest.

Women of every nation, every country, should learn medicine, so that they can teach the women of their countries and their races how to care for themselves and their children—how to improve the coming generation.

— Margaret Chung, Los Angeles Herald profile, 1914

Chung won a Los Angeles Times scholarship to study at USC by selling newspaper subscriptions to raise funds for her education and worked her way through college as a waitress, a seller of surgical instruments, and by winning cash prizes in several speech contests. In 1909, Chung graduated from USC. Chung enrolled in medical school in 1911, according to a 1914 profile that noted her belief that she was "the first Chinese girl to enter a medical school in this state." Chung took on a different identity, going by "Mike" and dressed in a long blazer, shirt, and tie.

Chung was raised Presbyterian.

== Professional career ==
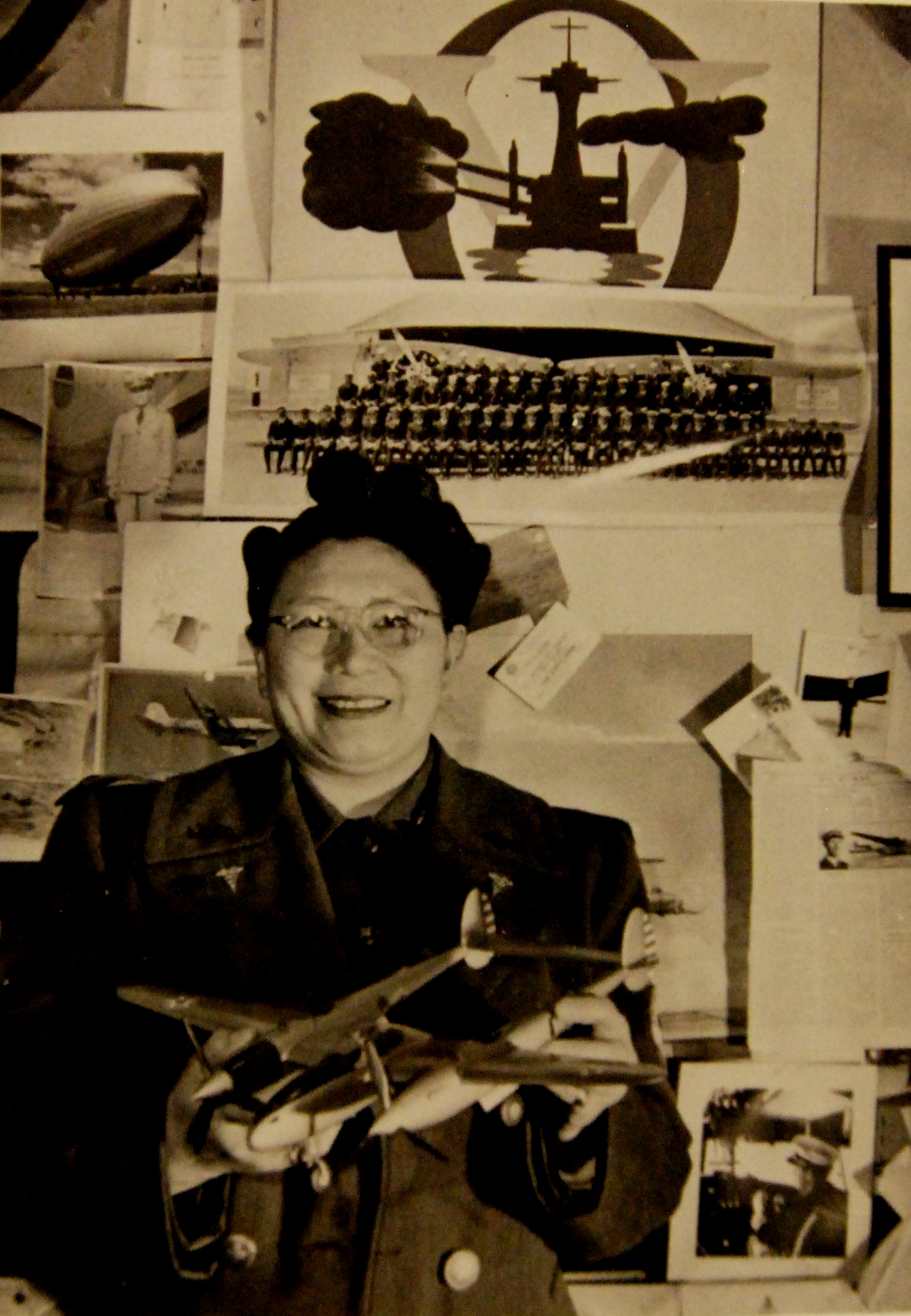
Dr. Chung with a Lockheed P-38 Lightning model and photos of some of her recruits

After graduating with a medical degree in 1916, she applied to be a medical missionary. Her application was rejected three times by administrative boards because, despite being born on United States soil, she was considered Chinese and therefore could not secure funds for missionary work. She settled for work as a surgical nurse in Los Angeles, at the Santa Fe Railroad Hospital. After several months, she left for Chicago, interning at the Mary Thompson Women's and Children's Hospital before serving her residency at the nearby Kankakee State Hospital. Chung would serve as the resident assistant in psychiatry for the first Juvenile Psychopathic Institute of the State of Illinois at the Cook County Hospital in 1917; she was later appointed state criminologist for Illinois. After two years in Illinois, Chung resigned from her position with Cook County in November 1918 and returned to Los Angeles following her father's death, accepting a position as a surgeon at Santa Fe Railroad Hospital, where she would go on to treat celebrities, including removing Mary Pickford's tonsils.

Chung moved to San Francisco's Chinatown in 1922 after experiencing the city while accompanying two patients, where she opened a private office. She treated the local Chinese American population as well as celebrities such as Sophie Tucker, Helen Hayes, and Tallulah Bankhead. Her practice was one of the few which would provide Chinese and Chinese Americans with Western medical care during a time when hospitals would often turn them away. In 1925, San Francisco's Chinese Hospital opened. Chung led the gynecology, obstetrics, and pediatrics unit as one of four department heads.

She also treated seven Navy reserve pilots during this time; part of her care was making them meals, and they reportedly soon began calling themselves "Mom Chung's Fair-Haired Bastard Sons" as a tribute to her. An alternative origin story for the "Mom Chung" nickname is that after eight pilots came to her in 1932, volunteering their services for China against Japan, she turned them down and fed them instead because "they looked starved". The pilots "ate everything she gave them, except eggs" because when they were destitute, the only vendor who would lend the pilots food on credit was an egg farmer. Prior to the United States entry into World War II, Chung would give her "adopted son" pilots a jade Buddha to wear around their necks, which would become a token by which the pilots would recognize each other throughout the world.

When Japan invaded China in 1937, Chung volunteered as a front-line surgeon, but she was secretly assigned instead to recruit pilots for the 1st American Volunteer Group, better known as the "Flying Tigers." During the war, Chung would serve up to 175 people at Thanksgiving at her house and wrapped and addressed 4,000 gifts at Christmas. Her houseguests included high ranking officers and US senators and congressmen; leaning on these connections, she helped establish the Women Accepted for Volunteer Emergency Service although she was not permitted to join them, as the government suspected that she was gay. Mom Chung adopted the entire VF-2 squadron, nicknamed "The Rippers" for their logo, which showed a Chinese dragon ripping a flag. VF-2 was assigned to USS Enterprise (CV-6) and would set an American record by shooting down 67 Japanese planes in a single day during the Great Marianas Turkey Shoot in June 1944. She also started a social network for pilots and other military personnel, politicians, and celebrities in California where she used her connections to recruit for war efforts and lobby for the creation of a women's naval reserve.

By the end of the war, Chung’s surrogate family had grown to more than 1,500. Aviators were part of the “Fair-Haired Bastards” group, while submarine men were called “Golden Dolphins”. All others were known as “Kiwis”. Most of Chung’s “children” were American servicemen, but Hollywood stars like John Wayne and Ronald Reagan were also included. So were politicians and top military officials like Fleet Admirals Chester W. Nimitz and William “Bull” Halsey Jr. The pilot and adventurer Amelia Earhart was one of her few “bastard daughters”.

In 1947, 90% of Chung's medical patients were white. She retired from medical practice within ten years after the end of World War II, and her "adopted sons" purchased a house for her in Marin County.

== Death ==
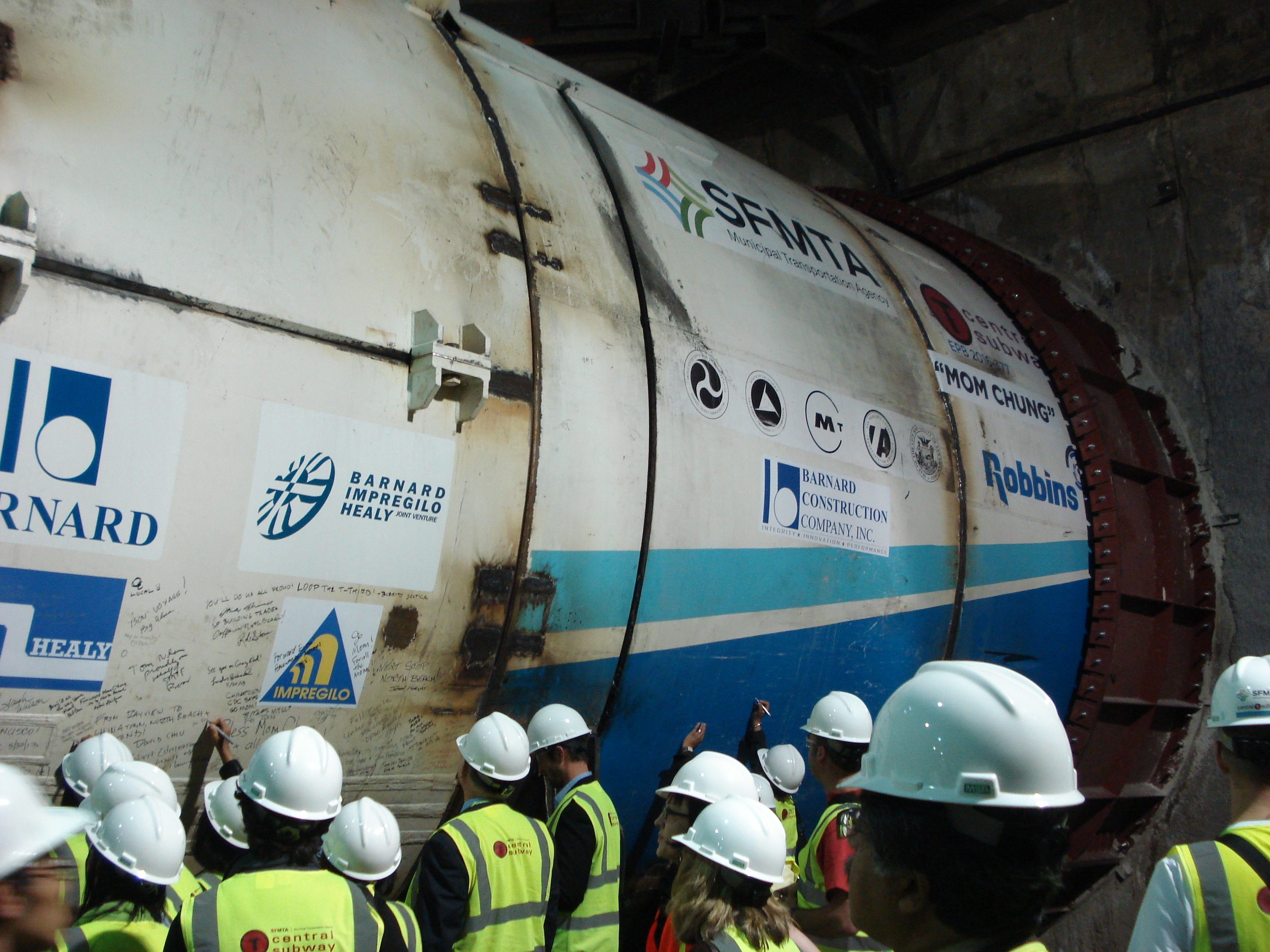
Signing the TBM "Mom Chung" on May 30, 2013

Chung died of cancer in January 1959 at Franklin Hospital in San Francisco. Among her pallbearers was Admiral Chester W. Nimitz, one of her "Golden Dolphins."

== Personal relationships ==
A pioneer in both professional and political realms, Chung led an unconventional personal life. As the only woman in her class, she adopted masculine dress and called herself "Mike," but after having established a professional practice she reverted to conventional dress and her female name.

Based on personal correspondence, she had close and apparently intense relationships with at least two other women, the writer Elsa Gidlow and entertainer Sophie Tucker, that some writers have speculated were romantic. Although she was briefly engaged, she never married.

An advocate of strong Sino-American relations, Chung was a neighbor, friend, and confidante of travel writer Richard Halliburton (1900–1939), who died in an attempt to sail the junk Sea Dragon, as a symbol of the bond of East and West, from Hong Kong to the 1939 Golden Gate International Exposition in San Francisco.

=== Military "sons" ===
Some of the notable "sons" of "Mom" Chung included:

- Albert B. Chandler, Sr. (no. 98), Governor and U.S. Senator from Kentucky
- William F. "Bull" Halsey (no. 600), Fleet Admiral of the United States Navy
- Andre Kostelanetz (no. 434), conductor
- Melvin Maas (no. 447), Major General of the United States Marine Corps and U.S. Representative from Minnesota
- Chester W. Nimitz (no. 100), Fleet Admiral of the United States Navy
- Russell Randall, Brigadier General of the United States Army Air Forces
- Ronald Reagan (no. 131), actor and President
- Walter F. Schlech Jr. (no. 108), Rear Admiral and Chief of Military Sealift Command, United States Navy
- William Sterling Parsons, Rear Admiral and bomb commander of Enola Gay
- Raymond E. Willis (no. 124), U.S. Senator from Indiana

== Commemorations ==
Chung reportedly served as inspiration for the character of Dr. Mary Ling in the 1939 film King of Chinatown, portrayed by Anna May Wong.

At least three Flying Fortresses were named "Mama Chung" in her honor by her "adopted" sons during World War II.

Chung was commemorated with a plaque in the Legacy Walk project on October 11, 2012, an outdoor public display which celebrates LGBT history and people.

A tunnel boring machine for the San Francisco Municipal Railway's Central Subway was named "Mom Chung" on March 7, 2013.
