= Legacy Walk =

Public display in Chicago, Illinois

Coordinates: 41°56′43″N 87°38′58″W

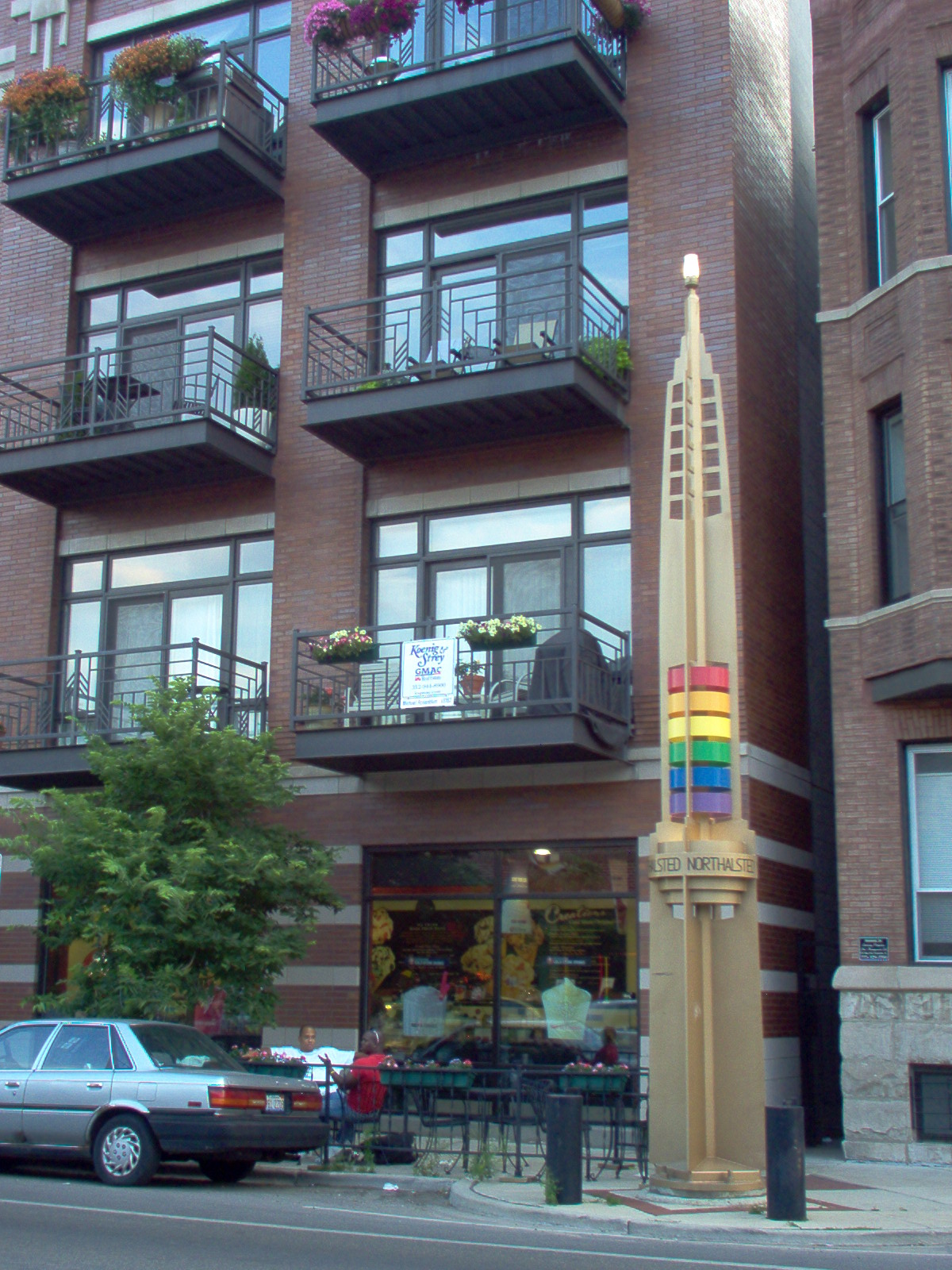
One of the many rainbow pylons on North Halsted Street in Chicago; the Legacy Walk on North Halsted Street welcomes visitors to the landmark gay village.

The Legacy Walk is an outdoor public display on North Halsted Street in Chicago, Illinois, United States, which celebrates LGBT contributions to world history and culture. According to its website, it is "the world's only outdoor museum walk and youth education program dedicated to combating anti-gay bullying by celebrating LGBT contributions to history." It is the world's largest collection of bronze biographical memorials.

== Inductees (all are featured on bronze memorials) ==
Name	inducted	Notes
Jane Addams	2012	Illinois 1860–1935. The founder of the social work profession in the United States.
Alvin Ailey	2012	Texas 1931–1989. Founded the Alvin Ailey American Dance Theater in NYC.
Reinaldo Arenas	2012	Cuba 1966–1990. Poet, novelist, and playwright.
James Baldwin	2012	NYC 1924–1987. Novelist, playwright, and activist.
Margaret Chung	2012	California 1889–1959. First Chinese-American woman physician.
Barbara Gittings	2012	Austria 1932–2007. Lesbian activist. Organized the New York chapter of the Daughters of Bilitis (DOB).
Keith Haring	2012	Pennsylvania 1958–1990. Pop artist who used his work to advocate for safer sex and AIDS awareness.
Barbara Jordan	2012	Texas 1936–1996. First African American elected to the Texas Senate after Reconstruction.
Christine Jorgensen	2012	NYC 1926–1989. Traveled to Denmark for hormones and gender confirmation surgery and became a public figure on her return to the US.
Frida Kahlo	2012	Mexico 1907–1954. Artist who painted many portraits, self-portraits and works inspired by nature.
Alfred Kinsey	2012	New Jersey 1894–1956. Biologist and sexologist known for the Kinsey Scale.
Leonard Matlovich	2012	Georgia 1943–1988. First gay service member to out himself to fight the military ban on gay people.
Harvey Milk	2012	New York 1930–1978. First openly gay elected official in the history of California (San Francisco Board of Supervisors). Milk and San Francisco Mayor George Moscone were assassinated by Dan White.
Antonia Pantoja	2012	Puerto Rico 1922–2002. Educator, social worker, feminist, civil rights leader and founder of ASPIRA.
Bayard Rustin	2012	Pennsylvania 1912–1987. Leader in social movements, civil rights, socialism, nonviolence, gay rights.
Alan Turing	2012	England 1912–1954. World War II code breaker and computer scientist. Died by suicide after being convicted of "gross indecency" for a consensual sexual relationship with another man.
Two-Spirit people	2012	This is one of the four Historic or Social Milestones on the Legacy Walk
Oscar Wilde	2012	Ireland 1854–1900. Poet and playwright convicted of "gross indecency" for having sex with other men.
Ruth Ellis	2013	Illinois 1899–2000. African American lesbian activist and centenarian.
Lorraine Hansberry	2013	Illinois 1930–1965. Playwright and writer. First African American woman to have a play performed on Broadway. First Chicago native honored on the Legacy Walk
Frank Kameny	2013	NYC 1925–2011. Gay rights activist and co-founder of the Mattachine Society. Dismissed from his position as astronomer in the army because of his homosexuality.
Tom Waddell	2013	New Jersey 1937–1987. Sportsman and competitor at the 1968 Summer Olympics who founded the Gay Games.
Walt Whitman	2013	New York 1819–1892. Poet, essayist, and journalist whose poem Leaves of Grass was described as obscene for its overt sensuality.
Mychal Judge	2014	New York 1933–2001. Fire Department chaplain became first certified fatality of the September 11 attacks.
David Kato	2014	Uganda 1964–2011. Murdered after a magazine published his photo as Uganda's first openly gay man.
Audre Lorde	2014	NYC 1934–1992. Black writer, feminist, womanist, and civil rights activist
Cole Porter	2014	Indiana 1891–1964. Composer and songwriter who won the first Tony Award for Best Musical Kiss Me, Kate.
Sally Ride	2014	California 1951–2012. NASA Space Shuttle Challenger astronaut, physicist, and engineer.
Stonewall Riots	2014	NYC 1969. This is one of the four Historic or Social Milestones on the Legacy Walk.
Mildred "Babe" Didrikson Zaharias	2014	Texas 1911–1956. Won two gold medals in track and field at the 1932 Summer Olympics.
Josephine Baker	2015	Missouri 1906–1975. World War Two spy, dancer, singer, civil rights activist. First African American woman to be inducted into French Pantheon.
Leonard Bernstein	2015	Massachusetts 1918–1990. Composer, conductor, author, music lecturer, and pianist known for West Side Story.
Rudolf Nureyev	2015	Siberia 1938–1993. Choreographer of the Paris Opera Ballet known for Swan Lake.
Billy Strayhorn	2015	Ohio 1915–1967. Jazz composer, pianist, lyricist, and arranger, best remembered for "Take the 'A' Train".
The Pink Triangle	2015	This is one of the four Historic or Social Milestones on the Legacy Walk
Sylvia Rivera	2016	NYC 1951–2002. Founding member of Gay Liberation Front, Gay Activists Alliance and STAR.
Vito Russo	2016	NYC 1946–1990. Film historian. Author of The Celluloid Closet: Homosexuality in the Movies.
The Harlem Renaissance	2017	
Marsha P. Johnson	2018	
Pyotr Ilyich Tchaikovsky	2018	
Freddie Mercury	2020	
Sylvester	2020	
Pauli Murray	2021	
The Legacy of Matthew Shepard	2021	
Alan L. Hart	2022	
Daniel Sotomayor	2022	
José Sarria	2022	
Glenn Burke	2023	
The Road to Marriage Equality	2023	
Leonardo da Vinci	2024	

== History ==
The Legacy Project was conceived at the National March on Washington for GLBT Civil Rights in 1987. The advent of the NAMES Project AIDS Memorial Quilt, the first recognition of what would become National Coming Out Day (October 11), the first Act Up civil disobedience at the U.S. Supreme Court, and the simple experience of being at the March itself inspired the Legacy Walk's creators to propose an outdoor LGBT history installation that would leap-frog over the education system which failed to acknowledge and teach about LGBT contributions to world history and culture. The City of Chicago became the logical site because, in 1991, it had established the first Gay and Lesbian Hall of Fame to recognize the contributions of Chicago's LGBT community; and because, in 1998, the City of Chicago had dedicated the "Rainbow Pylon" streetscape on North Halsted Street to define the cultural and business nexus of Chicago's LGBT community. The dedication of the rainbow pylon streetscape brought to an end the eleven-year search for a site to house the outdoor museum. Planning for the Legacy Walk's creation and fundraising for its launch took 13 years. The inaugural dedication of the Legacy Walk's first eighteen bronze memorials took place on National Coming Out Day, October 11, 2012 – exactly 25 years to the day that the idea was first conceived. Each year on the anniversary of its creation, additional bronze memorials are added.

== Today ==
As of 2024 the Legacy Walk consists of fifty bronze memorials, each of which is digitally linked to a cloud-based system accessed either by scanning a QR Code or by activating a microchip on each marker with Near Field Communication technology. This opens a portal in users' smartphones to watch video and download education resources. The Legacy Walk is joined by its cousin – the traveling "Legacy Wall" – which began a state-wide tour in 2015. In 2017 the Legacy Wall began a national tour that has taken LGBT contributions to world history and culture on the road by visiting libraries, high school and university campuses, cultural institutions, civic plazas, and corporate headquarters across the country.

== See also ==
- Center on Halsted
- Chicago LGBT Hall of Fame
- LGBT culture in Chicago
- Boystown
