= Sidetrack (Chicago) =

Gay bar in Chicago, Illinois, U.S.

- Interactive map of Sidetrack
- Address: 3349 North Halsted Street; Chicago, Illinois; United States
- Coordinates: 41°56′35.4″N 87°38′57″W

Construction
- Opened: 1982

Website
- sidetrackchicago.com

Sidetrack is a gay bar on Halsted Street in Chicago, in the U.S. state of Illinois.

== Description ==
Sidetrack is a two-story, 15,000-square-foot (1,400 m^{2}) bar that spans eight storefronts. It has six rooms and a rooftop deck. Sidetrack hosts themed video nights.

== History ==
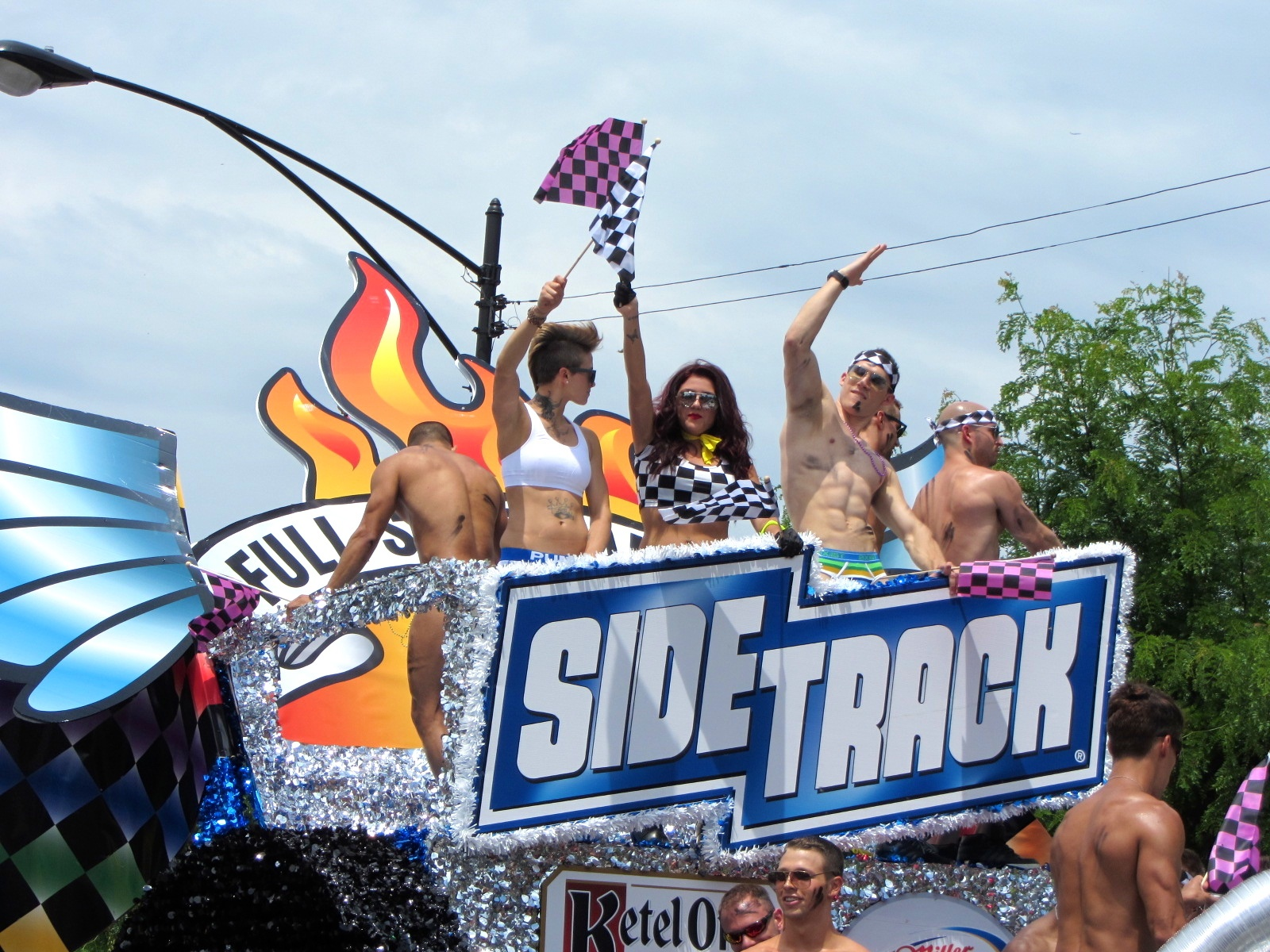
Sidetrack representation at Chicago's 2013 pride parade

Established in 1982, Sidetrack is owned by Art Johnston and Jose "Pepe" Peña,

In 2013, Sidetrack boycotted Stoli Vodka over Russia's anti-gay laws. In 2023, the business announced they would stopped selling Anheuser-Busch products in response to the company's decision to drop it's ad campaign featuring Dylan Mulvaney in response to the Bud Light boycott .

== Reception ==
The Chicago Sun-Times has called Sidetrack "one of the world's top gay bars". Sidetrack ranked first in Time Out Chicago's 2023 list of the city's best LGBTQ+ bars. Sidetrack has been called the "most popular bar in Illinois" by BuzzFeed and "one of the 50 top gay bars in the US" by Yelp.

== See also ==
- LGBT culture in Chicago
