= Center on Halsted =

LGBTQ non-profit organization in Illinois, USA

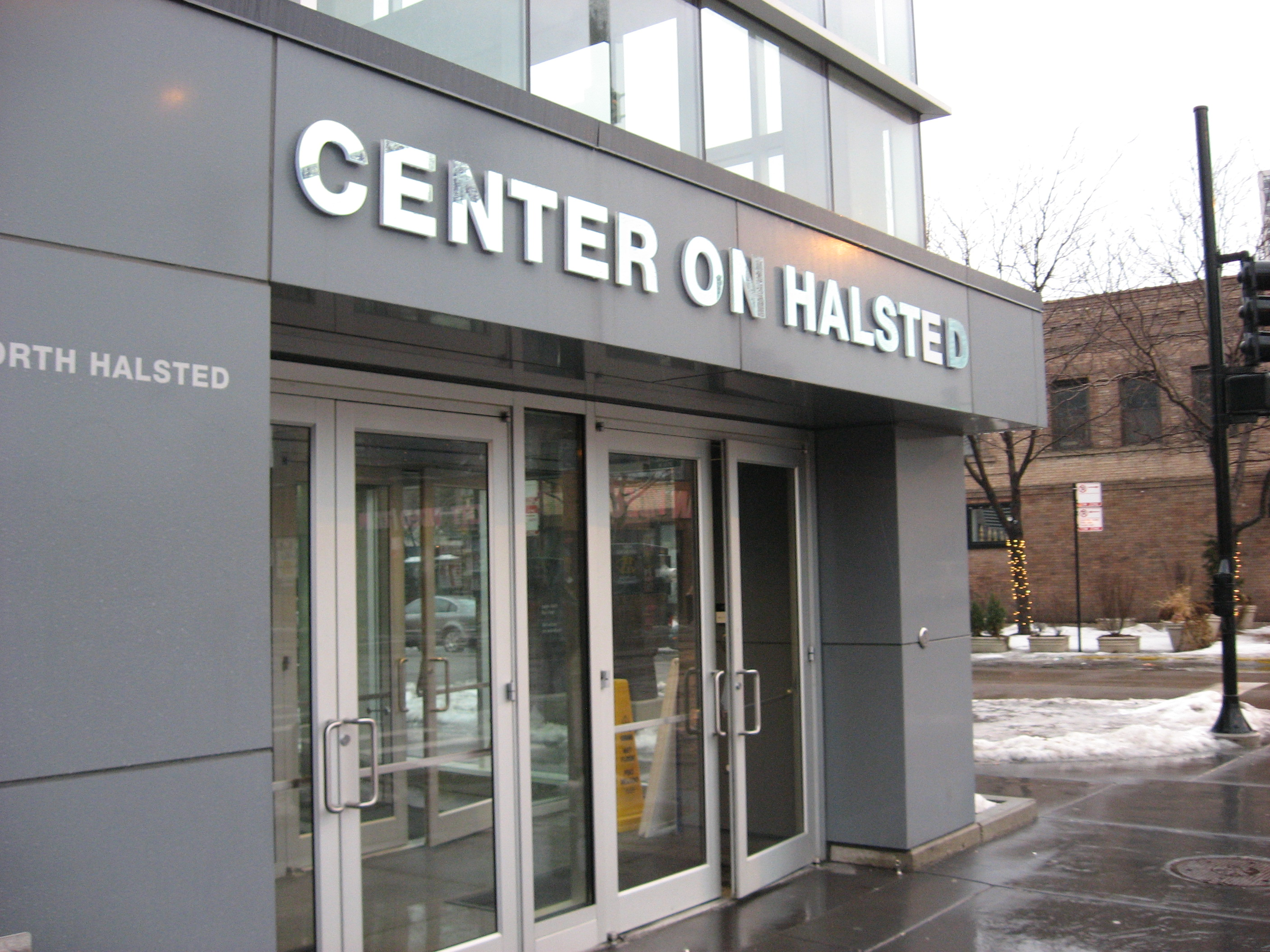
- Founded: 1973; 53 years ago
- Type: Nonprofit organization
- Tax ID no.: 51-0178807
- Legal status: 501(c)(3)
- Location: Lakeview, Chicago, Illinois, USA
- Coordinates: 41.949064°N 87.649628°W
- Chief Executive Officer: Joli Robinson
- Chief Program Officer: Editha Paras
- Chair: Victor Ravago
- Revenue: $5,789,604 (2020)
- Expenses: $5,841,775 (2020)
- Endowment: $4,647,591 _{(2020)}
- Employees: 101 (2019)
- Volunteers: 400 (2019)
- Website: www.centeronhalsted.org
- Formerly called: Gay Horizons, Horizons Community Services

Center on Halsted is a lesbian, gay, bisexual, and transgender (LGBTQ) community center in Chicago, Illinois.

The center is located in the Lakeview neighborhood on the corner of Halsted Street and Waveland, attached to Whole Foods Market. It is open every day from 8 am to 9 pm. Patrons participate in the diverse public programs and social services offered at Center on Halsted — ranging from volleyball and cooking classes to rapid HIV testing and group therapy.

== History ==
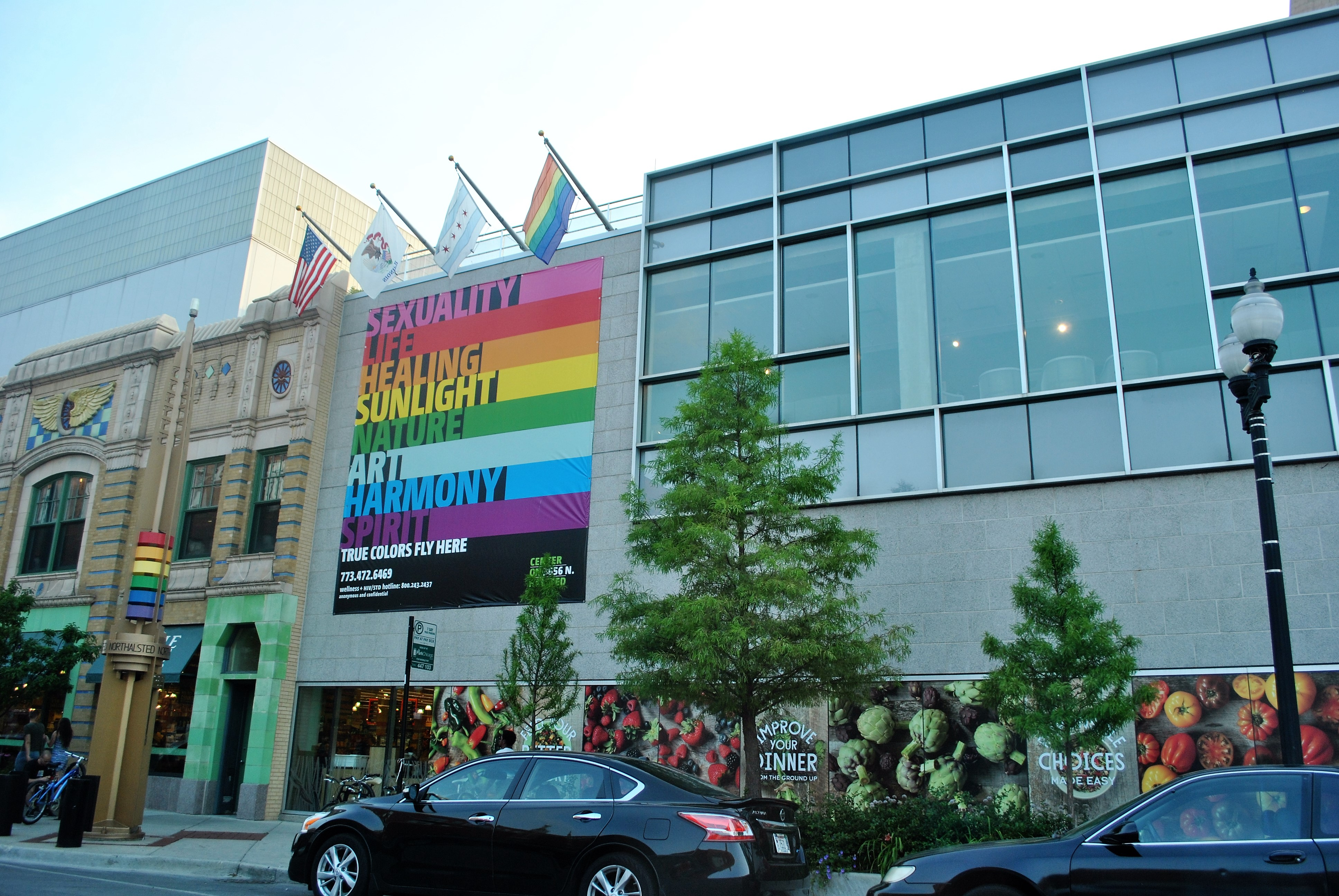
Center on Halsted

In 1973, Gay Horizons was established by a group of volunteers. Over time, the organization evolved and changed its name to Horizons Community Services, becoming a comprehensive LGBT social services agency. In 2003, Horizons Community Services was renamed Center on Halsted. The core programming of Horizons Community Services remained while new services were envisioned and realized.

After a $20-million capital campaign involving 2,000 donors, Center on Halsted opened its 175,000 sq ft (16,300 m^{2}) Leadership in Energy and Environmental Design-certified building in 2007 with Whole Foods as an anchor tenant and two levels of underground parking. A major contributor was Miriam Hoover (of The Hoover Company) who donated $1 million.

Major funding for the center came through private/corporate donations, with additional funding and support from the City of Chicago. The support of Chicago's then-mayor was recognized by the construction of the Richard M. Daley Rooftop Garden.

In 2019, after protests about the previous security firm employed by the Center on Halsted, the organization changed security vendors.

== Programs and services ==
Center on Halsted develops and hosts an array of public programs open to the public that provide fun, educational and enlightening opportunities for members of the LGBT community and allies. These include:

- Athletic programs: A full gymnasium used by more than 300 community members/week including five recreational leagues and activities including basketball, volleyball, hockey and yoga.
- Art and Cultural programs: Regular art exhibits, film screenings, dance and live performances hosted in the state of the art theater attracting more than 5,000 attendees/year.
- Community Cyber Center: Providing free Internet access and technology training to more than 2,100 patrons/year.
- Affinity Programs: Specific cultural events, workshops, discussions and networking opportunities for various affinity groups within the LGBT Community including bisexuals, transgender people, women and LGBT families.
- Senior programs: Cultural outings, workshops and social space bringing more than 150 LGBT Seniors together each week. More than 8,300 meals provided to seniors annually.
- Culinary Arts: Comprehensive training in culinary arts provided by community chefs for new and continuing education students.
- Community Meeting Space: Convenient, state-of-the art meeting and recreational space available for rent for community members and organizations.

Center on Halsted works with city and state governments and an array of local providers to provide comprehensive social services to LGBT and ally community members in need including:

- Mental Health Services: Individual, group and family counseling for 500 community members/year on a sliding scale, resulting in more than 5,000 clinical hours. Special focus includes healthy LGBT living, coming out, HIV/AIDS and LGBT domestic violence and abuse.
- Support Groups: Group meetings offering support for community members on a variety of topics including coming out, grief and loss, living with HIV and 12-step recovery.
- Sexual Orientation & Gender Institute: Licensed training for local mental health graduate students and practitioners in LGBT and cultural competency and professional development.
- Legal Services: Free legal consultations, workshops and referrals serving more than 500 community members/year.
- Anti-Violence Project: Therapy, social services, court advocacy and incident reporting for more than 200 victims of domestic violence and abuse in the LGBT community every year.
- HIV Testing: Free, confidential, anonymous testing and support serving more than 2,500 community members/year.
- State of Illinois AIDS/HIV & STD Hotline: Free, confidential counseling and referrals serving nearly 14,000 callers/year from across Illinois and the Midwest.
- Youth Services: Leadership training, professional development, crisis intervention, housing assistance, art therapy and case management.
- Mr. International Rubber Contest held in November 2013. COH gave up all of its social programs for a weekend to host this event.

The center works in collaboration with other Chicago nonprofits. Collaborators in the past have included the Museum of Contemporary Art, After School Matters, The Chicago Historical Society, The University of Chicago, The Chicago Architecture Foundation, the School of the Art Institute of Chicago, the Garfield Park Conservatory, the Chicago Blackhawks and the Chicago Cubs.

Center on Halsted also hosts a number of smaller community organizations in its space as Resident Partners. These include the Association of Latino Men for Action, Athletic Alliance of Chicago, IMPACT Program at Northwestern University, Lakeside Pride Music Ensembles, NAMES Project, Northalsted Business Alliance, Windy City Performing Arts and Windy City Rainbow Alliance of the Deaf.

== See also ==
- List of LGBT community centers
- National Gay and Lesbian Sports Hall of Fame
- LGBT culture in Chicago
- Legacy Walk
- Chicago LGBT Hall of Fame
- Boystown
