= Al Menbar =

Al Menbar may refer to either of two political organizations in Bahrain:

- Al-Menbar Islamic Society
- Al-Menbar Progressive Democratic Society
- Al-Menbar Media. A media company established by Yasser Al-Habib

== See also ==
- Minbar, the type of pulpit
