= Doug Ischar =

American artist

Douglas Ischar (born 1948 in Honolulu, Hawaii) is an openly gay, American artist known for his work in documentary photography, installation art, sound art and video art addressing stereotypes of masculinity and male behavior. He currently lives and works in Chicago, where he teaches art at the University of Illinois at Chicago. Ischar serves on the curatorial board of Chicago's Iceberg Projects, a not-for-profit experimental exhibition space.

== Biography ==
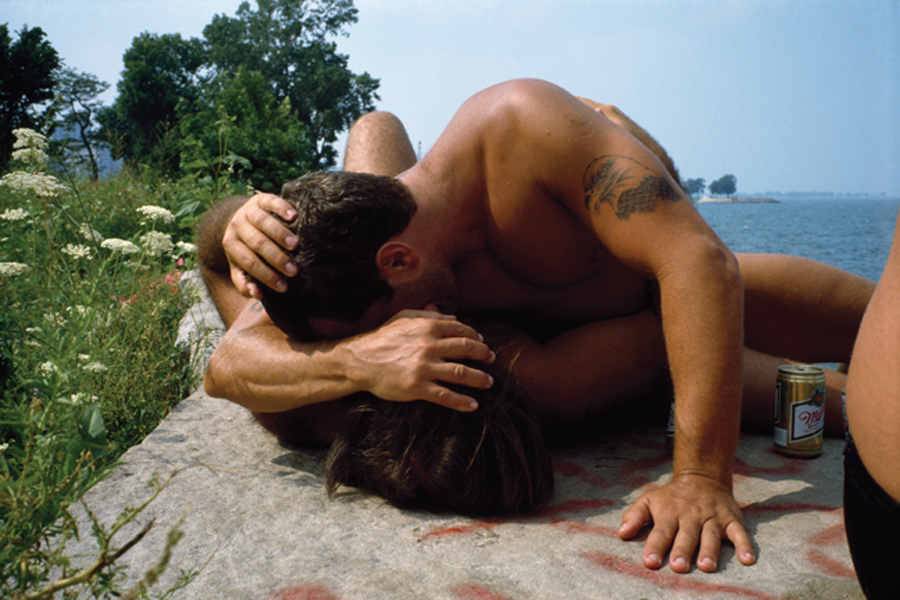
Marginal Waters 22 (1985)

Trained as a classical cellist, Ischar began studying art in his thirties, eventually earning an M.F.A. degree from CalArts in 1987.

Ischar's early work, the documentary photographs collected in the series Marginal Waters (1985) and Honor Among (1987), participated in then-contemporary debates around gender and representation, with a particular emphasis on problems of masculinity in American gay male culture.

His artwork from the mid-1990s emerged at a moment when the exploration of media, and cross-disciplinary practices, were critical actions further complicating the then-peculiar state of semiotics. Ischar’s editing of appropriated moving image and static objects addressed the practical and visual boundaries for definitions of masculinity, sexuality, violence and secrecy.

The artist's single-channel video works of the past ten years are more allusive and poetic, addressing political and theoretical concerns obliquely via densely constructed image-sound montages whose explicit subjects range from the relationship between Maria Callas and Pier Paolo Pasolini (Come Lontano, 2010) to the life of Charlotte Brontë (CB, 2011). Many of Ischar's recent videos draw heavily on his early training in, and love of, classical music.

== Work ==
Ischar is currently represented by Golden Gallery (Chicago / New York). His video works are distributed by Chicago's Video Data Bank. The artist has exhibited at, among other locations: the Whitney Museum of American Art, the Museum of Contemporary Art, Chicago, the Museum of Contemporary Photography, São Paulo Museum of Modern Art, Museum of Fine Arts (Houston), Göteborgs Konsthall, the Center for Curatorial Studies at Bard College (Annandale-on-Hudson, New York) and the Institute of the Visual Arts at the University of Wisconsin–Milwaukee.

=== Exhibition catalogues ===
2014 – Whitney Biennial, Whitney Museum of American Art, New York
2012 – Sleepless, Golden Gallery, New York (solo)
2011 – Honor Among: San Francisco 1987, Golden Gallery, Chicago (solo)
2009 – Marginal Waters, Golden Gallery, Chicago (solo)
2002 – Out of Place, Museum of Contemporary Art, Chicago
2001 – Doug Ischar: User, Institute for the Visual Arts, University of Wisconsin–Milwaukee (solo)
1998 – InSite '97 Public Art Work by Artists of the Americas
1996 – Conceal/Reveal, Site Santa Fe, Santa Fe, NM

1995 – Pervert, University of California, Irvine
1994 – Dark O’Clock, Plug In Editions, Winnipeg and Museo de Arte Moderna, São Paulo

1993 – Randolph Street Gallery, Chicago

1993 – Doug Ischar: Orderly, List Visual Arts Center, MIT
1991 – Reframing the Family, Artists Space, New York
1990 – How Can They Be So Sure, Los Angeles Contemporary Exhibitions (LACE)

=== Scholarly books ===
The Logic of the Lure, John Paul Ricco, University of Chicago Press, 2003
Disrupted Borders (12-artist anthology with essay by Sunil Gupta), Rivers Oram Press, London, UK, 1993

=== Articles and reviews ===
2009

- Grabner, Michelle. “Doug Ischar at Golden,” Art Forum.
- Elms, Anthony. “Doug Ischar: Marginal Waters,” Art Papers.

2002

- Estep, Jan. “Doug Ischar at the Hyde Park Art Center,” New Art Examiner.

1999

- Daniel, Jeff. “Without a Heavy Hand,” St. Louis Post Dispatch.
- Grahn-Hinnfors, Gunilla. “Doug Ischar på Göteborgs Konstmuseum,” Paletten.

1998

- Tuer, Dot. “Transnational Terrains,” Canadian Art.

1997

- Martin, Victoria. “InSite in San Diego and Tijuana,” Artweek.
- Knight, Christopher. “InSite, Outta Sight,” Los Angeles Times.
- Lord, Catherine. “Smoking Guns,” Art & Text.

1996

- Campeau, Sylvain. “Doug Ischar, Oboro,” Parachute.

1995

- Porges, Tim. “Doug Ischar at TBA,” New Art Examiner.
- Connor, Thomas. “Doug Ischar at TBA Exhibitions,” C.

1995

- Kandel, Susan. “Cool Ambiguity,’ Doug Ischar at Jan Kesner Gallery,” Los Angeles Times.
- Curtis, Cathy. “Exposing Pervert,” Los Angeles Times.
- Taylor, Kate. “A Telling Critique of Mass Media,” Toronto Globe and Mail.

1994

- Bonetti, David. “Three Installations Put a Face on Cultural Identity,” San Francisco Examiner.
- Wilson Loyd, Ann. “Doug Ischar,” Art in America.
- Gillmor, Alison. “Artist Takes a Dark, Edgy Look at Gays,” Winnipeg Free Press.

1993

- Meyer, Richard. “Doug Ischar,” Art and Text.
- Freeland, Cynthia. “Public Privates,” Afterimage.
- Troy, Maria. “Doug Ischar,” P-Form.
- Taylor, Robert. “Balka, Ischar and Goldsmith at MIT,” Boston Globe.
- Otto, Susan. “Doug Ischar,” New Art Examiner.

1992

- Bright, Deborah. “Family Practices,” Views.

1991

- Bonetti, David. “No More Heros,” San Francisco Examiner.

1990

- Gipe, Lawrence. “The Photograph as Verisimilitude: Millie Wilson and Doug Ischar,” Visions.
- Yingling, Thomas. “How the Eye is Caste: Robert Mapplethorpe and the Limits of Controversy,” Discourse.
- Kotz, Liz. “Guilty Objects, Unattainable Desires,” Afterimage.
