= Chicago Pride Parade =

Annual LGBT event in Chicago

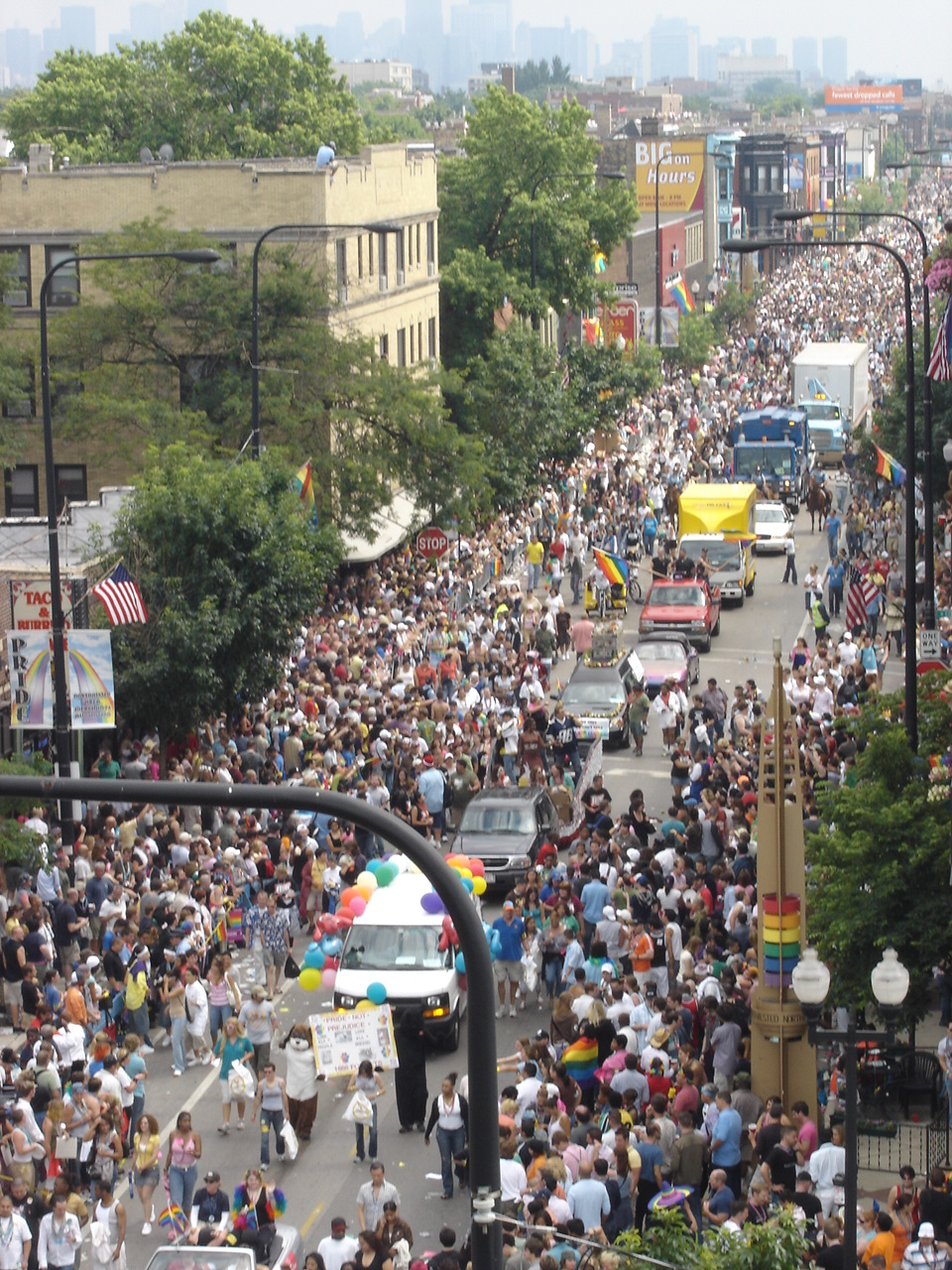
- The Chicago Pride Parade 2006, on Halsted Street at Brompton Avenue
- Status: Active
- Genre: Pride parade
- Location: Chicago
- Country: USA
- Inaugurated: June 27, 1970
- Participants: 15,000
- Attendance: +1 million
- Organizer: PRIDEChicago
- Website: pridechicago.org

"Video coverage of the 2007 Chicago Gay Pride Parade."

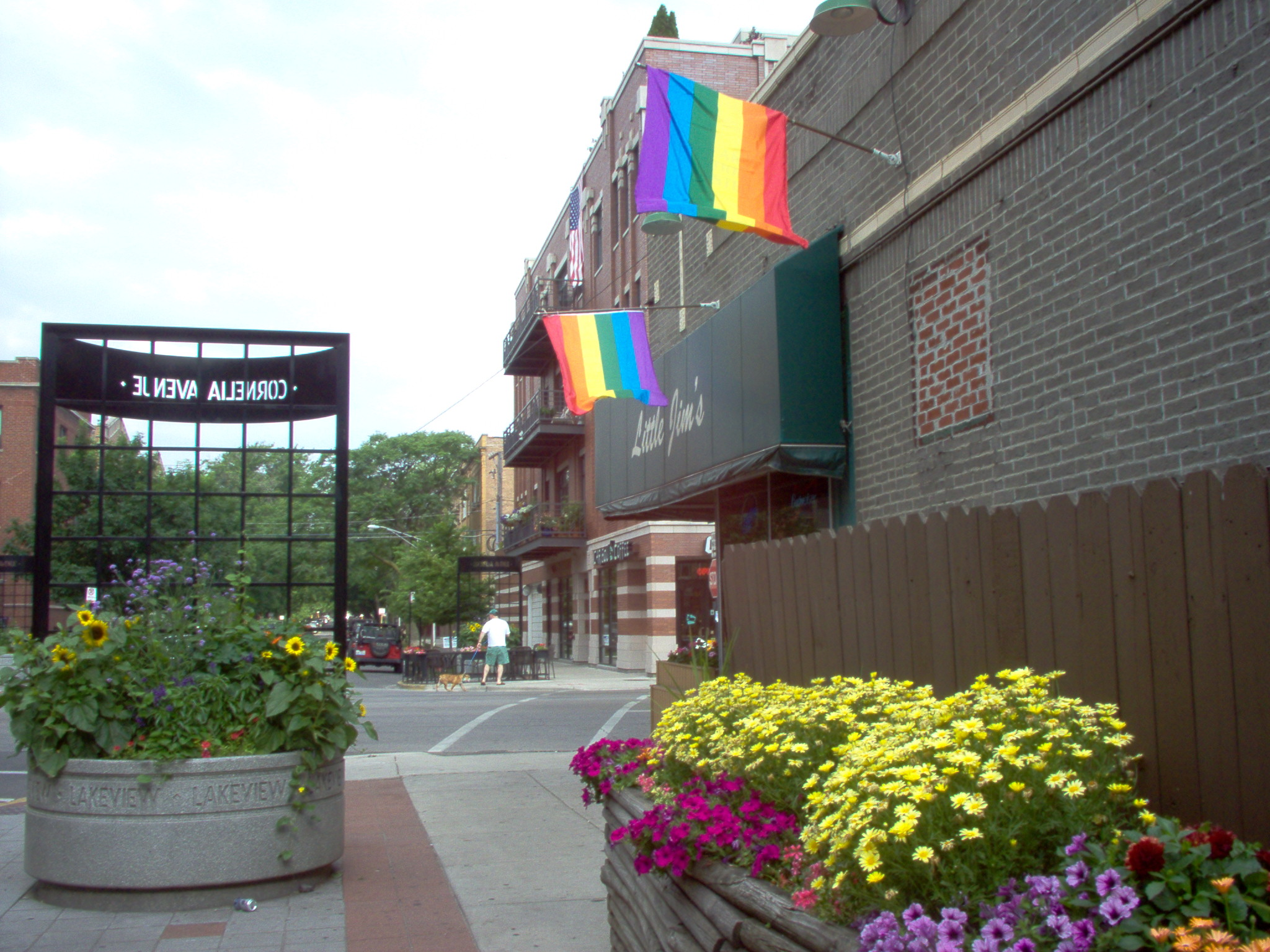
Rainbow flags decorate Lake View East in anticipation of the Chicago Pride Parade.

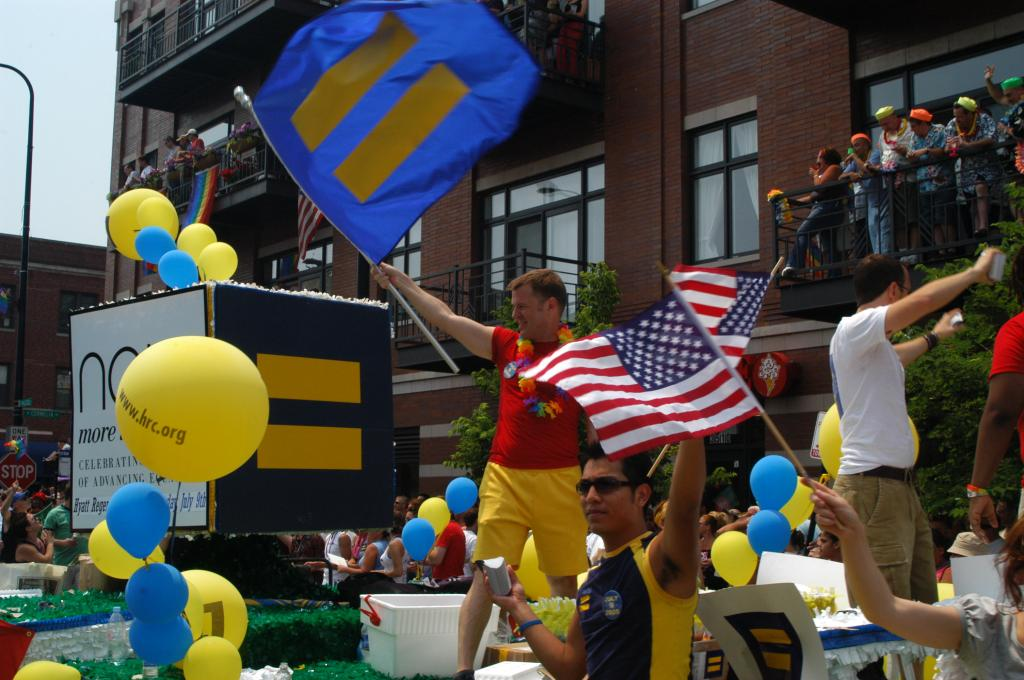
A Human Rights Campaign float moves past spectators.

The Chicago Pride Parade, also colloquially (and formerly) called the Chicago Gay Pride Parade, is an annual pride parade held on the last Sunday of June in Chicago, Illinois in the United States. It is considered a culmination of the larger Gay and Lesbian Pride Month in Chicago, as promulgated by the Chicago City Council and Mayor of Chicago. Chicago's Pride Parade is the oldest, and one of the largest by attendance in the world.

The annual pride parade is organized by the all-volunteer nonprofit organization PRIDEChicago.

== History ==
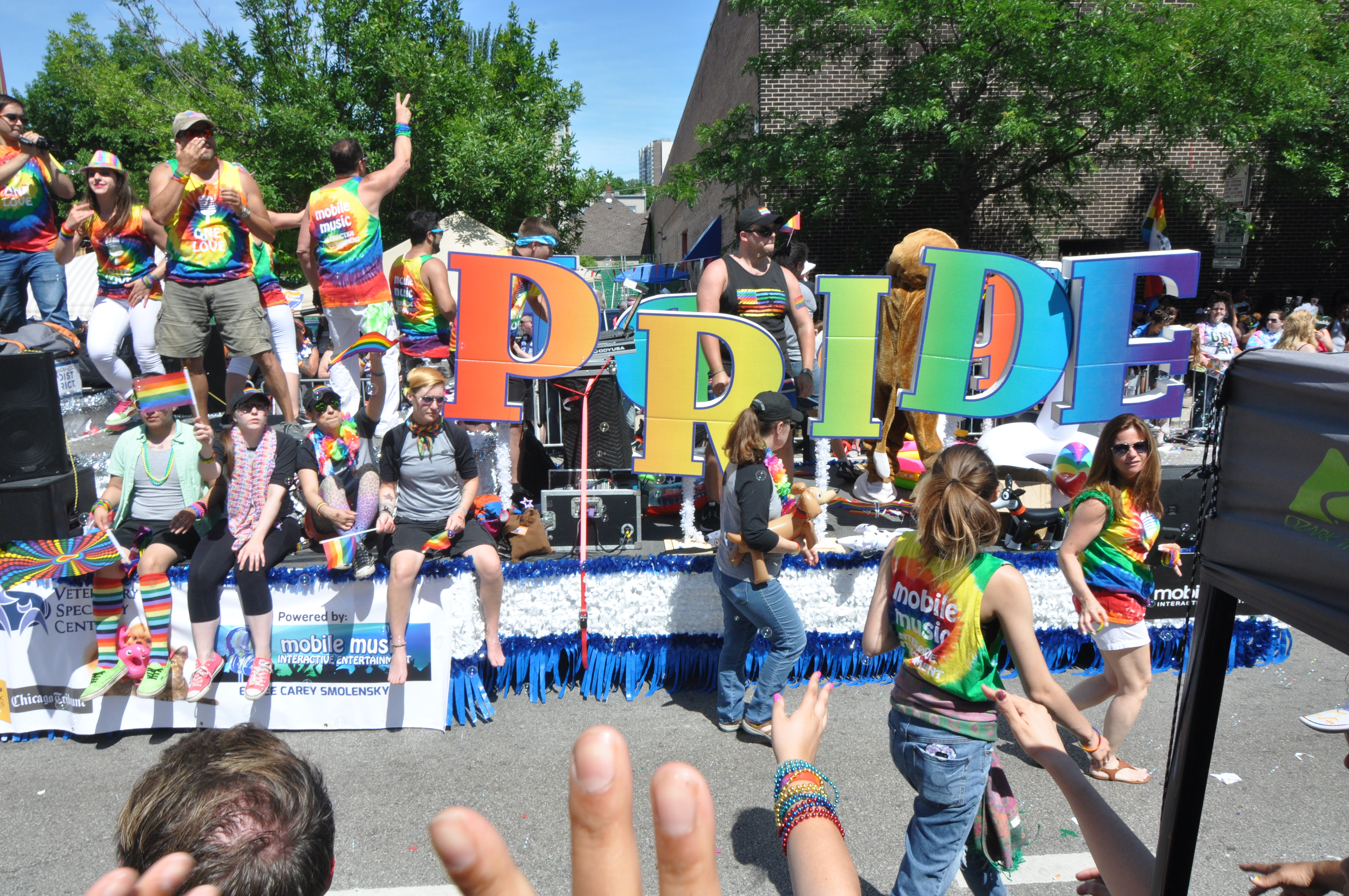
Chicago Gay Pride Parade 2018

The first parade was organized on Saturday, June 27, 1970, as a march from Washington Square Park ("Bughouse Square") to the Water Tower, but then many of the participants spontaneously marched on to the Civic Center Plaza. For many years, the parade was held only in Lake View East, a neighborhood enclave of the Lakeview community area. Recent parades have expanded their outreach (and ability to handle crowds) by extending the route into the Uptown neighborhood, beginning at the corner of Broadway and Montrose. The parade then proceeds south on Broadway to Halsted, continues south on Halsted to Belmont, then east on Belmont to Broadway and finally south again on Broadway to Cannon Drive and Lincoln Park.

With the increasing political participation of gay, lesbian, bisexual and transgender Americans and the community's relatively high financial resources through political action groups and as individual donors, Illinois politicians have increased their presence at the Chicago Pride Parade. Both the Illinois Democratic and Republican parties have been heavily represented, including by former Governor Rod Blagojevich, a Democrat, and former Treasurer Judy Baar Topinka, a Republican. Both had strong support from many gay and lesbian voters.

On June 28, 2009, more than 500,000 spectators watched the 40th Annual Chicago Pride Parade. Among the entries were several marching bands, dance troupes, twirlers, and many political figures. The 2010 parade featured an appearance from the Chicago Blackhawks' Brent Sopel and the Stanley Cup as part of the Chicago Gay Hockey Association's float. Sopel appeared in the parade to honor Brendan Burke, the gay son of the Maple Leafs' GM Brian Burke. Due to Chicago being one of the largest cities with a massive sports community, some other special guests have attended the Gay Pride Parade in Chicago, those include David Kopay (NFL running back), Billy Bean (major league outfielder) and Greg Louganis (Olympic diver).

The 2011 parade included 250 entries and was attended by over 800,000 spectators, almost double the previous year, causing massive overcrowding and resulted in a reorganization of the parade route for the 2012 parade. Starting in 2013 the Chicago Pride Parade had reached over one million people each year, and the number continues to grow.

In October 2019, Richard Pfeiffer, director of the Parade since 1974, passed away.

The parade was cancelled in 2020 due to the COVID-19 pandemic. The 2021 parade was postponed to October 3, 2021, in the hopes that an in-person parade could be held. Due to the Delta variant, the 2021 parade was cancelled. The 2022 and 2023 pride parade continued with its original scheduling under the direction of Pfeiffer’s husband, Tim Frye.

The 2024 parade marched with a new start time (11 a.m.), shorter route and 150 entries as the city sought to lessen its strain on various Chicago departments during a busy summer packed with other large-scale events, including the Democratic National Convention. Fortune Feimster was the 2024 grand marshal and the parade theme was Pride is Power.

On October 27, 2024, the City of Chicago recognized long-time parade coordinator Richard Pfeiffer with an honorary street sign "Rich Pfeiffer Parade Way" at the northwest corner of Belmont Avenue and North Halsted Street along the parade's route in Lake View, Chicago.

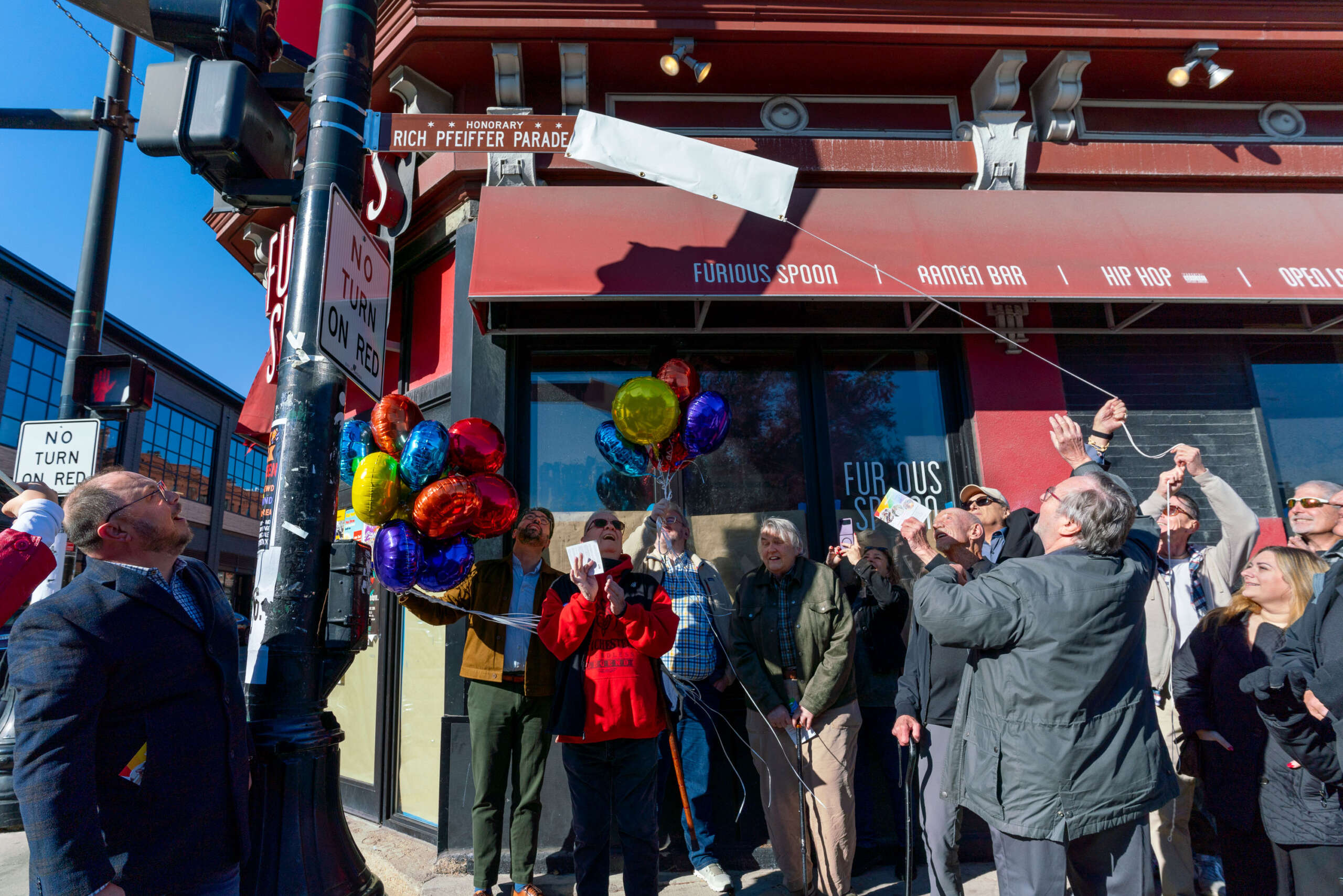
Chicago honors Richard Pfeiffer

The 55th Chicago Pride Parade was held on June 28, 2026 on a 2-mile route stepping off from Grace Street (3800 North) and Broadway and ending at Diversey Parkway (2800 North).

== Pre-Parade Celebration ==
The year 2019 marked the 19th Annual Pre-Parade Celebration, also known as Chicago's two day long Pride Festival. 2019's Chicago Pride Festival saw over 100,000 people, the festival is held on the Saturday and Sunday before the Pride Parade. Each year there is a suggested twenty dollar donation while entering the festival for LGBTQ fundraisers, events, etc. The festival is open rain or shine and held in Boystown, a neighborhood of Lake View, Chicago. The streets are blocked off from traffic so the celebration can take place throughout the streets all weekend long. Each year there are multiple different performers performing on the three main stages at the festival. Some of 2021's performers included Betty Who, LeAnn Rimes, Pabllo Vittar, Alex Newell and Inaya Day. The Pre-Parade Celebration is just one of the many events held in Boystown in the month of June. Chicago Pride Fest is organized by the Northalsted Business Alliance.

== Dates and estimated attendance ==
Edition	Date	Attendance	Ref(s).
1st	June 28, 1970	150–200	
2nd	June 27, 1971	1,000	
3rd	June 25, 1972	1,000-1,500	
4th	June 24, 1973	1,000-2,000	
5th	June 30, 1974	2,000	
6th	June 29, 1975	2,000-3,000	
7th	June 27, 1976	3,000	
8th	June 26, 1977	3,000	
9th	June 25, 1978	10,000	
10th	June 24, 1979	10,000	
11th	June 29, 1980	10,000	
12th	June 28, 1981	20,000	
13th	June 27, 1982	30,000	
14th	June 26, 1983	30,000	
15th	June 24, 1984	30,000+	
16th	June 30, 1985	35,000	
17th	June 29, 1986	40,000	
18th	June 28, 1987	40,000+	
19th	June 26, 1988	50,000	
20th	June 25, 1989	60,000+	
21st	June 24, 1990	100,000	
22nd	June 30, 1991	100,000+	
23rd	June 28, 1992	115,000	
24th	June 27, 1993	140,000	
25th	June 5, 1994	160,000	
26th	June 25, 1995	175,000	
27th	June 30, 1996	150,000	
28th	June 29, 1997	200,000	
29th	June 28, 1998	200,000+	
30th	June 27, 1999	250,000	
31st	June 25, 2000	350,000	
32nd	June 24, 2001	350,000	
33rd	June 30, 2002	350,000	
34th	June 29, 2003	375,000	
35th	June 27, 2004	375,000	
36th	June 26, 2005	450,000	
37th	June 25, 2006	400,000	
38th	June 24, 2007	450,000	
39th	June 29, 2008	450,000	
40th	June 28, 2009	500,000	
41st	June 27, 2010	450,000	
42nd	June 26, 2011	750,000	
43rd	June 24, 2012	850,000	
44th	June 30, 2013	1,000,000	
45th	June 29, 2014	1,000,000+	
46th	June 28, 2015	1,000,000+	
47th	June 26, 2016	1,000,000+	
48th	June 25, 2017	1,000,000+	
49th	June 24, 2018	1,000,000+	
50th	June 30, 2019	1,000,000+	
51st	June 28, 2020	Cancelled due to COVID-19 pandemic	
51st	October 3, 2021	Cancelled due to COVID-19 pandemic	
51st	June 26, 2022	1,000,000+	
52nd	June 25, 2023	1,000,000+	
53rd	June 30, 2024	1,000,000+	

== Grand Marshals ==
Chicago Pride Parade Grand Marshals and Theme
Edition	Date	Grand Marshal	Theme	Ref(s).
35th	June 27, 2004	Esera Tuaolo	-	
53rd	June 30, 2024	Fortune Feimster	Pride is Power	

== See also ==
- LGBT culture in Chicago
- Pride Parade
