= AIDS Garden Chicago =

Parks in Chicago

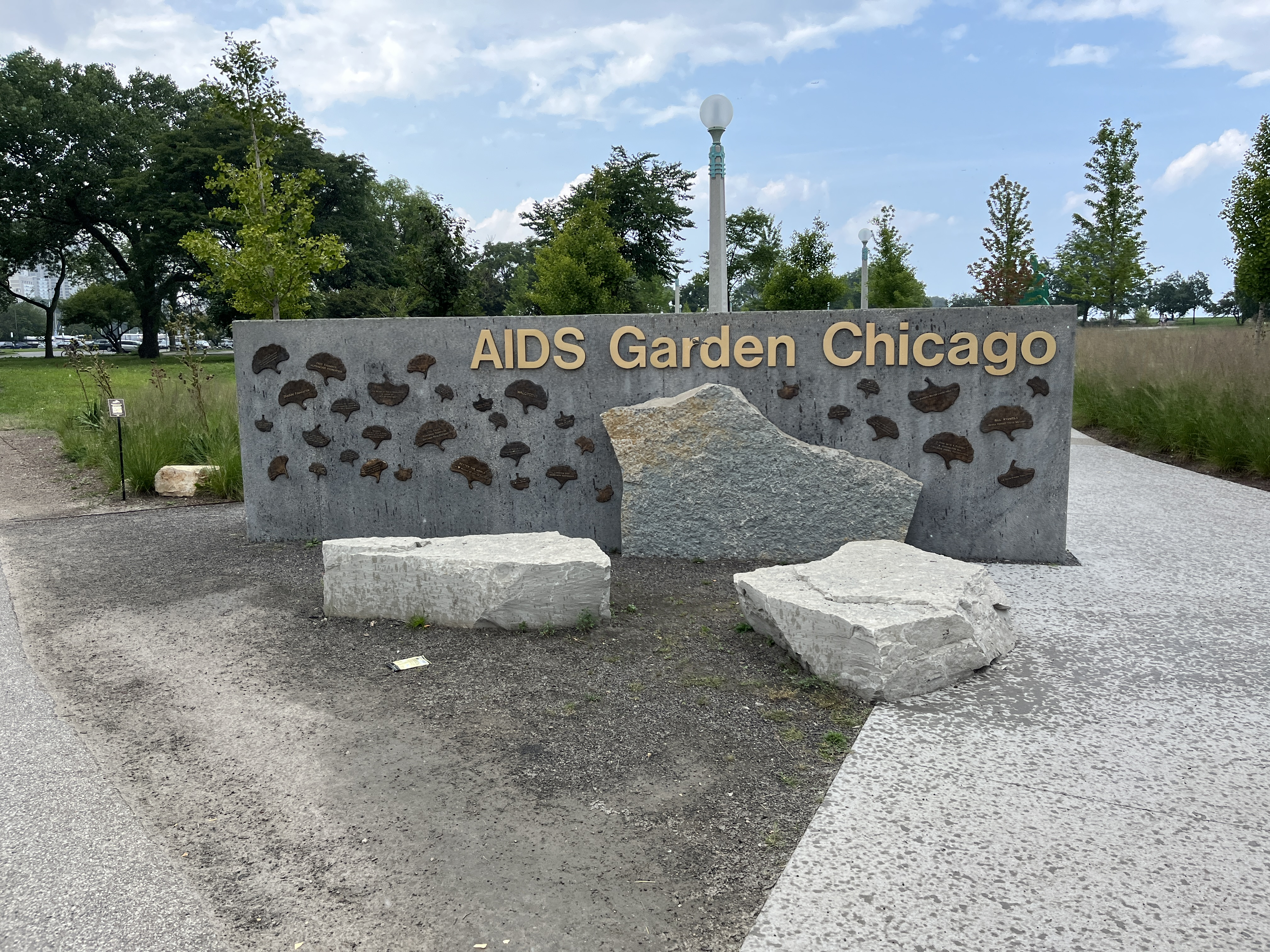
- AIDS Garden Chicago
- Interactive map of AIDS Garden Chicago
- Type: Urban park
- Location: Chicago, Illinois
- Coordinates: 41°56′20″N 87°38′05″W
- Area: 2.5 acres (1.0 ha)
- Elevation: 587 feet (179 m)

AIDS Garden Chicago is a public 2.5 acre garden along Lake Michigan in Chicago's Lincoln Park. It serves to memorialize the HIV epidemic in Chicago and honor those who live with the disease today, and is managed alongside the Chicago Park District.

== History ==
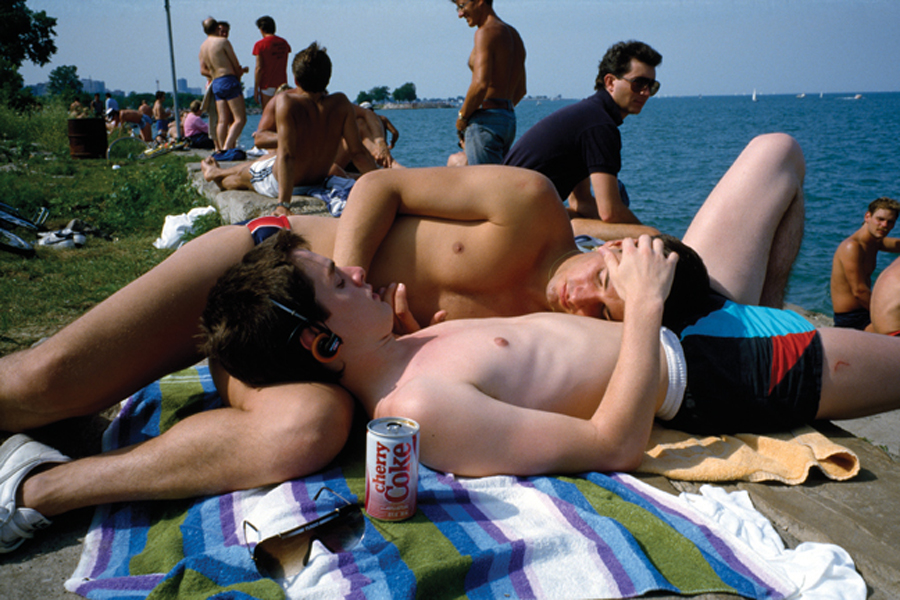
Photo captured in 1985 of Belmont Rocks, as part of photographer Doug Ischar's Marginal Waters

=== Belmont Rocks ===
Prior to 2003, the now-site of the AIDS Garden was an outcrop of tiered limestone slabs which was used as a shoreline and sunbathing area. From the late 1960s to the 1990s, Belmont Rocks was an informal gathering space for the LGBT community in Chicago, and was known as a hotspot of cruising activity. In 1985, the Rocks were the subject of gay artist Doug Ischar's photography series Marginal Waters, which aimed to capture the gay social scene in a documentarian style. During the HIV/AIDS crisis of the 1980s, the Rocks also served as a memorial space for LGBT Chicagoans who died from the disease.

The Rocks were removed in 2003 and replaced with a concrete retaining wall as part of a shoreline revetment project. After the site was demolished, plans were made to transform the space into a garden; however, the 2008 financial crisis led to the cancellation of the initial project.

=== AIDS Garden Chicago ===
Plans for AIDS Garden Chicago were relaunched in 2018, and the park's anchor piece, a 30-foot tall Keith Haring sculpture titled 'Self-Portrait', was installed in late 2019. Although it was originally set to be complete in 2020, the COVID-19 pandemic shifted state funding away from the project, and it was delayed for a year. In June 2021, a groundbreaking ceremony was officially held at the site of the Belmont rocks. The park officially opened on June 2, 2022, and includes spaces for art installations, an educational walk which includes QR codes with information on how HIV has impacted the LGBT community in Chicago, a grove of gingko trees, and a perennial garden.
