= Minibar (Chicago) =

Defunct gay bar in Chicago, Illinois, U.S.

Coordinates: 41°56′34.7″N 87°38′57.2″W

- Interactive map of Minibar
- Address: 3341 N. Halsted; Chicago, Illinois; United States
- Operator: John Dalton and Stu Zirin
- Event: Gay bar

Construction
- Opened: 2005
- Closed: 2016

Minibar was a gay bar in Chicago, Illinois, in the United States, previously located at 3341 N. Halsted. It was opened in 2005 by John Dalton and Stu Zirin and closed in 2016.

== Reception ==
In 2013, Out included Minibar in their list of the "200 of the Greatest Gay Bars in the World". The magazine said of the bar, "Attentive and, more importantly, hot model-esque guys serve your every whim—from delicious cotton candy martinis to paninis. In the heart of the gay filled Halsted Street, walk upstairs and tilt your head back for a stunning light show in this attractive, modern lounge."
