= Chicago Is a Drag Festival =

Drag festival in Chicago, Illinois, U.S.

- Genre: Drag festival
- Frequency: Annually
- Locations: 5238 N. Clark St, Chicago, Illinois
- Coordinates: 41°58′38.99″N 87°40′8.36″W
- Country: USA
- Inaugurated: June 28, 2019

The Chicago Is a Drag Festival is an annual drag festival in Chicago, Illinois, United States. It is the first drag-centered festival in the Midwest. The festival showcases drag acts from all different genres, including drag kings, pageant queens, comedy and camp, performers who dance and lip sync, and emcees. Organizers purposely booked a diverse lineup including people of color, trans and nonbinary people, and a mix of longtime performers and newcomers.

== Performers ==
=== 2019 ===
The first festival was held in June 2019, which coincided with the 50th anniversary of the Stonewall riot and the 50th anniversary of the Baton Show Lounge. The first event showcased 50 performers including: Imp Queen, Lucky Stiff, and Elektra Del Rio. Emcees included Lucy Stoole, Aunty Chan, Khloe Park and DiDa Ritz of RuPaul’s Drag Race. Special guests included Tiffany “New York” Pollard and TS Madison, along with Candis Cayne and Drag Race winner Raja.

=== 2020 ===
During the COVID-19 pandemic, the event was hosted online. The festival streamed on A Queer Pride's Twitch channel on June 30, 2020. It was hosted by Shea Couleé. Performers included: Lucy Stoole, Tenderoni and Bambi Banks-Couleé, The Vixen, Detox, DiDa Ritz, and Joan Jett Blakk. Musicians Peaches and Nadya Tolokno of Pussy Riot made guest appearances.

=== 2022 ===
On June 24, 2022, the event was held at the Cheetah Gym lot in Andersonville. The third festival showcased 40 performers, including: Denali, Kahmora Hall, Fantasia Gaga Royale (the first winner of the OUTtv show HotHaus). Hosts included Precious Brady-Davis.

=== 2023 ===
The 2023 festival was titled Chicago Is a Dollhouse. 35 other trans and non-binary performers were showcased on June 23, 2023. For the first time, the festival was free. It was held at the Cheetah Gym Parking Lot on 5248 N. Clark St in Andersonville.

It was hosted by Angelíca Grace, Chanel Mercedes Benz, Danika Blake, Dutchesz Gemini, Irregular Girl, Luv Ami-Stoole, Switch The Boi, and TiKi Vonté. Featured performers were Jazell Barbie Royale, of Queen Of The Universe, and Vander Von Odd, winner of Boulet Brothers’ Dragula Season 1.

Performers included: Alexandrea Diamond, Ashaandti, Aurora Gozmic, Boo Boo Kitty Fuck, Bubba Boom, Christi DaVinci, Clit Hardwood, Cosmo Dragón Fiero, Cunty MeMe, Denime Infiniti Sanchez, Dida Ritz, Doja Thee Kiki, Dusty Bahls, Helvetikah Blak, JForPay, Joan Jullian, Kenzie Couleé, Lila Star, Lilith Babylon, Liviana, Lucy Stoole, Lynzo The Heartthrob, Mick Douch, Omani Cross, pb, Penis Envy, Rachel Slurrz-Stoole, Ramona Slick, Sasha Sota, Selena Rivera, Smokey Karmichael, Travis Fiero, Yuíza Beach, Ziggy Banks.
