= Pink triangle =

Symbol for the LGBTQIA+ community

A pink triangle in the original Nazi orientation

A pink triangle is a symbol for the LGBTQ+ community. Initially intended as a badge of shame, it was later reappropriated as a positive symbol of self-identity. It originated in Nazi Germany in the 1930s and 1940s as one of the Nazi concentration camp badges, distinguishing those imprisoned because they had been identified by authorities as gay men and/or crossdressers. In the 1970s, it was revived as a symbol of protest against homophobia, and has since been adopted by the larger LGBT community as a popular symbol of LGBTQ+ pride and the LGBTQ+ movements and queer liberation movements.

== History ==
=== Nazi prisoner identification ===
In Nazi concentration camps, each prisoner was required to wear a downward-pointing, equilateral triangular cloth badge on their chest, the color of which identified the stated reason for their imprisonment. Early on, prisoners perceived as gay men were variously identified with a green triangle (indicating criminals) or red triangle (political prisoners), the number 175 (referring to Paragraph 175, the section of the German penal code criminalizing homosexual activity), or the letter A (which stood for Arschficker, literally "arse fucker").

Later, the use of a pink triangle was established for prisoners identified as homosexual. (While Lesbian and bisexual women were not systematically imprisoned, some were classified as "asocial" because of their sexuality and sent to concentration camps, wearing a black triangle.) If a prisoner was in addition identified as Jewish, the triangle was superimposed over a second yellow triangle pointing the opposite way, to resemble the Star of David like the yellow badge identifying other Jews. Prisoners wearing a pink triangle were harshly treated by most other prisoners.

After the camps were liberated at the end of the Second World War, some of the prisoners imprisoned for homosexuality were re-incarcerated by the Allied-established Federal Republic of Germany, as the Nazi laws against homosexuality were not repealed there until 1969. The Nazi amendments to Paragraph 175 remained intact in East Germany until 1968. In 2002 the German government issued official pardons to gay men who were convicted by the Nazis.

Rudolf Brazda, one of the last known homosexual concentration camp survivors, died on August 3, 2011, at the age of 98.

=== Symbols of LGBTQ+ liberation ===
In the 1970s, newly active Australian, European and North American queer liberation advocates began to use the pink triangle to raise awareness of its use in Nazi Germany. In 1972, gay concentration camp survivor Heinz Heger's memoir Die Männer mit dem rosa Winkel (The Men with the Pink Triangle) brought it to greater public attention. In response, the German gay liberation group Homosexuelle Aktion Westberlin issued a call in 1973 for gay men to wear it as a memorial to past victims and to protest continuing discrimination. In the 1975 movie The Rocky Horror Picture Show, Dr. Frank N. Furter—a bisexual transvestite—wears a pink triangle badge on one of his outfits. In 1976, Peter Recht, Detlef Stoffel, and Christiane Schmerl made the German documentary Rosa Winkel? Das ist doch schon lange vorbei... (Pink Triangle? That was such a long time ago...). Publications such as San Francisco's Gay Sunshine and Toronto's The Body Politic promoted the pink triangle as a memorial to those who had faced persecution and oppression.

In the 1980s, the pink triangle was increasingly used not just as a memorial but as a positive symbol of both self-identity and community identity. It commonly represented both gay and lesbian identity, and was incorporated into the logos of such organizations and businesses. It was also used by individuals, sometimes discreetly or ambiguously as an "insider" code unfamiliar to the heterosexual majority. The logo for the 1987 March on Washington for Lesbian and Gay Rights was a silhouette of the US Capitol Dome superimposed over a pink triangle. Additionally, the first South Asian LGBTQ+ identity-based group used the pink triangle for its logo in 1986: the inverted triangle of Trikone’s logo also roughly traces the shape of the Indian subcontinent, a signifier of their identity-based membership.

The design of the biangles symbol of bisexuality began with the pink triangle. The biangles symbol was designed by artist Liz Nania as she co-organized a bisexual contingent for the Second National March on Washington for Lesbian and Gay Rights in 1987. The addition of a blue triangle to the pink triangle in the biangles symbol contrasts the pink and represents heterosexuality. The two triangles overlap and form lavender, which represents the "queerness of bisexuality", referencing the Lavender Menace and 1980s and 1990s associations of lavender with queerness.

Taking a more militant tone, the AIDS Coalition to Unleash Power (ACT UP) was formed by six gay activists in New York City in 1987, and to draw attention to the disease's disproportionate impact on gay and bisexual men, and the apparent role of "genocidal" queer-antagonism in slowing progress on medical research, adopted an upward-pointing pink triangle on a black field along with the slogan "SILENCE = DEATH" as its logo. Some use the triangle in this orientation as a specific "reversal" of its usage by the Nazis. The Pink Panthers Movement in Denver, Colorado, adopted a pink triangle with clawed panther print logo, adapted from the original Pink Panthers Patrol in New York City.

In the 1990s, a pink triangle enclosed in a green circle came to be commonly used as a symbol identifying "safe spaces" for LGBTQ+ people at work or in school.

A pink Union Jack, with the blue triangles of the Union Jack changed to pink in reference to the pink triangle symbol, was created by a gay man, David Gwinnutt, to express his "pride in being gay and British."

Use of the pink triangle symbol is not without criticism. In 1993, historian Klaus Müller argued that "the pink triangles of the concentration camps became an international symbol of gay and lesbian pride because so few of us are haunted by concrete memories of those who were forced to wear them." In March 2025, US president Donald Trump shared a link to The Washington Times, which showed the downward pointed pink triangle overlaid with a no symbol, in reference to Trump's anti-DEI policies.

Symbols of LGBTQ+ liberation

The biangles symbol of bisexuality, designed by artist Liz Nania, features a pink triangle.

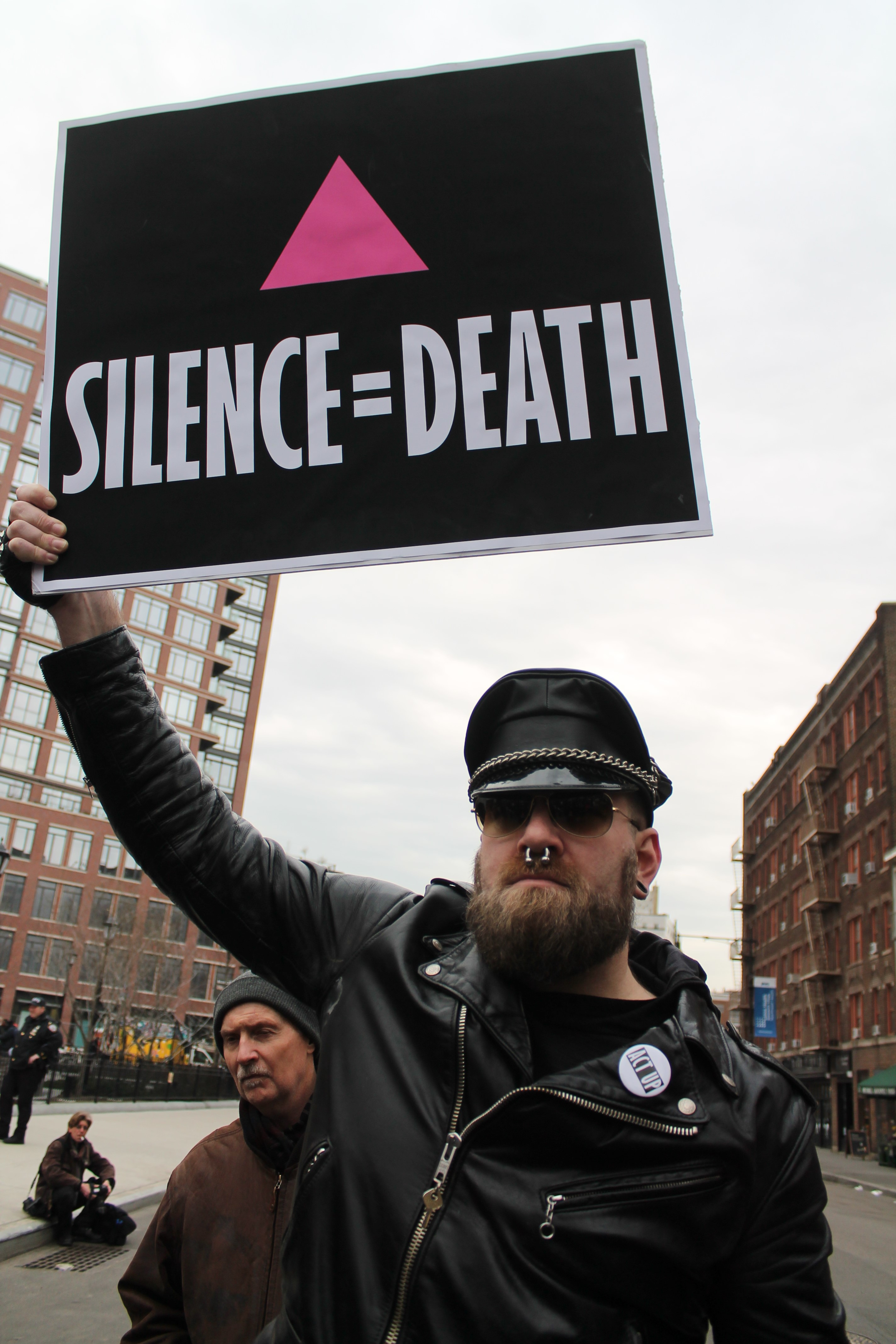
An ACT UP member in 2017, displaying the organization's trademark protest sign with an inverted, upward-pointing pink triangle.

An inverted pink triangle surrounded by a green circle, as used as a "safe space" symbol.

A pink Union Jack, a pride symbol with the blue triangles of the Union Jack changed to pink in reference to the pink triangle symbol.

== Memorials ==
The symbol of the pink triangle has been included in numerous public monuments and memorials. In 1980 a jury chose the pink triangle design for the Homomonument in Amsterdam, to memorialize gay and bisexual men killed in the Holocaust (and also victims of anti-gay violence generally). In 1995, after a decade of campaigning for it, a pink triangle plaque was installed at the Dachau Memorial Museum to commemorate the suffering of gay men and lesbians. In 2015 a pink triangle was incorporated into Chicago's Legacy Walk. It is the basis of the design of the Gay and Lesbian Holocaust Memorial in Sydney. It inspiried both San Francisco's Pink Triangle Park in the Castro and the 1-acre (4,000 m^{2}) Twin Peaks Pink Triangle displayed every year during Pride month. It is also the basis for LGBTQ+ memorials in Barcelona, Sitges, and Montevideo, and the burial component of the LGBTQ+ Pink Dolphin Monument in Galveston.

Examples of Pink Triangle memorials

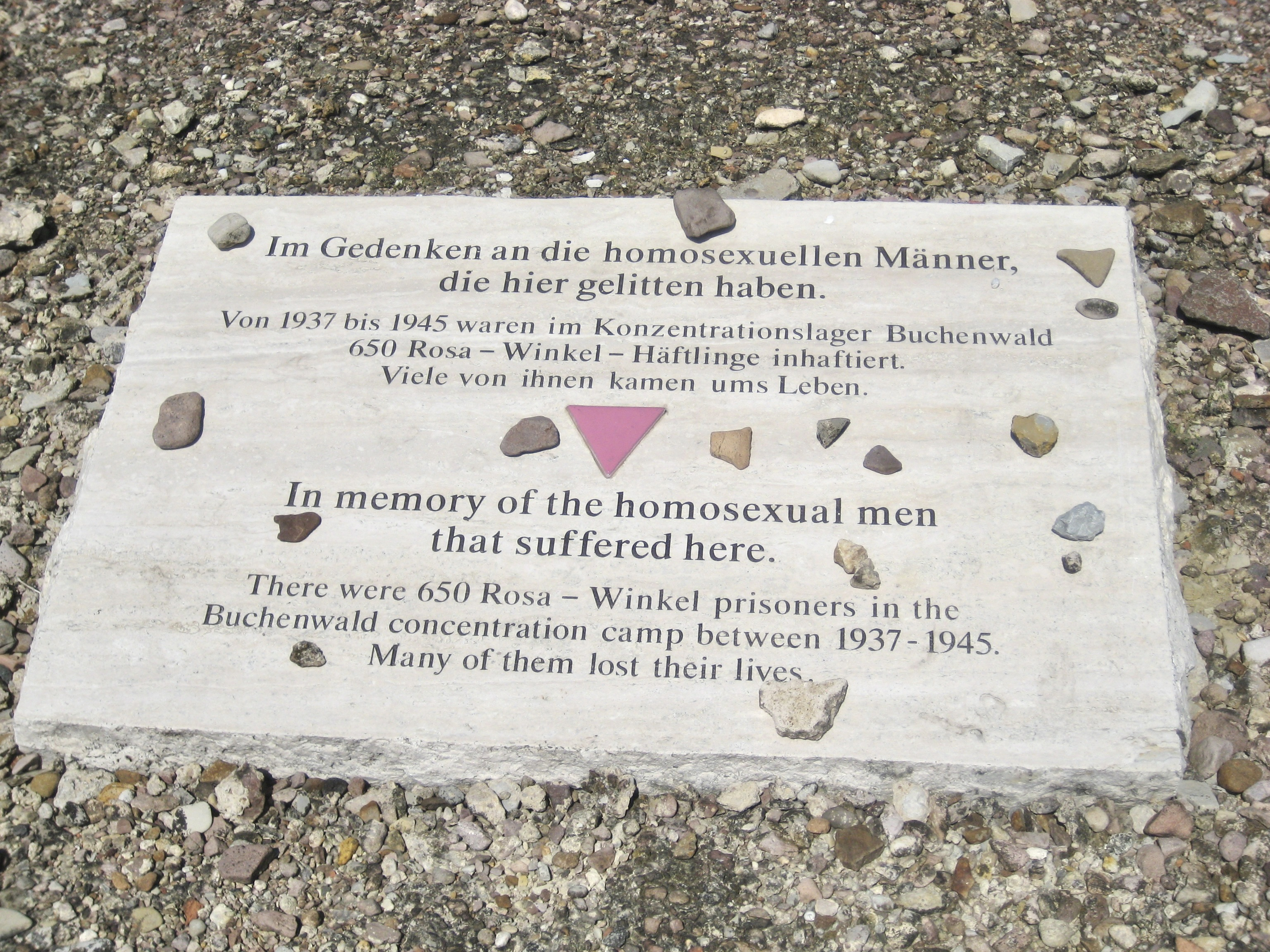
Pink triangle (Rosa Winkel in German) memorial for gay men killed at Buchenwald.

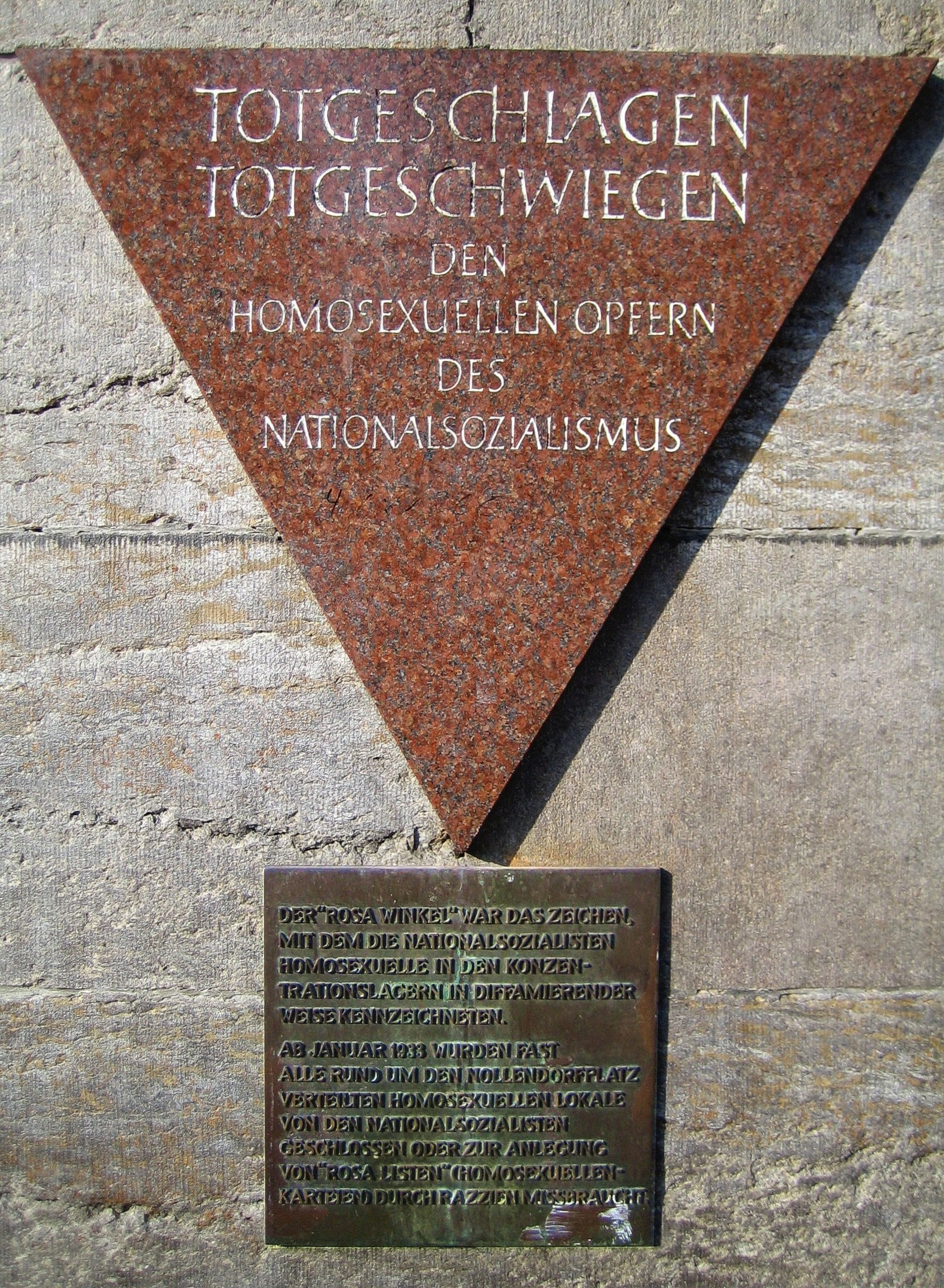
In the Berlin Nollendorfplatz subway station, a pink triangle plaque honors gay male victims.

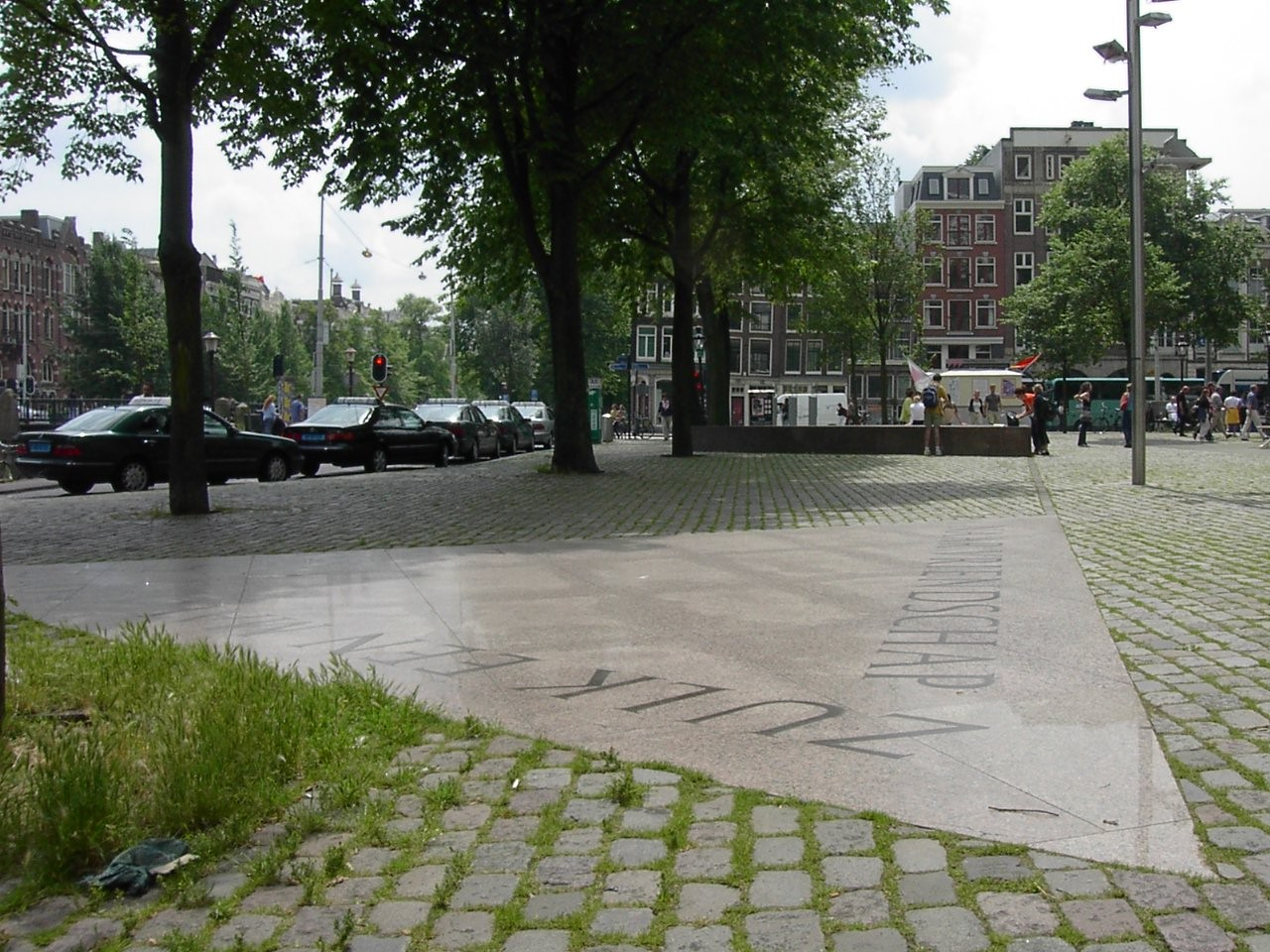
Amsterdam's Homomonument uses pink triangles symbolically to memorialize gay men killed in the Holocaust (and also victims of anti-gay violence generally).

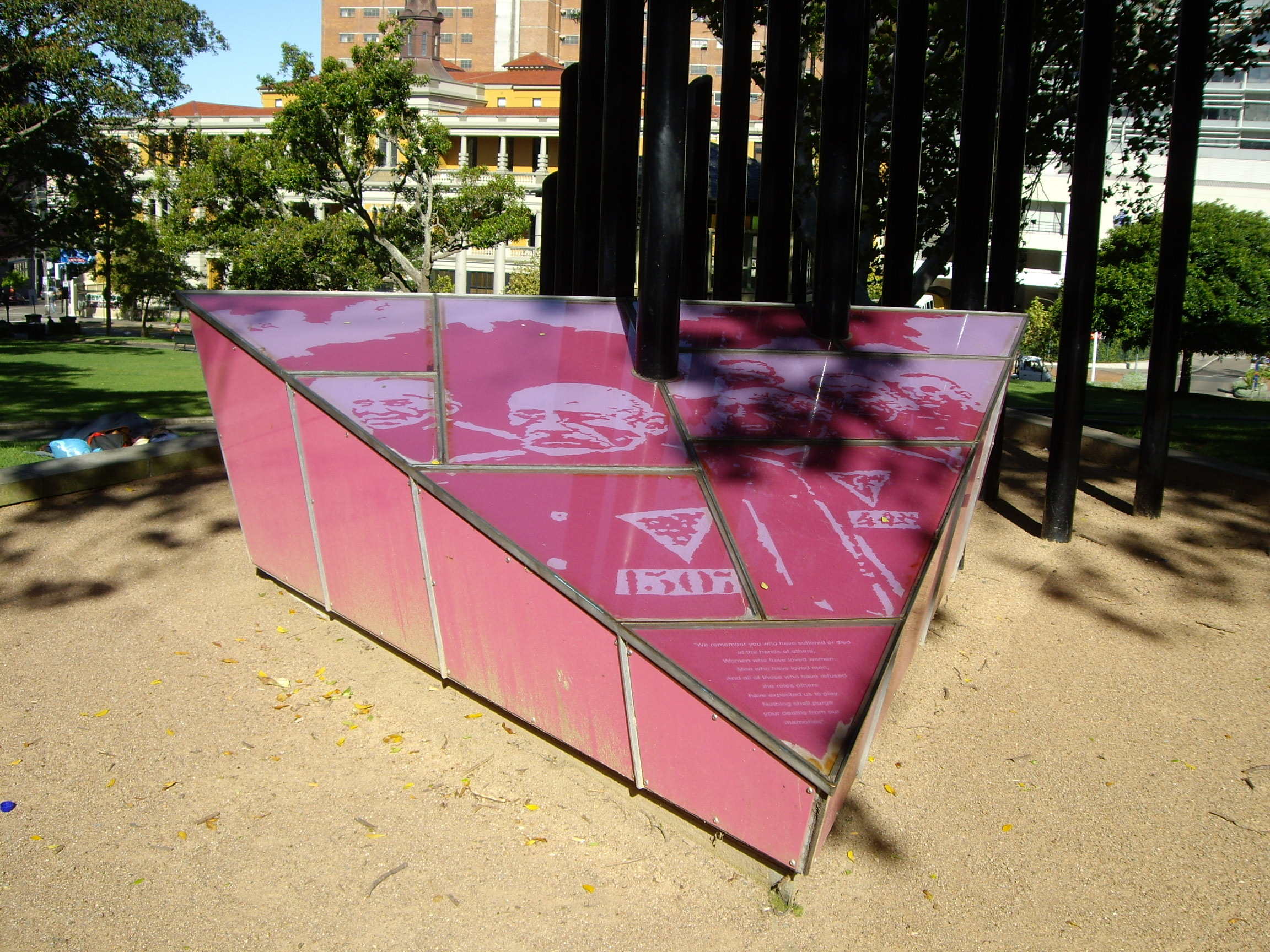
Sydney Gay and Lesbian Holocaust Memorial

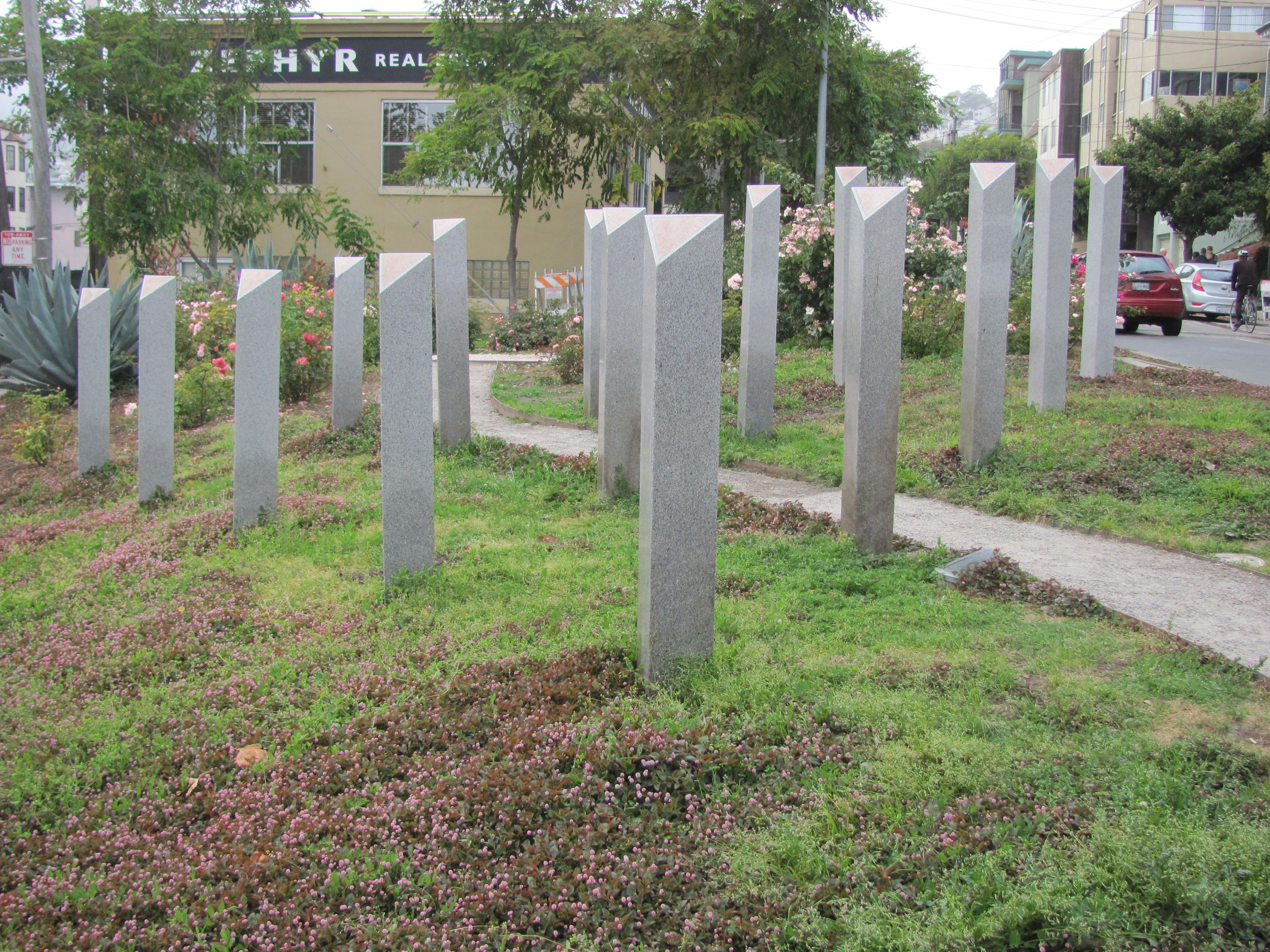
Pink Triangle Park in the Castro District of San Francisco honors gay holocaust victims

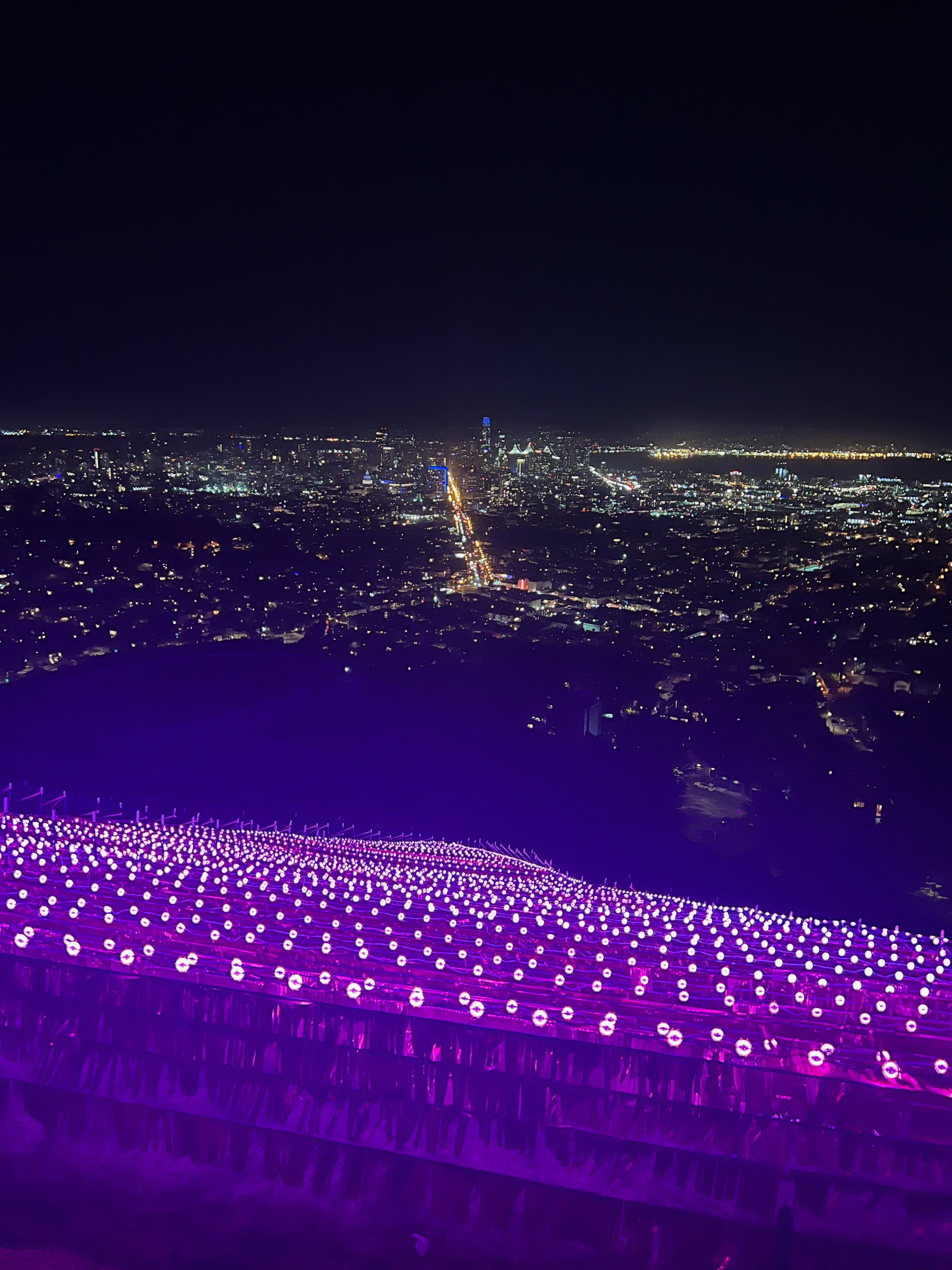
Pink Triangle 2022 installation on Twin Peaks in San Francisco

== See also ==
- Heinz Heger – Concentration camp survivor (1915–1994)
  - The Men With the Pink Triangle book by Heinz Heger
- LGBTQ slang – Slang used mostly among LGBTQ people
- LGBTQ symbols – Flags and symbols used by the LGBTQ community
- Reappropriation – Valuing a formerly pejorative term in esteem
- Persecution of homosexuals in Nazi Germany
  - Institut für Sexualwissenschaft – German sexology research institute (1919–33)
  - Röhm scandal – 1931–32 political scandal in Germany (Ernst Röhm)
- Silence=Death Project – Social project of the AIDS crisis
- Red triangle
  - Red triangle (badge)
  - Red triangle (family planning)
  - Red triangle (Palestinian symbol)
- Other Nazi concentration camp badge § Single triangles
  - Black triangle (badge) – Nazi concentration camp badge for "asocials"
  - Blue triangle – Cloth emblems; part of the system of identification in Nazi camps
  - Brown triangle – Genocide of the Romani in Europe during World War II
  - Green triangle – Cloth emblems; part of the system of identification in Nazi camps
  - P (Nazi symbol) – Sign for Polish workers during the NS-Regime in Nazi Germany
  - Yellow badge – Badge forced to be worn by Jews
