= Never Look Away =

Never Look Away may refer to:

- Never Look Away (2018 film), (Werk ohne Autor), a German drama film directed by Florian Henckel von Donnersmarck
- Never Look Away (2024 film), a New Zealand documentary film directed by Lucy Lawless
- Never Look Away (mural), a public mural in Portland, Oregon
