= Twin Peaks Pink Triangle =

LGBTQ art installation in San Francisco

Coordinates: 37°45′17.4″N 122°26′46.2″W

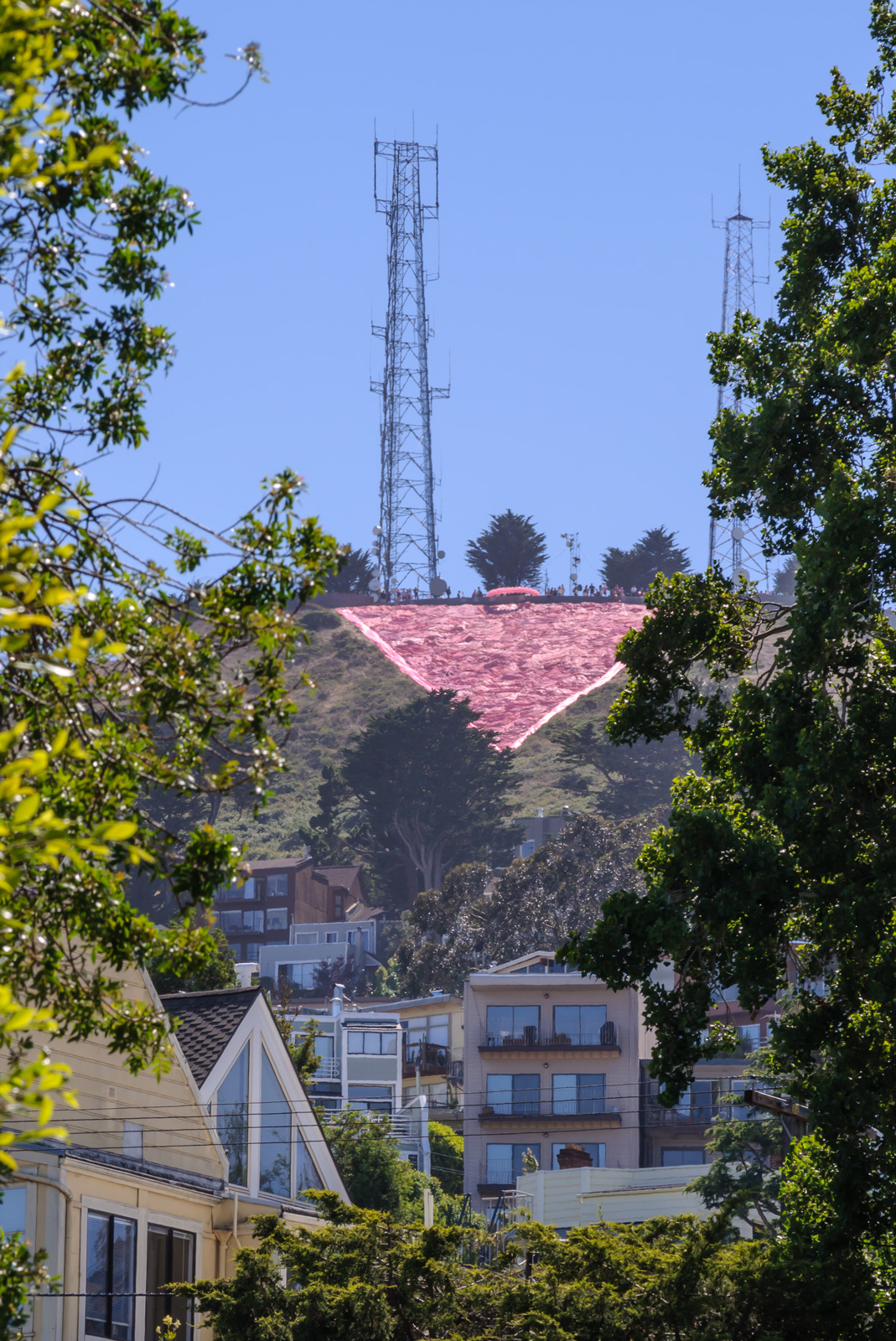
The Pink Triangle viewed from the Castro District.

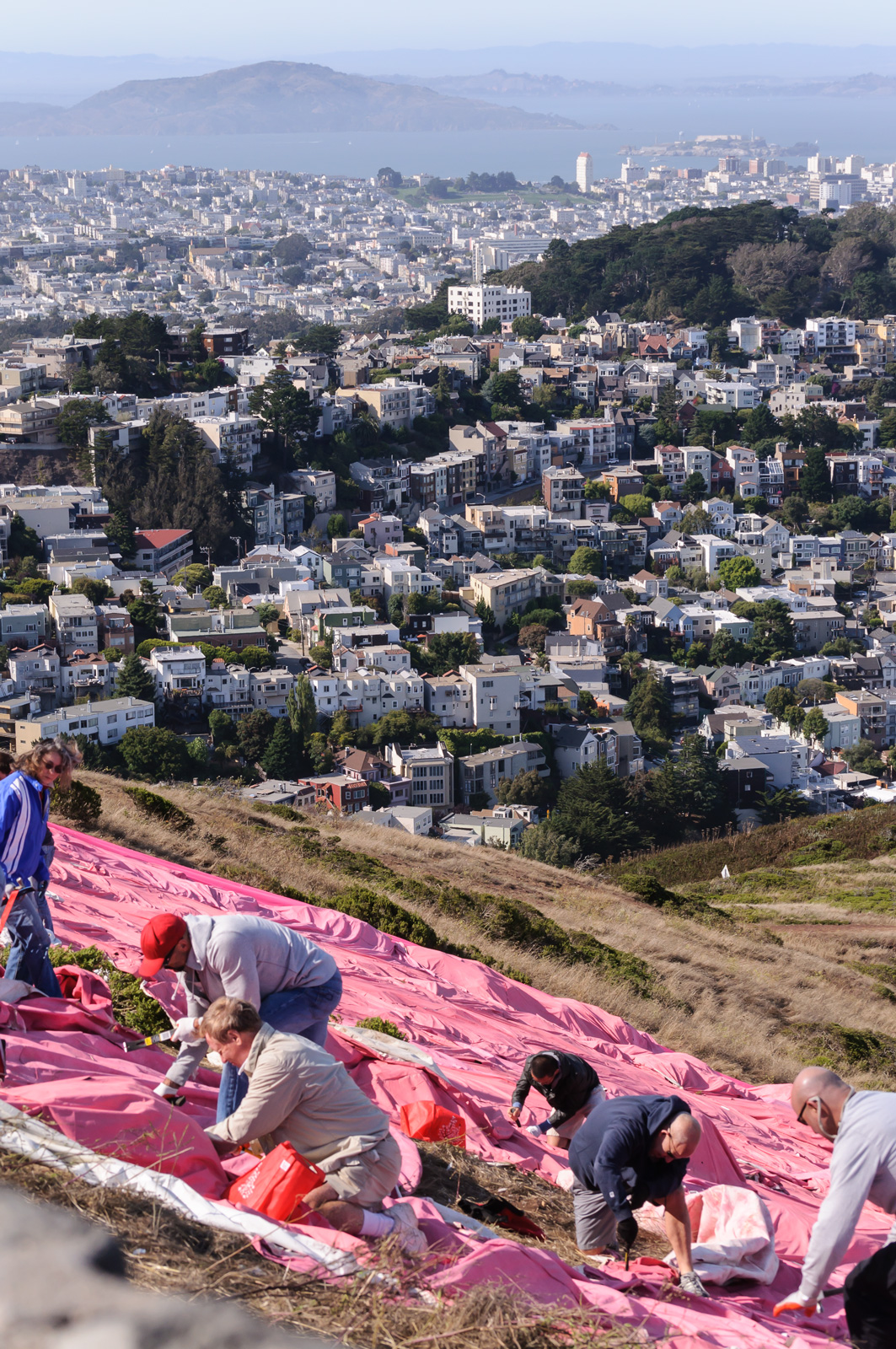
Volunteers installing the Pink Triangle in 2013.

The Twin Peaks Pink Triangle is a seasonal public art installation displayed annually on Twin Peaks, San Francisco during Pride Month. First assembled in 1995, the pink triangle symbol commemorates LGBTQ victims of the Holocaust. The installation is regarded as one of San Francisco's most famous and iconic LGBTQ symbols.

== History ==
The Pink Triangle was founded by Patrick Carney, a San Francisco architect who wanted a visible symbol of Pride Month. He chose the pink triangle rather than a rainbow flag, as Carney felt the rainbow flag was already common in the city, and many of his friends were unaware of the Holocaust origin of the triangle. The first installation in 1995 was done at night without permission from the city. Since its first year, the triangle has expanded in size multiple times, eventually covering over an acre. The triangle was most recently expanded in 2023, which organizers stated was to take a symbolic stand against recent legislation such as the Florida Parental Rights in Education Act (commonly called the "Don't Say Gay" law).

In 2020, the usual pink sailcloth was replaced by a display of 2700 pink LED lights installed by nonprofit organization Illuminate.

In 2025, the Pink Triangle was vandalized, with 26 sections of tarp defaced with black spray paint. A 19-year-old man was later arrested, and the vandalism was condemned by San Francisco mayor Daniel Lurie and state senator Scott Wiener.

== See also ==
- List of LGBT monuments and memorials
