= Plaza de la Diversidad Sexual =

Plaza commemorating LGBTQ+ activism

Coordinates: 34.9060°S 56.2018°W

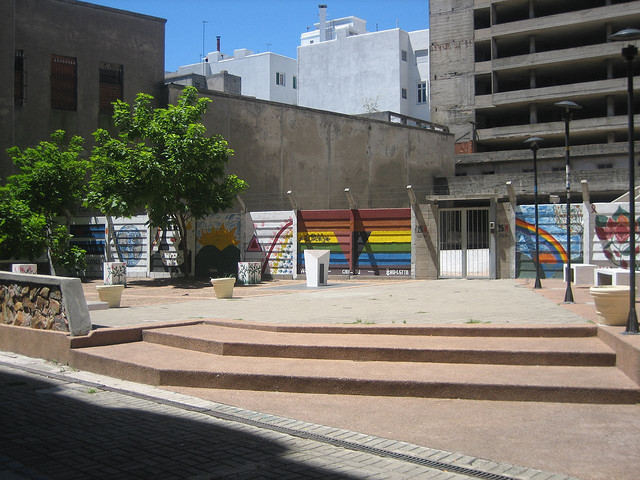
Plaza de la diversidad sexual in Montevideo.

The Plaza de la Diversidad Sexual (Plaza of Sexual Diversity) is located in the Old City neighborhood of Montevideo, Uruguay. The plaza includes a large triangular granite monolith -- a reference to the pink triangles worn during the Nazi persecution of LGBT people.

== History ==
Eight activist groups worked together to propose the creation of this plaza: Grupo Diversidad, Grupo LGTTBI, Amnesty International Uruguay, LGTTBI Library, Uruguayan Center for Interdisciplinary Research and Study in Sexuality (CIEI-SU), the Sisters of Perpetual Indulgence, Encuentro Ecuménico por la Liberación de las Minorías Sexuales, and the Association of Uruguayan Lesbians. The proposal received the unanimous support of the Montevideo legislature.

Mariano Arana dedicated the monument on February 2, 2004.

== Monolith ==
The monolith features the following inscription: "Honrar la diversidad es honrar la vida: Montevideo por el respeto a todo género, identidad y orientación sexual" (Honoring diversity is honoring life: Montevideo for the respect of every gender, identity, and sexual orientation).

== Exhibitions ==
In 2023, researchers Diego Sempol and Aldo Garay presented the outdoor exhibition La vida de Gloria Meneses. Memoria histórica y silencios (The Life of Gloria Meneses. Historical memory and silences) which brings together photographs of travesti and LGBT rights activist Gloria Meneses' life.

== See also ==
- List of LGBT monuments and memorials
