= Pink dolphin =

Pink dolphin may refer to:

- Amazon river dolphin (Inia geoffrensis), live in the river systems of Brazil, Bolivia, Peru, Ecuador, Colombia and Venezuela
- Chinese white dolphin (Sousa chinensis chinensis), of The River Delta that also occur in Southeast Asia and breed from South Africa to Australia
- Pink Dolphin Monument on Galveston Island, Texas
