= An Opened Letter =

2025 British memorial to LGBTQ military personnel

- United Kingdom
- For LGBTQ veterans banned from service
- Dedicated: 27 October 2025
- Location: 52.7280147°N 1.7308925°W; National Memorial Arboretum, Staffordshire
- Designed by: Abraxas Academy (Charlotte Howarth, Nina Bilbey, Sue Aperghis, James Spedding, Kate Homes)

"An Opened Letter" is the first memorial for LGBTQ personnel in the British Armed Forces, located at the National Memorial Arboretum in Staffordshire, England. A result of the 2023 Etherton Review by Terence Etherton and a creation of the Abraxas Academy artist collective with leadership from charity Fighting With Pride, it commemorates those who were impacted by the ban on LGBTQ personnel in the British military that was in place from 1967 until 11 January 2000. Its dedication was attended by King Charles III, and was his first official engagement in support of the LGBTQ community.

The sculpture at the centre of the memorial is bronze and is in the form of a crumpled personal letter, which is composed of the words of military personnel in letters that were used to incriminate them under the ban. Reports have variously stated that the sculpture is intended to symbolise and represent the swearing of the Oath of Allegiance, the discarded evidence of mistreatment of LGBT personnel, correspondence used to incriminate service personnel under the ban, and letters from home while the personnel were on operation.

== Background ==
A ban on LGBTQ personnel in the British military was in place from 1967 until 11 January 2000. The outcomes of the ban included thousands of personnel being investigated, discharged or forced to leave their careers due to their actual or perceived sexual orientations or gender identities. The results of this included lifelong consequences such as vilification by family and friends and loss of access to military pensions.

In 2023 the Etherton Review, an independent review concerning LGBTQ people in the military, was published by former judge Terence Etherton who had served in the military. It set out 49 recommendations including financial reparations as well as a public memorial. This prompted then-Prime Minister Rishi Sunak to apologise on behalf of the British state for the historical treatment of LGBTQ military personnel, which he referred to as "horrific". In December 2023, it was announced that veterans who suffered mistreatment under the ban would receive up to £70,000 each, those who were dismissed or discharged due to their sexual orientation or gender identity were to receive £50,000, and those who were "negatively affected" by the ban were to be given another £20,000.

== History ==
The LGBTQ military charity Fighting With Pride led the project behind the memorial, with support from the Royal British Legion. The Office for Veterans' Affairs at the Ministry of Defence gave out a £350,000 grant to fund the memorial. In January 2025, out of a choice of 38 entries, a specialist panel chose the design by the collective of artists based in Norfolk and Suffolk known as the Abraxas Academy, a collective which consisted of lead artist Nina Bilbey as well as artists Charlotte Howarth from Norfolk, Sue Aperghis from Felixstowe in Suffolk, James Spedding of Holkham Forge, and Kate Homes. The group had met with individuals impacted by the LGBTQ military ban during the process of planning the memorial. Its initial title, as reported that month, was Crumpled Letter. The metalwork for the memorial was to be made in Holkham Forge, and the stonework was to be designed and hand-cut in West Acre, Norfolk. Upon its construction, the memorial was expected to fulfil three of the 49 recommendations in the Etherton Review.

=== Dedication ===
The dedication of "An Opened Letter", on 27 October 2025, was Charles' first official engagement in support of the LGBTQ community. It was attended by 300 guests including serving and former members of the armed forces, some of whom had had their military careers ended or cut short by the ban prior to its lifting in 2000. These included Carol Morgan who had joined the military in the 1970s and was then thrown out under the ban after four years of service after having her room ransacked, being interviewed for six and a half hours, and being sent to a psychiatrist as her sexuality had been seen as a mental illness. Other former military personnel that attended included Claire Ashton who was discharged from the Royal Artillery in 1972, Sharon Pickering who was dismissed from the Royal Navy in 1991, Kevin Bazeley who was dismissed from the Royal Air Force (RAF) in 1995, and Carl Austin-Behan who was also dismissed from the RAF in 1997. MP and minister for veterans and people Louise Sandher-Jones also attended. Brigadier Clare Phillips spoke at the dedication and said that the memorial was "about remembering that we stand on the shoulders of giants – those people who fought discrimination and persecution so we can now serve openly and proudly. It is about being able to say to our veterans: you belong and you always did." Charles laid flowers, as did other guests including Air Chief Marshal Sir Rich Knighton.

Prime Minister Keir Starmer stated that the memorial "stands as a lasting tribute to the bravery and service of these veterans." Fighting With Pride called it a "powerful step forward in recognising and honouring the service and sacrifices" of the LGBTQ armed forces community.

== See also ==
- List of LGBTQ monuments and memorials
