= Pink Triangle Park =

Park and memorial in San Francisco, California, US

Coordinates: 37°45′44″N 122°26′10″W

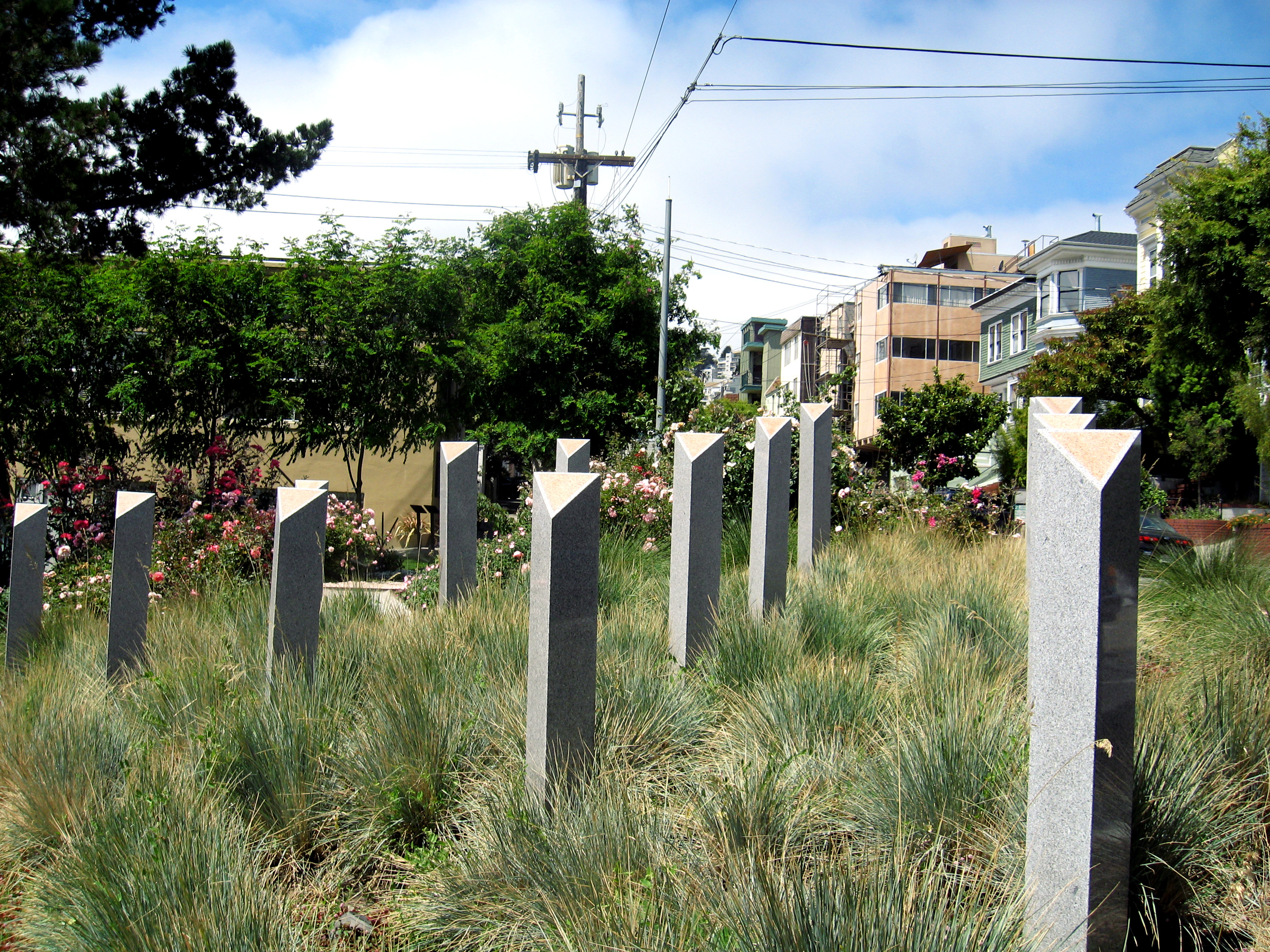
- Interactive map of Pink Triangle Park
- Location: Castro District, San Francisco, U.S.
- Open: 2003
- Website: pinktrianglememorial.org

Park layout

The Pink Triangle Park is a triangle-shaped mini-park located in the Castro District of San Francisco, California. The park is less than 4,000 square feet (370 m^{2}) and faces Market Street with 17th Street to its back. The park sits directly above the Castro Street Station of Muni Metro, across from Harvey Milk Plaza. It is the first permanent, free-standing memorial in America dedicated to the thousands of persecuted homosexuals in Nazi Germany during the Holocaust of World War II.

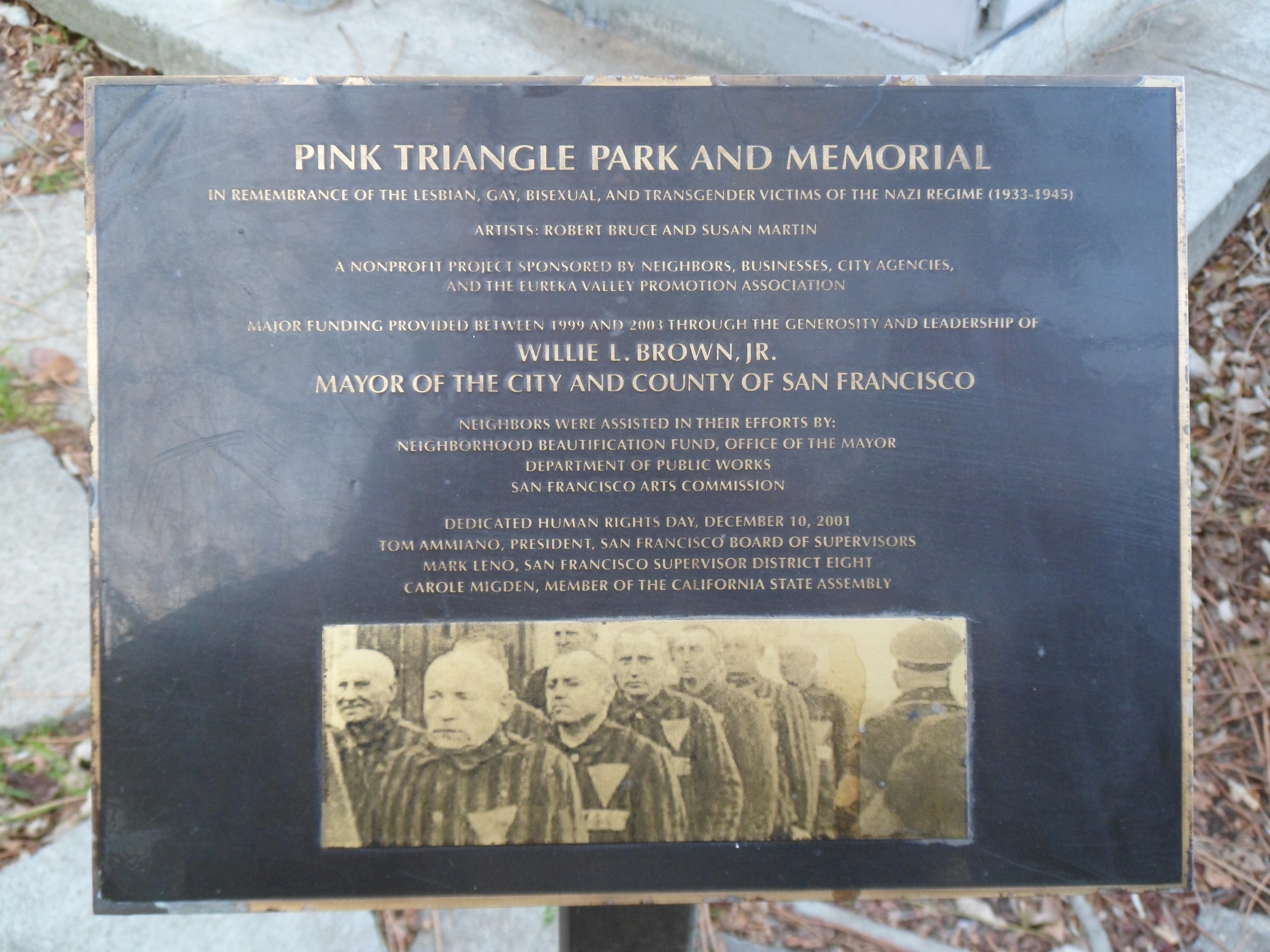
Information board

Fifteen triangular granite pylons, or columns, are dedicated to the thousands of homosexual, bisexual, and transgender victims that were killed during Hitler's Nazi regime. (Note: According to Gottfried Lorenz, assuming a death rate of between 53 and 60 percent, at least 3,100 to 3,600 men died in the Nazi concentration camps.) In the center of the park is a loose rock-filled triangle that includes rose crystals. Visitors are encouraged to take a crystal as part of the memorial experience. The triangle theme recalls the Nazis forcing homosexual men to wear pink triangles sewn to their clothes as an identifier and badge of shame. The Pink Triangle Park was dedicated on the United Nations Human Rights Day, December 10, 2001, by the Eureka Valley Promotion Association.

According to the non-profit that maintains the space, the Pink Triangle Park serves as "a physical reminder of how the persecution of any individual or single group of people damages all humanity." The Castro serves as an LGBT neighborhood for the San Francisco and Bay Areas communities, as well as a tourist destination for its part in modern LGBT history.

== See also ==
- List of Holocaust memorials and museums in the United States
- List of LGBT monuments and memorials
