= LGBT veterans monument (Chicago) =

Monument in Chicago, Illinois, U.S.

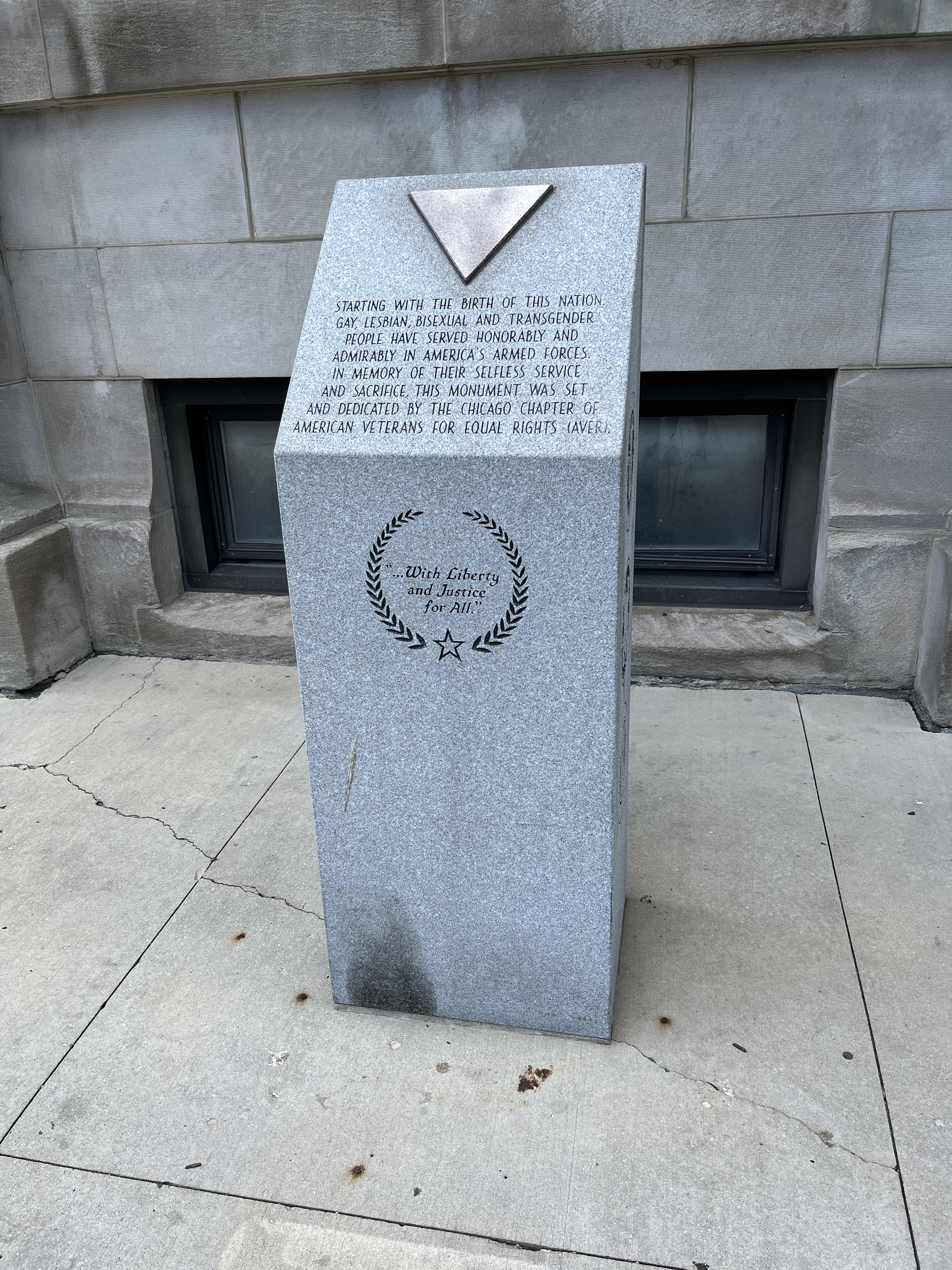
- The monument in 2023
- Interactive map of LGBT veterans monument
- Coordinates: 41°56′51″N 87°38′58.8″W

A monument commemorating LGBTQ veterans is installed in Boystown, Chicago, in the U.S. state of Illinois. The memorial was dedicated by the Chicago chapter of American Veterans for Equal Rights in 2017.

== See also ==
- List of LGBT monuments and memorials
