= List of LGBTQ monuments and memorials =

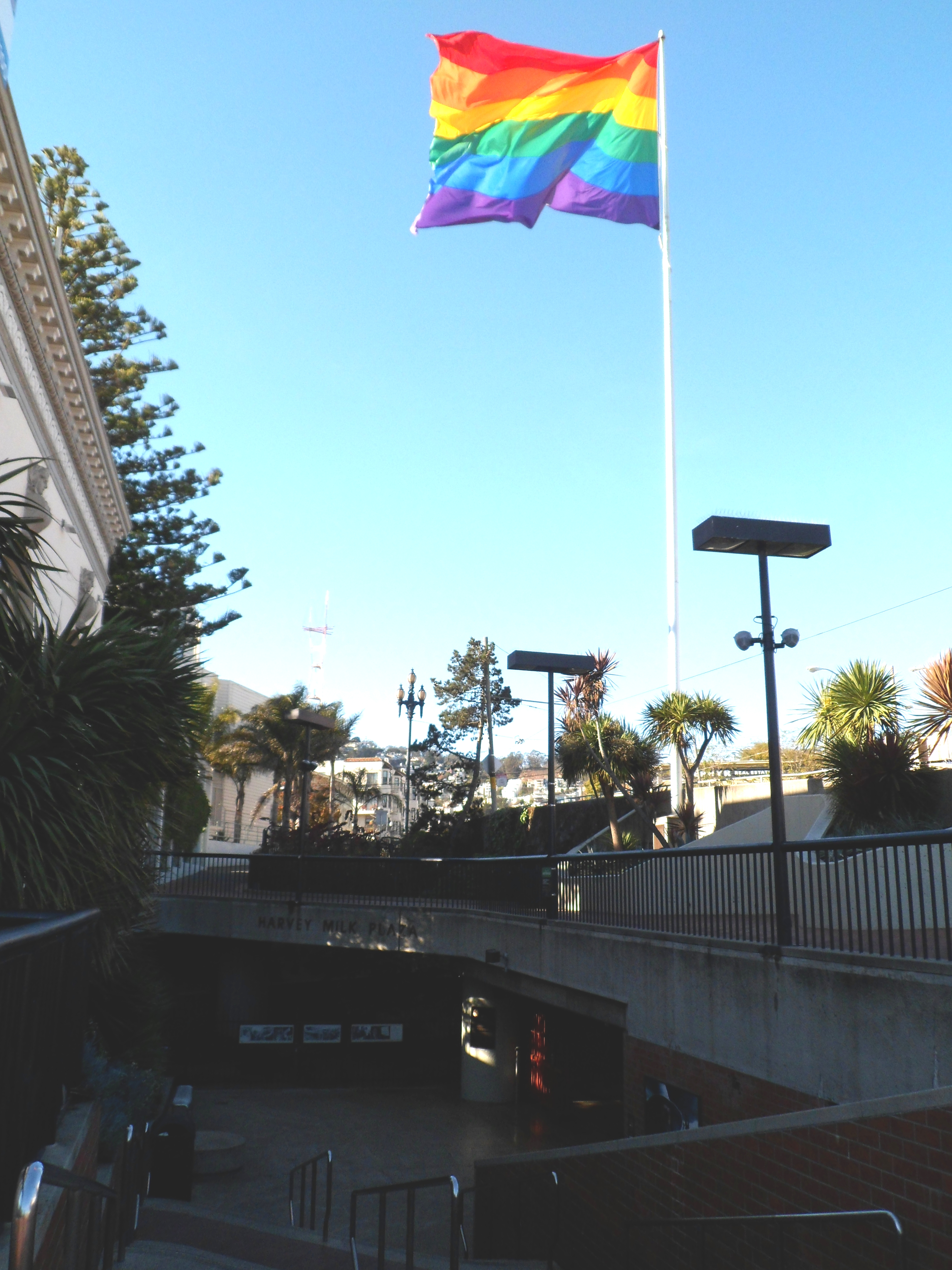
Harvey Milk Plaza, San Francisco

Following is a list of LGBTQ monuments and memorials:

== Americas ==
=== Brazil ===
- My Heart Beats Like Yours, Sculpture in Praça da República, 2018, São Paulo

=== Canada ===
- Cherry Trees at Devonian Harbour Park, Vancouver; planted in 1985 and solemnized in 2019 with a plaque acknowledging them as one of the earliest AIDS memorials in the world
- Jim Deva Plaza, Vancouver; launched in 2016
- LGBTQ2+ National Monument, Ottawa; in development and planned for unveiling in 2025
- Parc de l'Espoir, Montreal; commemorates community members who have died of HIV/AIDS
- Statue of Alexander Wood, Toronto; dedicated May 28, 2005, destroyed April 4, 2022
- Trans Memorial, Toronto, installed July 14, 2014
- Toronto AIDS Memorial, Toronto; launched in 1993
- Vancouver AIDS Memorial, Vancouver; launched in 2004

=== Chile ===
- Memorial por la Diversidad de Chile, in Santiago de Chile, 2014.

=== United States ===
==== California ====
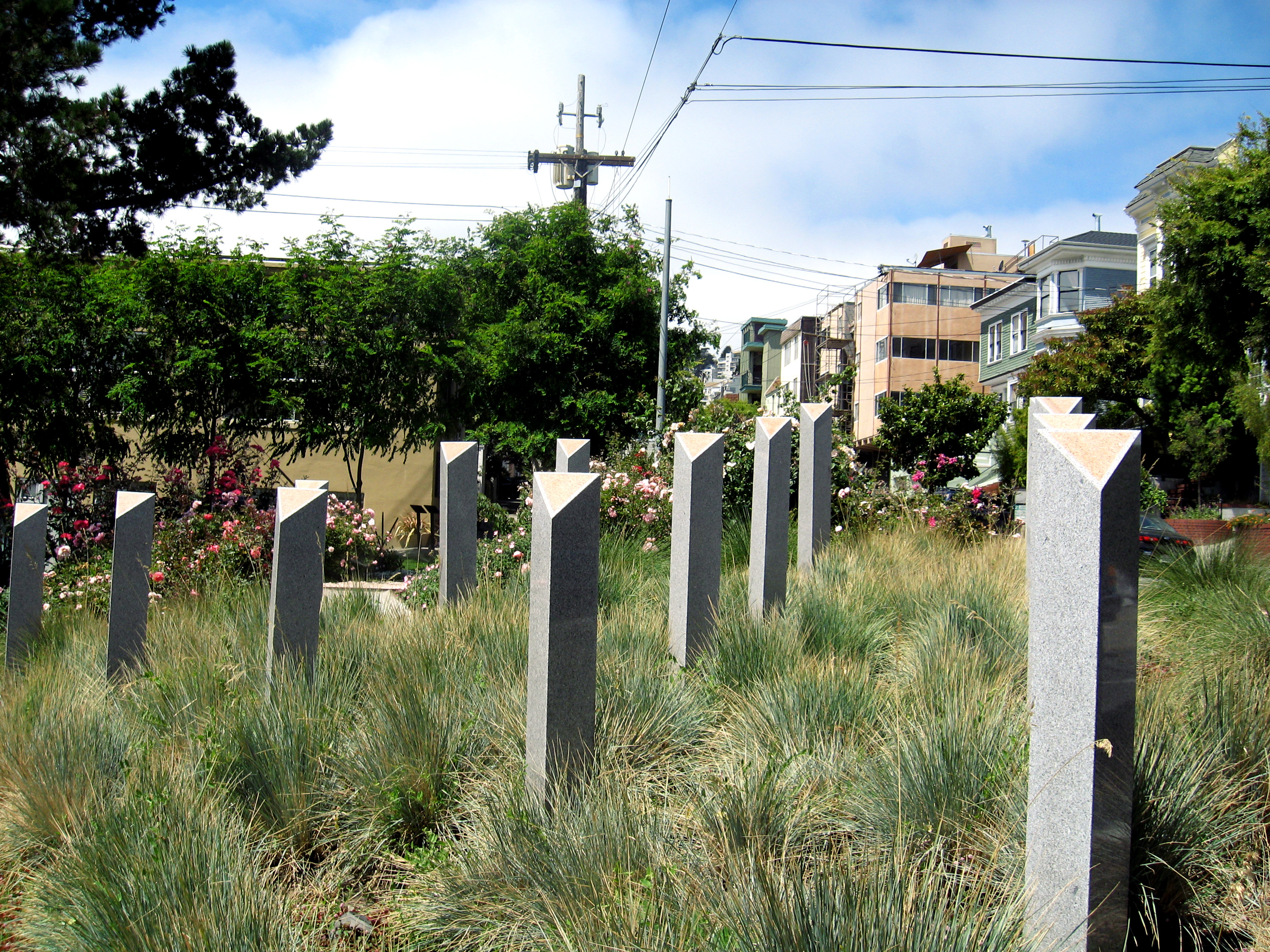
Pink Triangle Park, San Francisco

- California LGBTQ Veterans Memorial, Desert Memorial Park, Cathedral City
- Harvey Milk Plaza, San Francisco
- Mattachine Steps, Los Angeles, United States; dedicated on April 7, 2012
- Matthew Shepard Human Rights Triangle, Crescent Heights Boulevard and Santa Monica Boulevard, West Hollywood; named for Matthew Shepard, and dedicated in April 1999
- National AIDS Memorial Grove, San Francisco
- Pink Triangle Park, San Francisco

==== Florida ====
- Pulse Memorial and Museum, Orlando
- Pulse memorial mural at University of Central Florida, Orlando
- Key West AIDS Memorial, Key West

==== Illinois ====
- AIDS Garden, Chicago
- Legacy Walk, Chicago
- LGBT veterans monument (Chicago)
- LGBT veterans monument (Abraham Lincoln National Cemetery)

==== Minnesota ====
- East-Central Minnesota Pride historic marker recognizing the first rural LGBTQ Pride in Pine City, Minnesota.

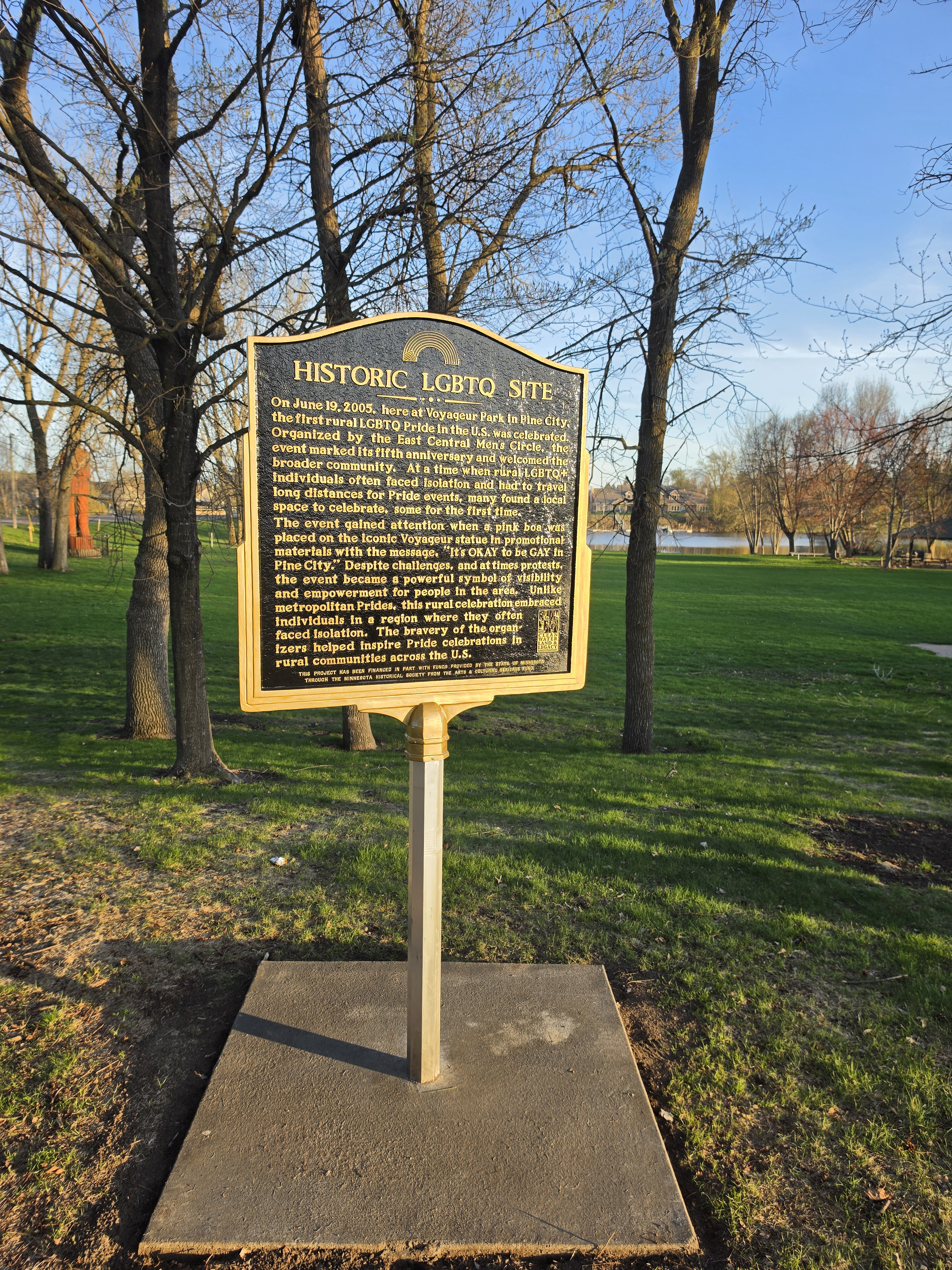
The First Rural Pride Historic Marker in Pine City, MN.

==== Missouri ====
- Transgender Memorial Garden, St. Louis

==== New York ====
- Gay Liberation Monument, Manhattan, New York City
- LGBTQ Memorial, Hudson River Park (West Village), New York City; opened July 2018; artist Anthony Goicolea
- A Love Letter to Marsha, Manhattan, New York City
- Marsha P. Johnson Memorial Fountain, Hudson River Park (West Village), Manhattan, New York City
- New York City AIDS Memorial, Greenwich Village, Manhattan, New York City
- Gertrude Stein Monument, Bryant Park, Manhattan, New York City
- Stonewall National Monument, Manhattan, New York City

==== Ohio ====
- Natalie Clifford Barney Historic Marker, Dayton; dedicated on October 25, 2009

==== Oregon ====
- Never Look Away, Portland

==== Pennsylvania ====
- John E. Fryer Marker, 13th & Locust Streets Philadelphia
- The Dewey's Sit-In Historic Marker, 17th and St. James streets, Philadelphia
- Edith Windsor Historical Marker, 13th & Locust Streets, Philadelphia
- Giovanni's Room, 345 S. 12th Street, Philadelphia
- Gloria Casarez Marker, Philadelphia
- Reminder Day Marker, Philadelphia
- Richard L. Schlegel Marker, Harrisburg
- Shapp Administration LGBT Initiatives, Harrisburg

==== Tennessee ====
- Penny Campbell Historical Marker, 1600 McEwen Avenue, Nashville; named in honor of LGBT activist, dedicated in December 2017
- The Jungle and Juanita's Historical Marker, Seventh Avenue and Commerce Street, Nashville; in honor of two bars popular with gay men in the 1960s-1980s, raided by the police in 1963; dedicated in December 2018

==== Texas ====
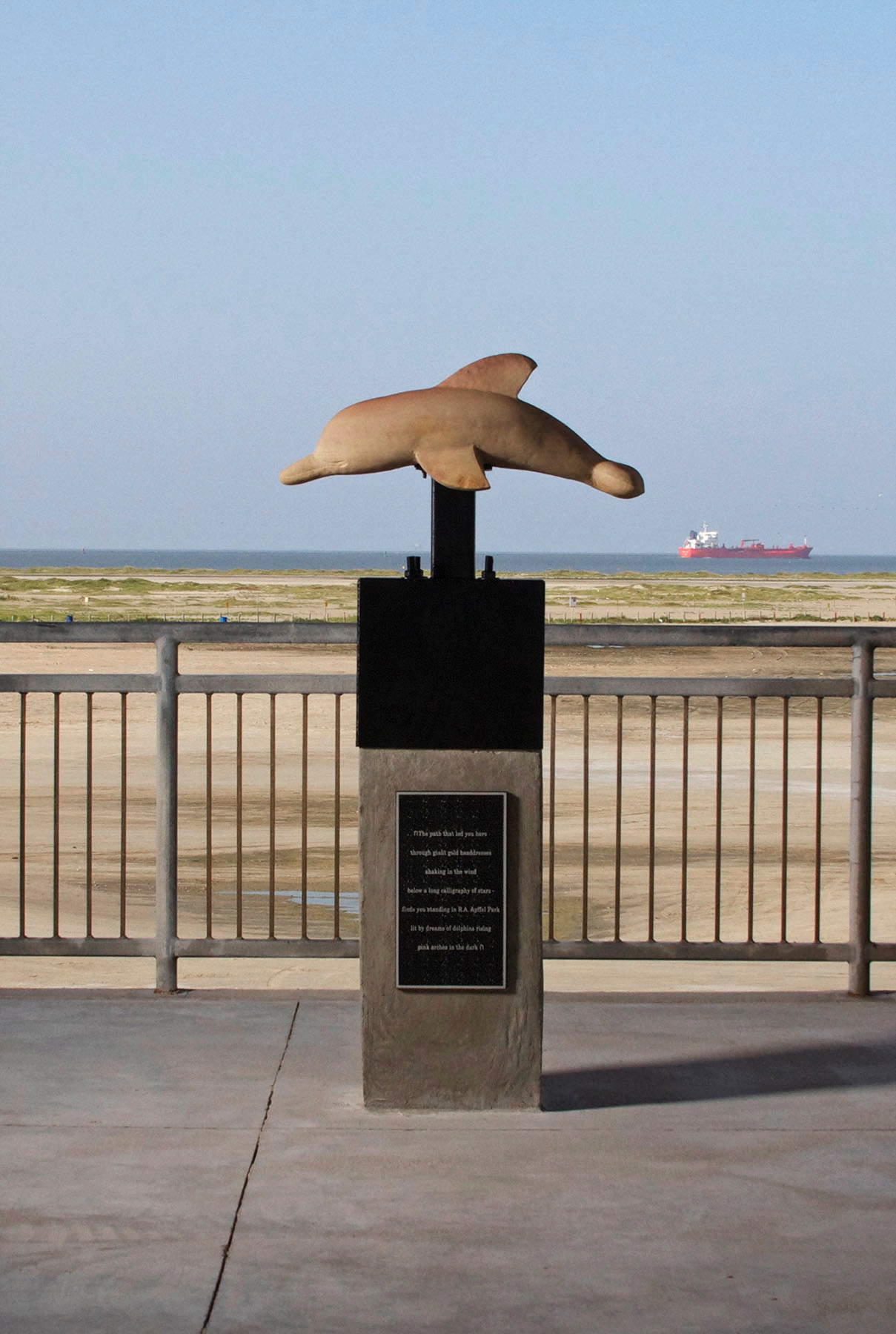
Pink Dolphin Monument, 2014

- Pink Dolphin Monument, Galveston Island

==== Washington, D.C. ====
- Dr. Franklin E. Kameny House, 5020 Cathedral Avenue, NW. Gay activist Frank Kameny's house, listed on the National Register of Historic Places

==== Puerto Rico ====
- Victims of the Pulse Night Club Shooting Memorial, 2016, Parque del Tercer Milenio, San Juan
- Monument to Dr. Rosalina "Talín" Ramos and the LGBTQ+ Community, 2021, Plaza Mirador in Poblado Boquerón, Cabo Rojo

=== Uruguay ===
- Plaza de la Diversidad Sexual, 2014, Ciudad Vieja, Montevideo

== Europe ==
=== Belgium ===
- My gay mythology - a monument to everyone, Brussels, 2007
- Regenboogmonument, Antwerp, 2015

=== Germany ===
- Frankfurter Engel, Frankfurt, 1994
- Memorial to gay and lesbian victims of National Socialism, Cologne, 1995
- Memorial to Homosexuals Persecuted Under Nazism, Berlin, 2008

=== The Netherlands ===
- Homomonument

=== United Kingdom ===
- AIDS Memorial Sculpture, Kemptown, Brighton
- LGBT Memorial, National Holocaust Centre and Museum, Laxton, Nottinghamshire, England
- LGBT+ Veterans Memorial at the National Memorial Arboretum in Staffordshire, England
- Alan Turing Memorial, Manchester, England
- Statue of Alan Turing, Bletchley Park, England
- Statue of Alan Turing, University of Surrey, England
- A Conversation with Oscar Wilde, London, England

=== France ===
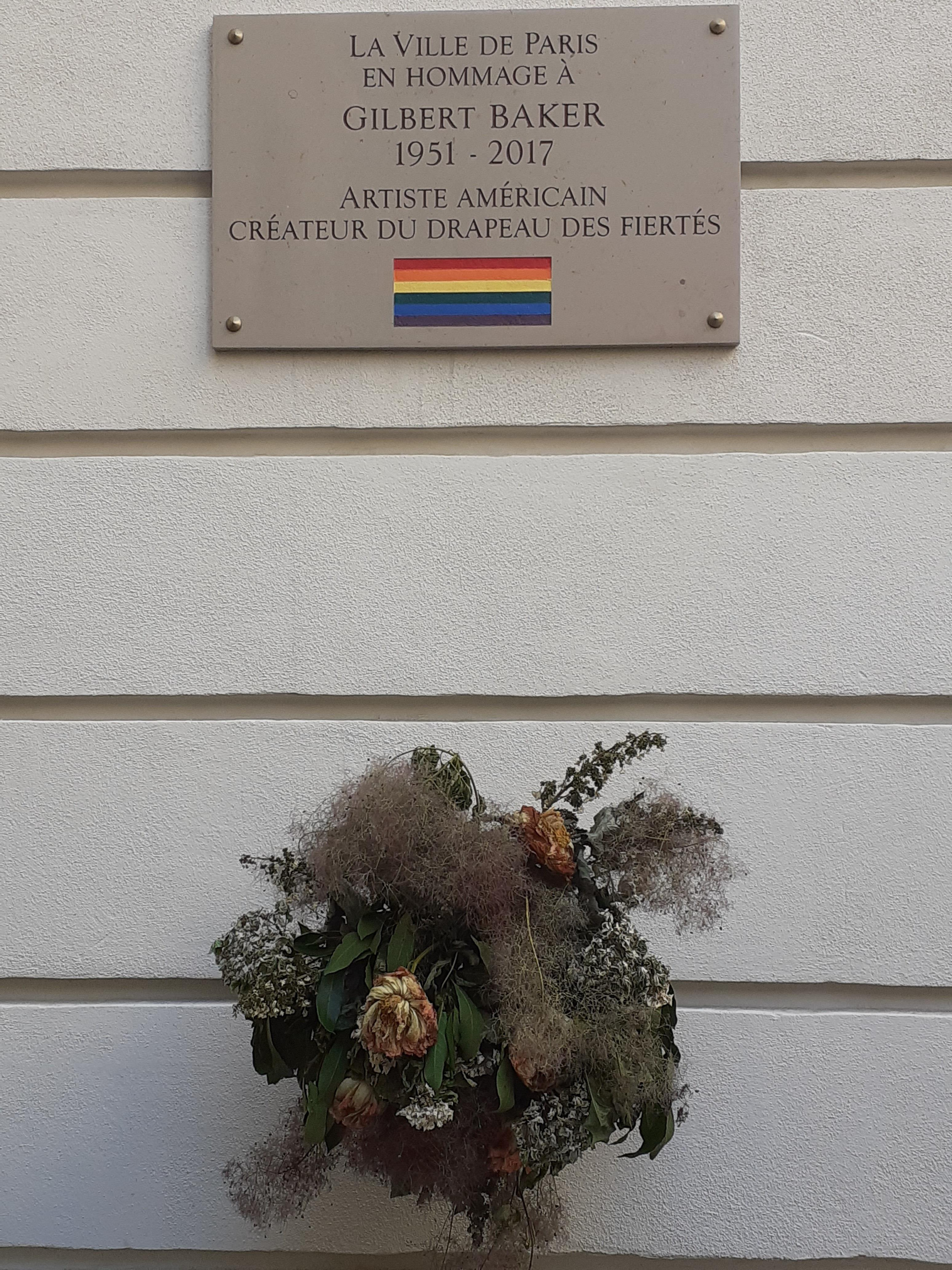
French official Memorial to Gilbert Baker, Place des Emeutes de Stonewall. Paris, Le Marais, France.

- Les Marches de la Fierté, Nantes
- The Council of Paris named, unanimously, squares, garden and streets after LGBT heroes: place Harvey-Milk, rue Pierre-Seel, place Ovida-Delect, Federico García Lorca Garden (Paris), jardin Marie Thérèse-Auffray, rue Eva-Kotchever, Mark Ashton Garden, promenade Coccinelle, or events such as Stonewall Riots Square
- A commemorative plaque, situated rue Montorgueil in Paris, pays tribute to the couple Jean Diot and Bruno Lenoir; the two men were the last persons executed in France as punishment for homosexuality in 1750

=== Spain ===
- Escultura al colectivo homosexual, Sitges
- Monolito en memoria a las personas represaliadas por el franquismo por su opción sexual, Durango
- Monumento en memoria de los gais, lesbianas y personas transexuales represaliadas, Barcelona
- Glorieta de la transexual Sònia, Barcelona
- Placa homenaje a los homosexuales encarcelados en la cárcel de Huelva, Huelva
- Plaza de Pedro Zerolo, Madrid
- Monuments in the Colonia Agrícola Penitenciaria de Tefía, Fuerteventura

== Australia ==
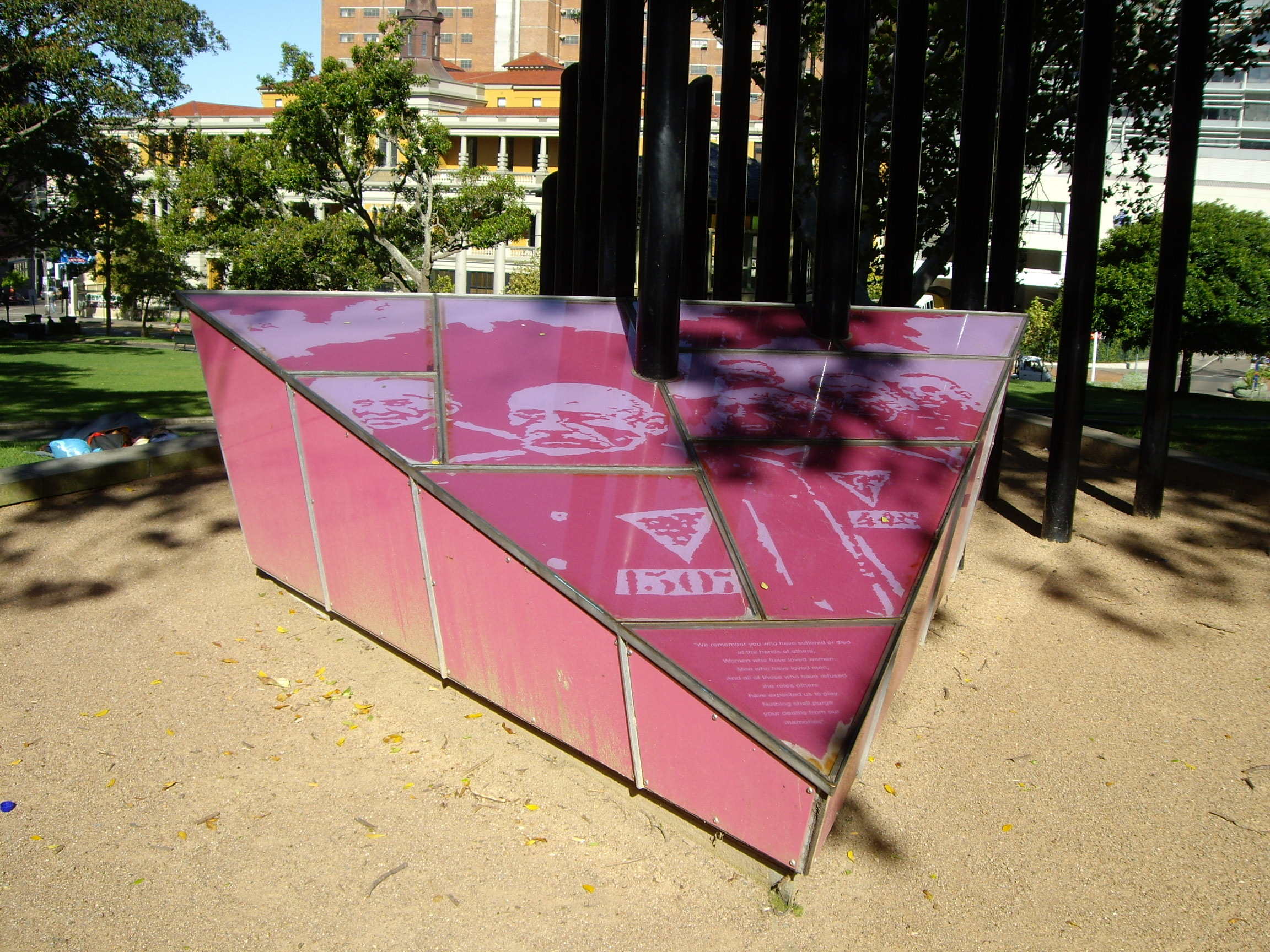
Sydney Gay and Lesbian Holocaust Memorial

- Sydney Gay and Lesbian Holocaust Memorial

== Asia ==
=== Israel ===
- Tel Aviv Gay and Lesbian Holocaust Memorial
