= Gloria Meneses =

Uruguayan activist

- Born: 1910
- Died: 1996 (aged 85–86)
- Occupation: Performer
- Known for: Human rights activism for the LGBT+ community

Gloria Meneses (1910–1996) was a Uruguayan performer and activist who lived openly as travesti from 1950 until her death. Highly unusual in Latin America at the time, Meneses' life has been widely honoured in films and exhibitions.

== Life ==
Meneses was born in 1910. She made her social transition in 1950 and took her name from the Brazilian actress Glória Menezes. Using an inheritance from an aunt to support herself, she acted in different theaters and clubs, such as Arco Iris, imitating the Argentine actress Tita Merello. Living openly as travesti was highly unusual at the time, later earning Meneses the nickname "the mother of travestis". In 1995, the Uruguayan director Aldo Garay premiered Yo, la mástremendous, where Meneses appeared with a group of other travestis from Montevideo. Meneses died in 1996.

== Legacy ==
In 2010, the Montevideo Photography Center held an exhibition titled Cien años de Gloria (One Hundred Years of Glory) in tribute to their fight for the recognition of sexual diversity. That same year, filmmaker Aldo Garay exhibited his work De ella La Gloria de Hércules (The Glory of Hercules), a short documentary that narrates Meneses' life, which was shown in a range of cultural spaces.

In 2022, the mayor of Montevideo, Carolina Cosse, proposed renaming a street in Barrio Sur to honor Gloria Meneses, highlighting her bravery.

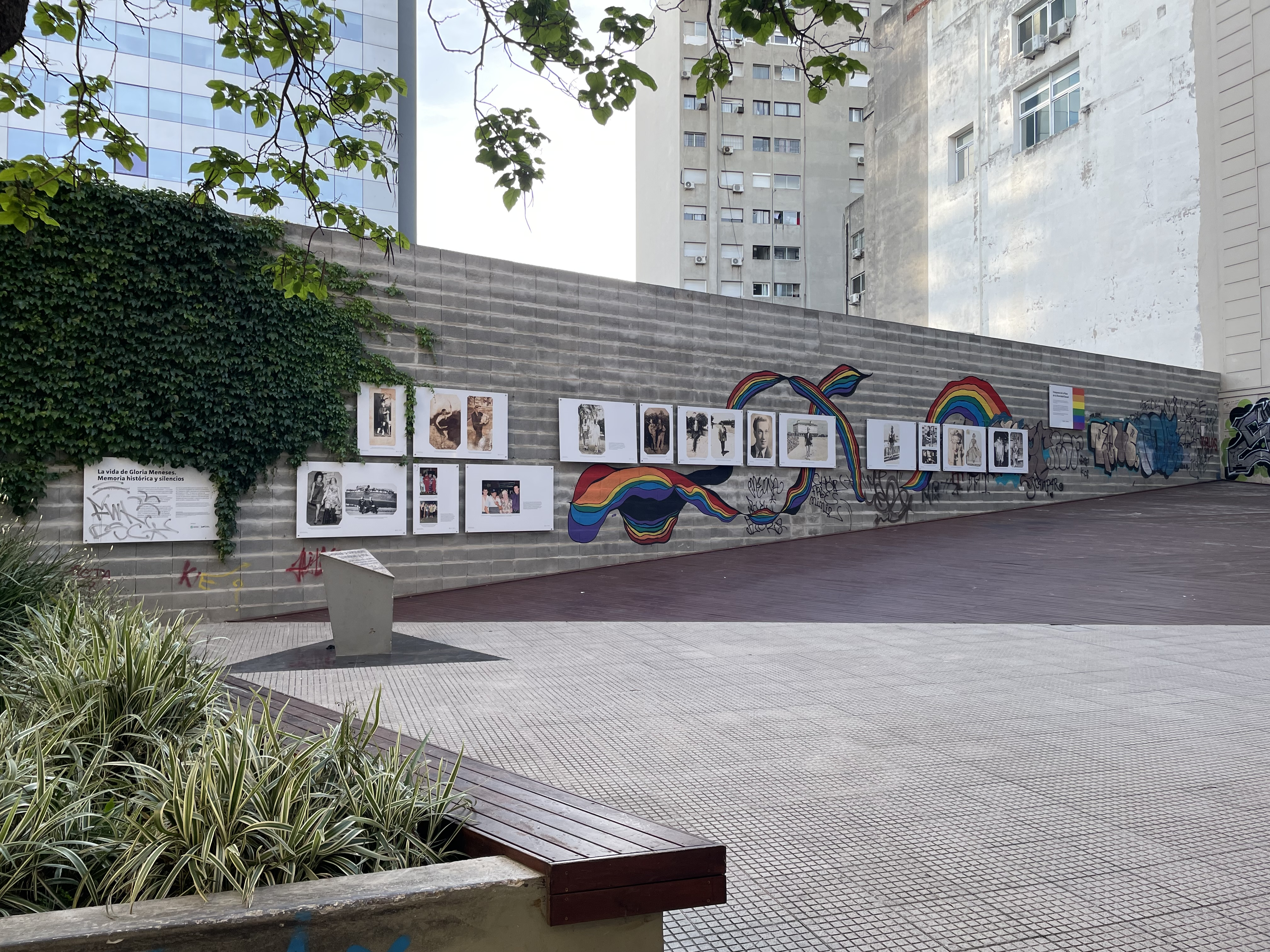
View of La vida de Gloria Meneses exhibition

In 2023, researchers Diego Sempol and Aldo Garay presented the outdoor exhibition La vida de Gloria Meneses. Memoria histórica y silencios (The Life of Gloria Meneses. Historical memory and silences) which brings together photographs of Meneses' life. It is displayed in the Plaza de la Diversidad Sexual, Montevideo.

== Filmography ==
- Yo, la mástremendous (1995)
- De ella La Gloria de Hércules (2010)
