= Federico García Lorca Garden (Paris) =

Urban park in Paris, France

Coordinates: 48°51′17″N 2°21′11″E

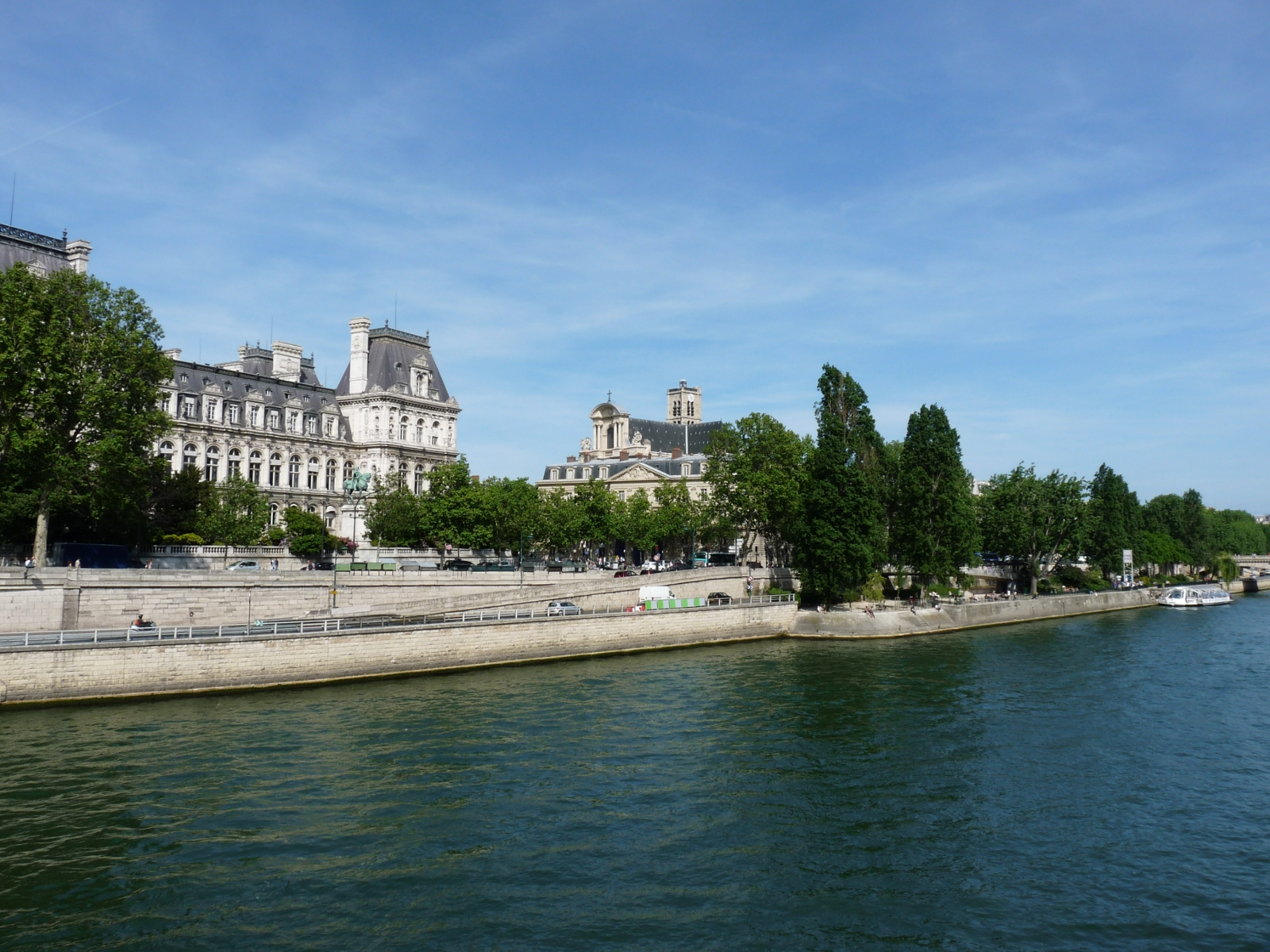
The Federico García Lorca Garden, the Quai de l'Hôtel de Ville and the Paris City Hall, on the right bank of the Seine

The Federico García Lorca Garden (in French : jardin Federico-García-Lorca) is a public park situated on the 4th arrondissement of Paris, in the heart of the French capital.

== Location ==
The park is situated near the Seine river, downstairs to the quai de l'Hôtel de Ville.

This site is serviced by the Hôtel de Ville metro station and Pont Marie metro station.

The Hôtel de Ville Batobus stop is situated precisely on the park.

== Tribute to Federico García Lorca ==
The park is named after Spanish poet Federico García Lorca (1898-1936), assassinated in Granada by the Francisco Franco's Militia during the Spanish Civil War, because of his homosexuality and Republican ideas.

== Points of interests ==
- Hôtel de Ville, Paris.
- Le Marais.
- Views on Notre-Dame-de-Paris, île de la Cité and île Saint-Louis.
- Jardin des Combattants-de-la-Nueve, tribute to the Spanish Republicans soldiers who liberated Paris on 24 August 1944.
