= Never Look Away (mural) =

2021 mural in Portland, Oregon, U.S.

- The mural on July 30, 2021
- Year: 2021
- Subject: Marsha P. Johnson; Rupert Kinnard; David Martinez; Angelica Ross; Kathleen Saadat
- Dimensions: 37 m (120 ft)
- Location: Portland, Oregon, United States; 45.5241°N 122.6778°W

Never Look Away is a mural in Portland, Oregon, United States. Installed in northwest Portland's Pearl District in 2021, the 37-foot-wide mural depicts eight LGBTQ activists including Marsha P. Johnson, Rupert Kinnard, and Angelica Ross. It is the first public art project in Oregon dedicated to the achievements of the LGBTQ community.

== Description ==
Never Look Away is a mural of eight LGBTQ activists, installed at the intersection of Northwest Broadway and Couch Street near the North Park Blocks in northwest Portland's Pearl District. Depicted Oregonians include Rupert Kinnard, an openly gay African-American cartoonist who created the first African-American LGBT comic strip characters; David Martinez, a founding board member of the Q Center and a co-founder of Portland Latino Gay Pride (now called PDX Latinx Pride); and activist and musician Kathleen Saadat. Other national figures include gay liberation activist Marsha P. Johnson and transgender rights advocate Angelica Ross.

According to Claudia Meza of Oregon Public Broadcasting, the mural is the "first public art project in the state dedicated to LGBTQ+ community achievements and progress". KOIN's Emily Burris said the mural is the city's first "dedicated to queer heroes". She wrote, "The mural is made up of colorful abstracts representing the struggle, growth and progress in a city known for its progressive policy, while acknowledging the work still to be done." The mural is approximately three stories tall and 120 feet (37 m) wide, according to lead artist and producer Cassandra Swan.

== History ==
Zoe Piliafas met Oregon LGBTQ rights activist Kathleen Saadat at a bar six years before the mural's installation. Piliafas has recalled:

I said, I know who you are. I'm going to be putting a mural up that's going to have you on it along with some other significant community members from the LGBTQ community. And [Saadat] said, "That sounds great. I'd like to see you do that. I'll wait."

Several people and groups helped the project come to fruition since 2019. In addition to Swan, Ruban Lawrence helped produce the painting. The organization Pride Northwest sponsored the artwork and offered recommendations for subjects to depict. The city funded maintenance and graffiti removal services and the Portland Street Art Alliance offered artist recommendations and production assistance. Additionally, Really Big Video's owners PJ and Maria Harvey provided use of a high-powered projector. Participating artists include Tommy Mack-Davis (known as Nafsi) and Kyra Watkins. The mural was painted in 2021.

== See also ==
- 2021 in art
- Culture of Portland, Oregon
- List of LGBTQ monuments and memorials
