= Sydney Gay and Lesbian Holocaust Memorial =

Memorial in Australia

Coordinates: 33°52′46″S 151°13′12″E

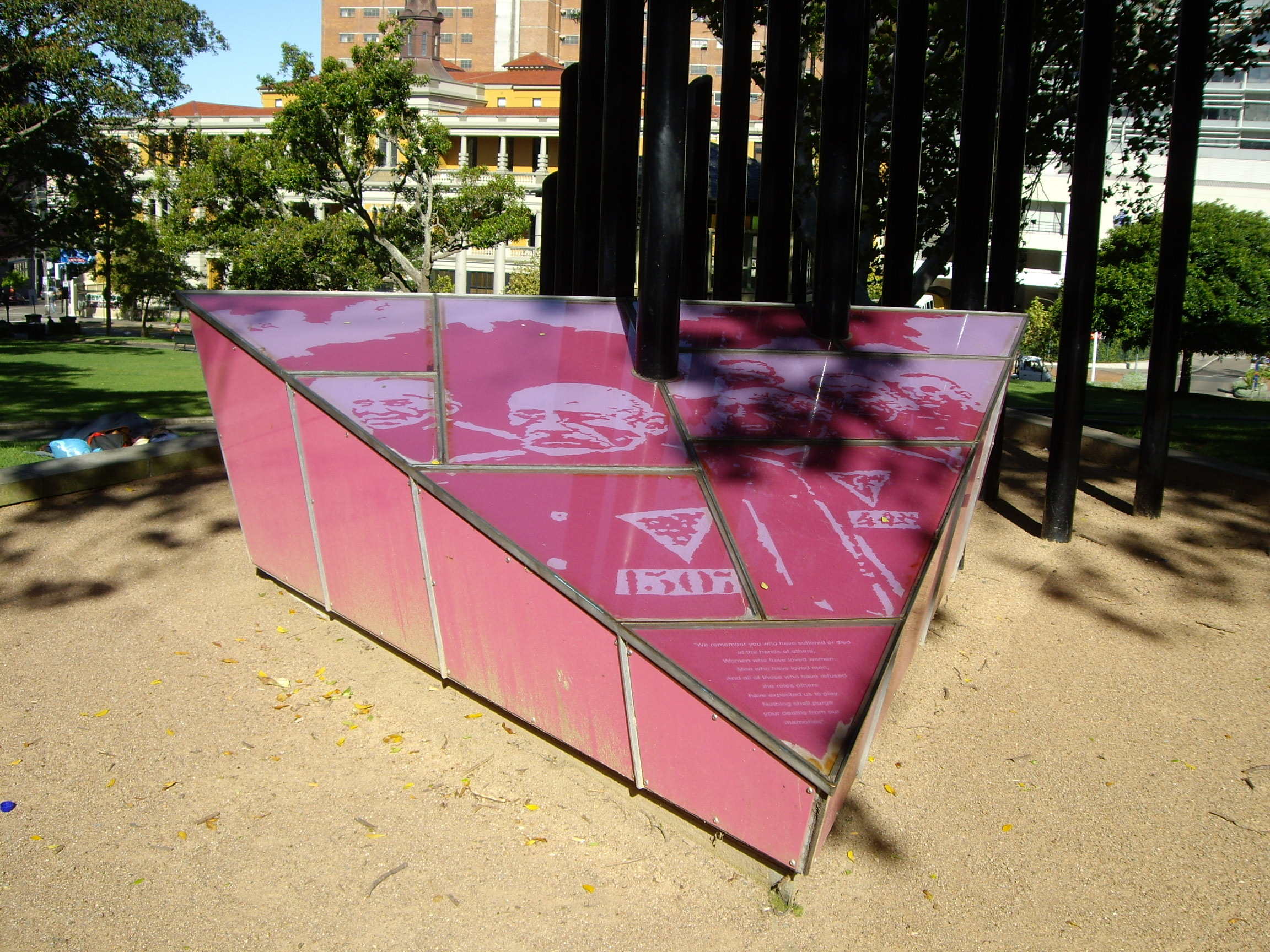
Gay and Lesbian Holocaust Memorial

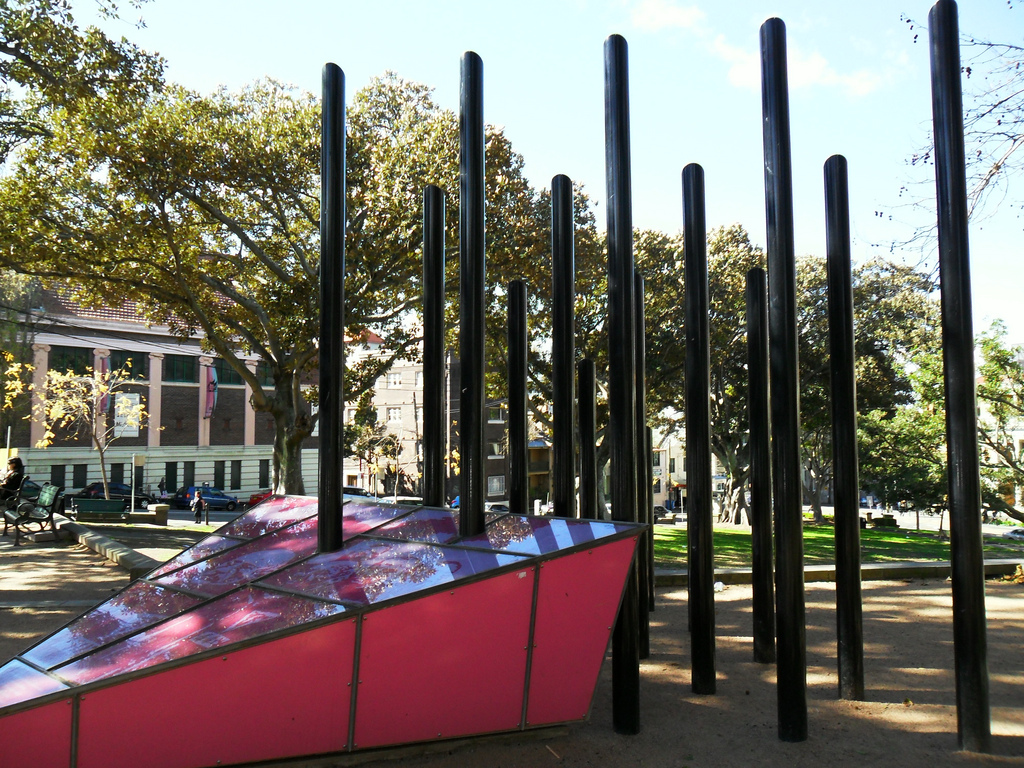
Sydney Gay and Lesbian Memorial

The Sydney Gay and Lesbian Holocaust Memorial Project was founded by a group of community activists. Over the years they raised funds and decided, with South Sydney City Council, on the site at Green Park in Darlinghurst, in Sydney, Australia. Darlinghurst is considered the heart of Sydney's gay and lesbian population. Green Park is adjacent to the Sydney Jewish Museum, which ensures that the memorial retains its historic meaning.

The memorial was built to honour gay men, lesbians, bisexuals and gender-diverse people who have been murdered, tortured and persecuted. It recreates symbols that were predominantly used throughout the Holocaust; a pink triangle to identify homosexual men, and a black triangle to identify lesbian women.

The memorial is a "pink triangular prism, made of enameled steel, and a grid of black steel columns in the form of a triangle". The two elements form a fractured Star of David, and was designed by Russell Rodrigo and Jennifer Gamble.

The inscription reads "We remember you who have suffered or died at the hands of others, women who have loved women; men who have loved men; and all those who have refused the roles others have expected us to play. Nothing shall purge your death from our memories." It was written by queer Jewish writer Rosanne Bersten and deliberately worded in order to include gay men, lesbians, bisexual people, people who didn't use a label to describe their sexuality and trans and gender-diverse people who were persecuted for their gender expression.

It was constructed over a period of months in 2000 and its dedication ceremony was on Tuesday, 27 February 2001, when the memorial was handed over to the custodianship of the Sydney Pride Centre. The dedicational speech was by Australian lawyer Marcus Einfeld.

== See also ==
- List of LGBT monuments and memorials
- Persecution of homosexuals in Nazi Germany and the Holocaust
