= Pink Dolphin Monument =

Public monument on Galveston Island, Texas, US

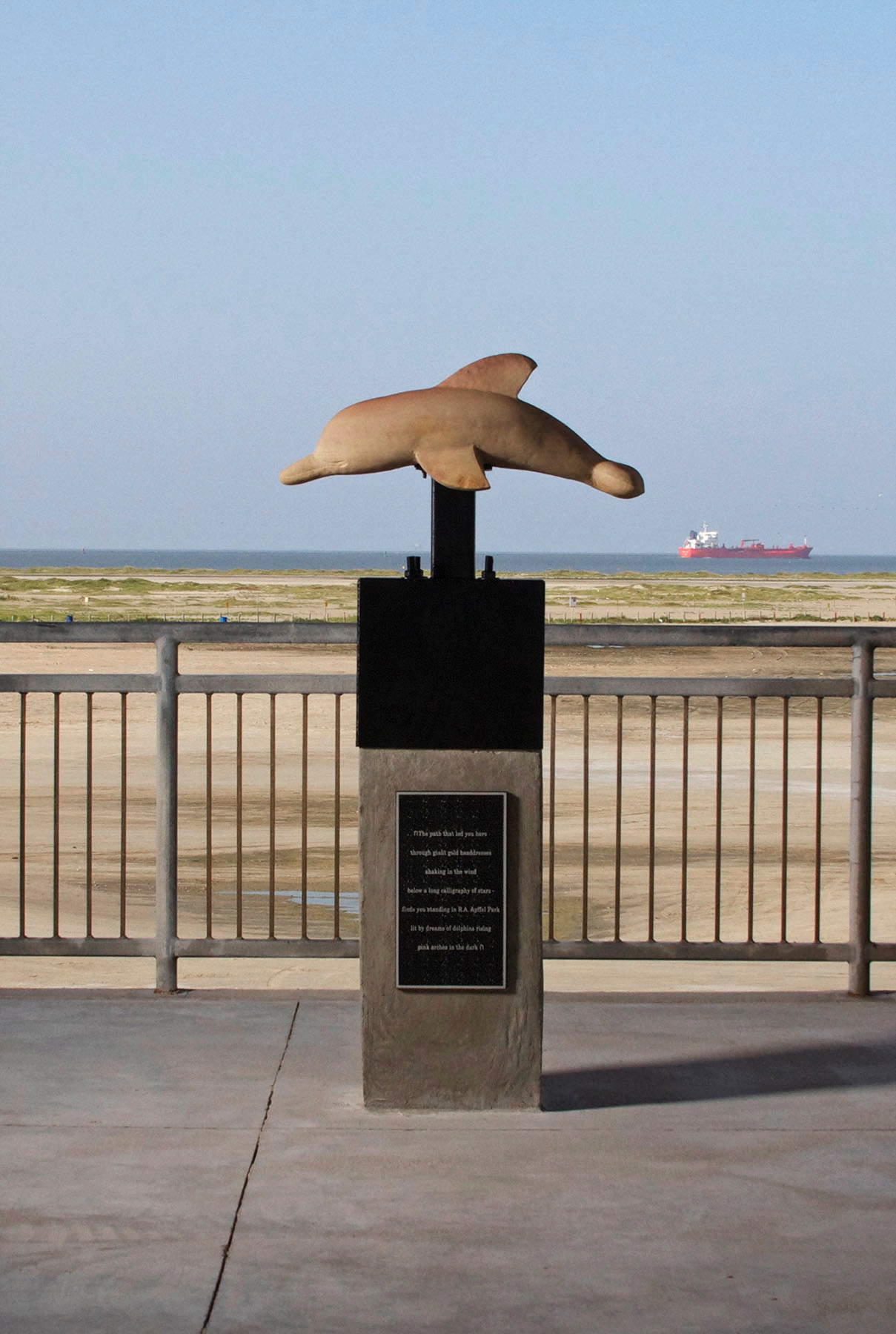
- Pink Dolphin Monument at R.A. Apffel Park, Galveston Island, Texas (2014)

- Artist: Joe Joe Orangias
- Completion date: July 25, 2014; 10 years ago
- Medium: Red sandstone sculpture
- Subject: Pink dolphin
- Dimensions: 36" x 16" x 13"
- Condition: Restored (2019)
- Location: Galveston Island, Texas
- 29.330247°N 94.735097°W
- Owner: R.A. Apffel Park/East Beach
- Website: Official website

Pink Dolphin Monument is a public monument in R.A. Apffel Park/East Beach on Galveston Island, Texas. Inaugurated on July 25, 2014, the monument is dedicated to celebrating gender and sexual minority communities. It is the first monument dedicated to gender and sexual minorities in the southern United States.

== History ==
The Pink Dolphin Monument was created by artist Joe Joe Orangias, in collaboration with writer Dr. Sarah Sloane and scientist Dr. Frank Pega. Orangias carved the monument’s central figure—a pink dolphin—from red sandstone sourced from the Texas coast. The image of the pink dolphin references the historic Pink Dolphin Tavern located in the city of Galveston. It also refers to the logo of the Pink Posse, a local group of gender and sexual minority activists. Orangias donated the monument to R.A. Apffel Park/East Beach to further the Park’s mission and contribute to honoring diversity on the island.

"There are starting to be more monuments for gender and sexual minorities around the world, so this piece adds to that network," the artist told the Galveston Daily News.

In 2015, Pink Dolphin Monument was featured in the "Island Time" exhibition at the Contemporary Arts Museum Houston.

Due to vandalism, artist Ryan Hawk completed a restoration project of the statue in 2019.

== Design ==
The main statue is the approximate size of a small dolphin (36″ × 16″ × 13″). It is supported by a five-foot plinth, which is designed to create an impression of a dolphin jumping overhead, in the Gulf of Mexico surrounding Galveston Island. The monument is housed in an open-aired pavilion and its pedestal replicates the columns that hold up the pavilion. The statue is accompanied by the following poem:

∩ The path that led you here
through giant gold headdresses
shaking in the wind
below a long calligraphy of stars—
finds you standing in R.A. Apffel Park
lit by dreams of dolphins rising
pink arches in the dark ∩

The carving of the dolphin statue resulted in 243 chips from the original sandstone boulder. Orangias carved these into 243 triangles and buried these on Galveston Island to further memorialize gender and sexual minorities into the landscape. The dust from carving the statue was collected and then poured into the ocean by participants at the unveiling ceremony.

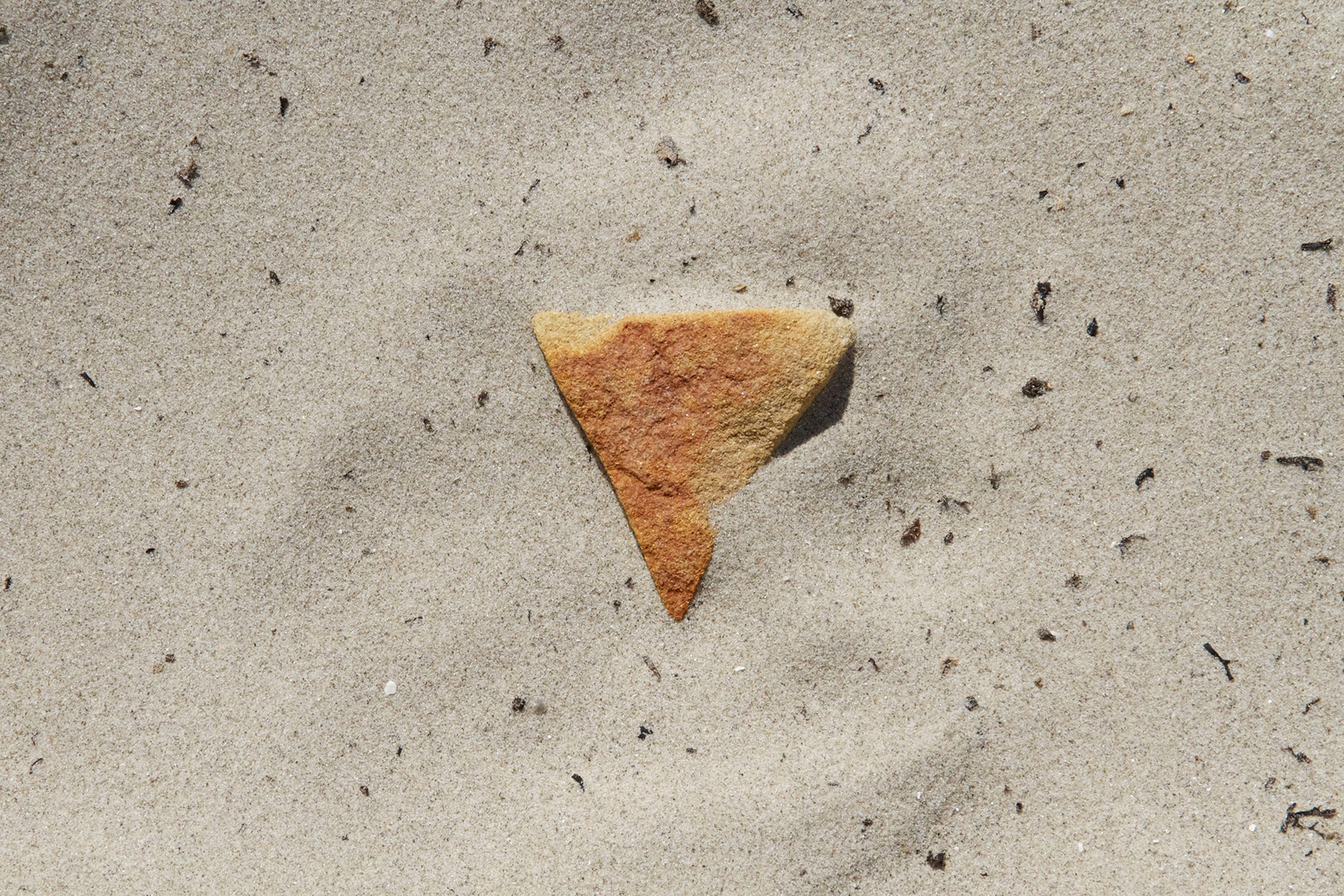
Pink Dolphin Monument (Burial 32 of 243), Galveston Island, Texas, 2014

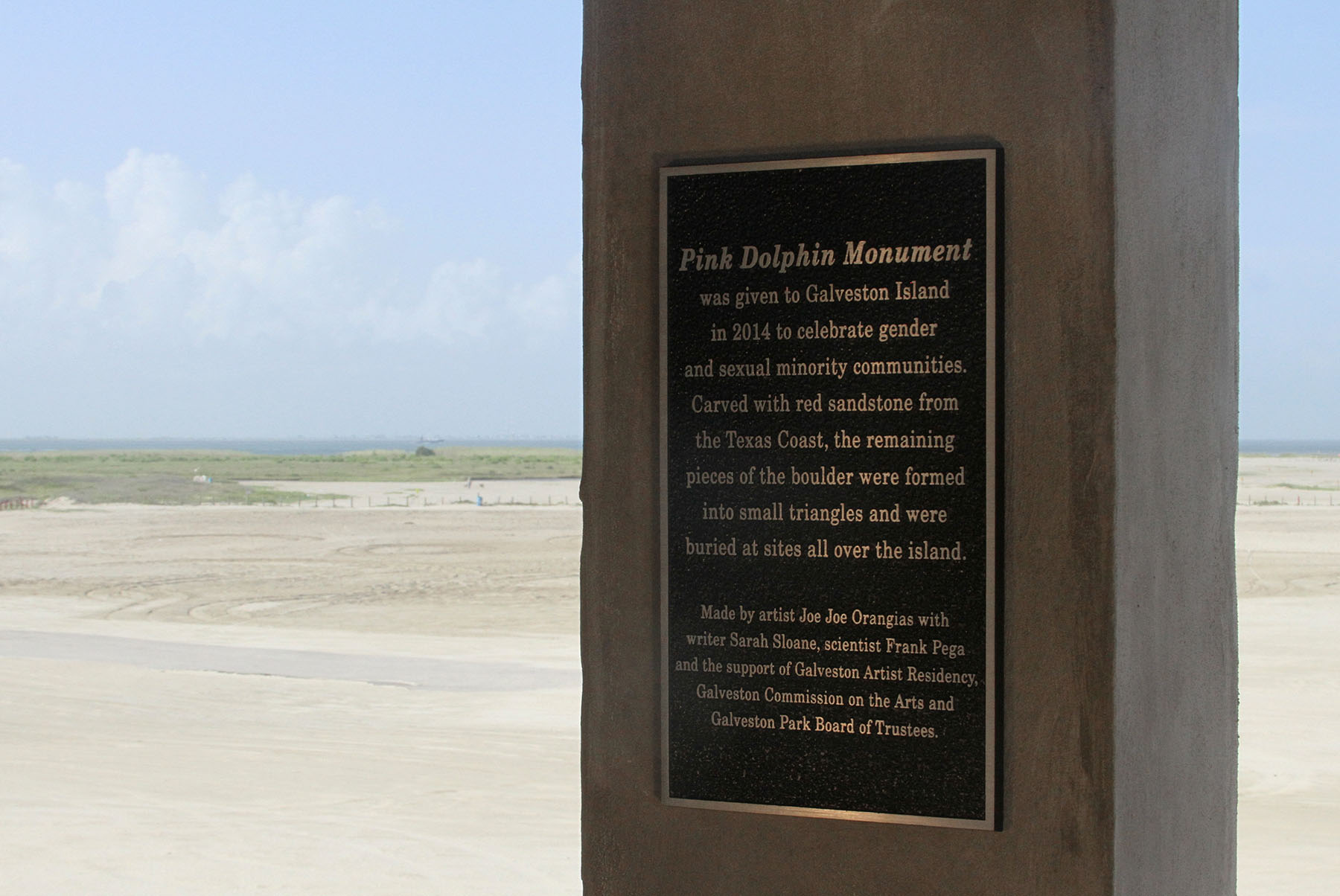
Pink Dolphin Monument (plaque), R.A. Apffel Park, Galveston Island, Texas, 2014

== See also ==
- List of LGBT monuments and memorials
