= Persecution of homosexual men in Nazi Germany =

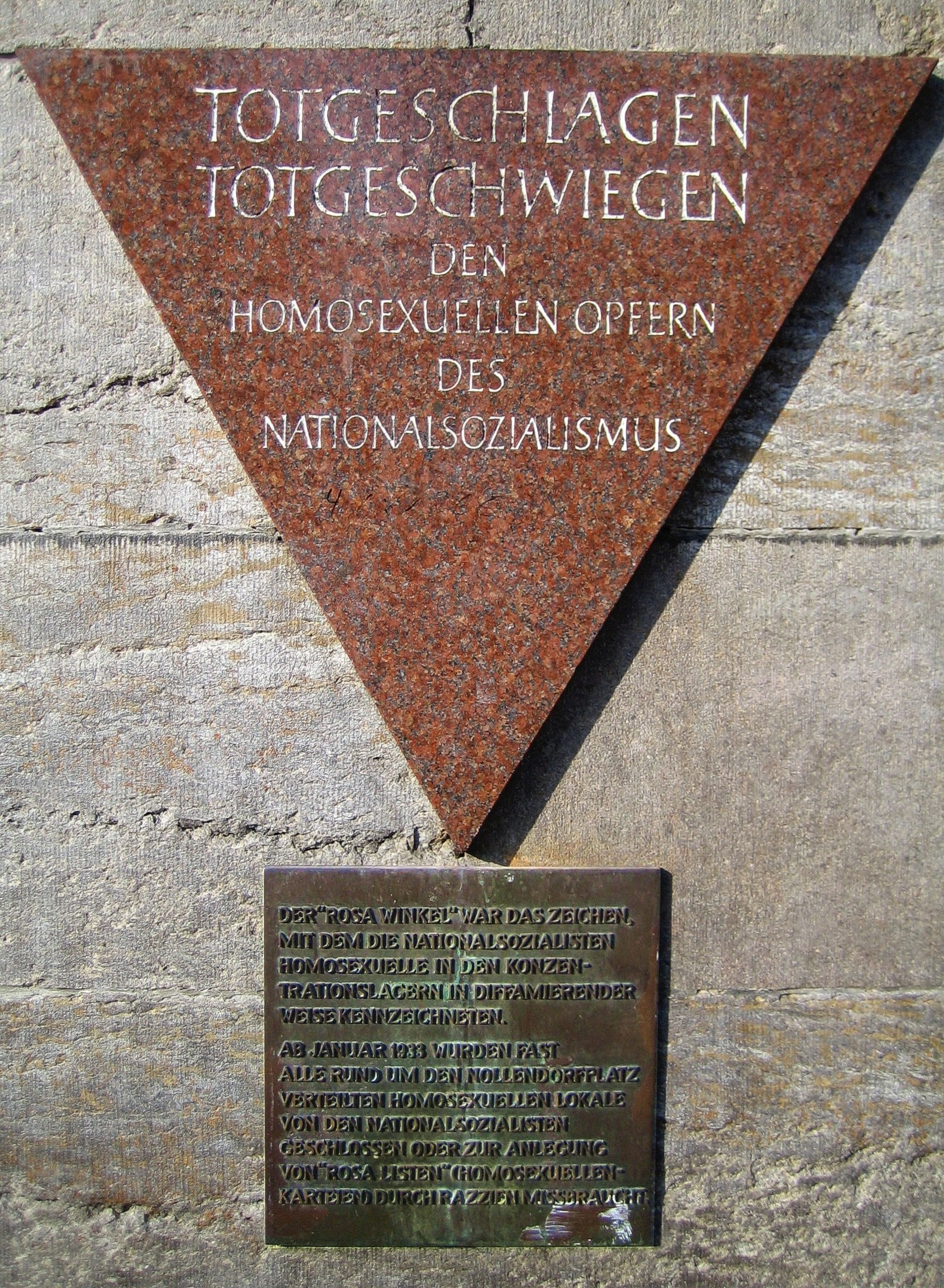
Memorial in Nollendorfplatz, Berlin. Text in triangle: "Struck Dead; Hushed Up; To the homosexual victims of National Socialism"; Text below: "The 'pink triangle' was the sign with which the National Socialists marked homosexuals in the concentration camps in a defamatory way. From January 1933 almost all homosexual locales in and around Nollendorfplatz were closed by the National Socialists or misused by raids to create 'pink lists' (homosexual files)."

Before 1933, male homosexual acts were illegal in Germany under Paragraph 175 of the German Criminal Code. The law was not consistently enforced, however, and a thriving gay culture existed in major German cities during the Weimar-era. After the Nazi takeover in 1933, the first homosexual movement's infrastructure of clubs, organizations, and publications was shut down. After the Röhm purge in 1934, persecuting homosexuals became a priority of the Nazi police state. A 1935 revision of Paragraph 175 made it easier to bring criminal charges for homosexual acts, leading to a large increase in arrests and convictions. Persecution peaked in the years prior to World War II and was extended to areas annexed by Germany, including Austria, the Czech lands, and Alsace–Lorraine.

The Nazi regime considered the elimination of all manifestations of homosexuality in Germany one of its goals, claiming it was a Jewish conspiracy to undermine the German people. Men were often arrested after denunciation, police raids, and through information uncovered during interrogations of other homosexuals. Those arrested were presumed guilty, and subjected to harsh interrogation and torture to elicit a confession. Between 1933 and 1945, an estimated 100,000 men were arrested as homosexuals; around 50,000 of these were sentenced by civilian courts, 6,400 to 7,000 by military courts, and an unknown number by special courts. Most of these men served time in regular prisons, and between 5,000 and 6,000 were imprisoned in concentration camps. The death rate of these prisoners has been estimated at 60 percent, a higher rate than those of other prisoner groups. A smaller number of men were sentenced to death or killed at Nazi euthanasia centres. Nazi Germany's persecution of homosexuals is considered to be the most severe episode in a long history of discrimination and violence targeting sexual minorities.

After the war, homosexuals were initially not counted as victims of Nazism because homosexuality continued to be illegal in Nazi Germany's successor states. Few victims came forward to discuss their experiences. The persecution came to wider public attention during the gay liberation movement of the 1970s, and the pink triangle was reappropriated as an LGBT symbol.

== Background ==
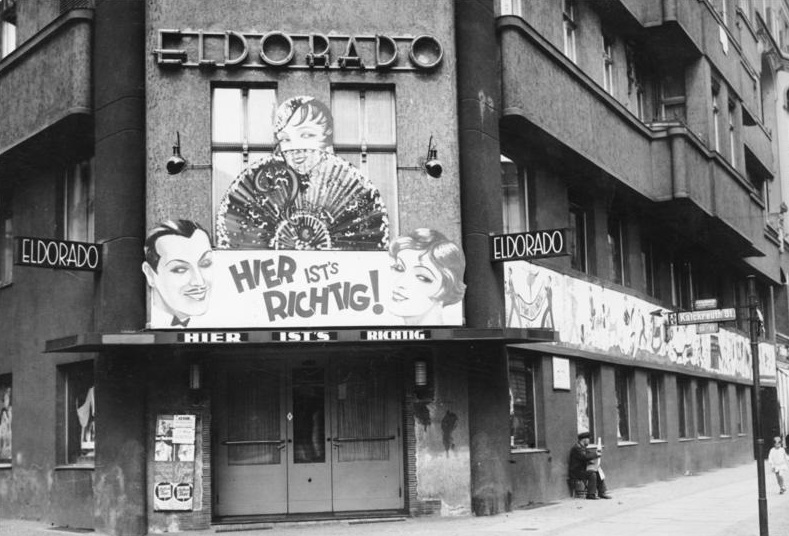
Eldorado (pictured in 1932), the most famous gay establishment in Germany

Germany was the home of the first homosexual movement. The word homosexual was coined by German-language writer Karl Maria Kertbeny; the first periodicals intended for a gay, lesbian, and transgender readership were published in Germany, and the world's first homosexual rights organization was founded in Berlin in 1897. In the 1920s gay culture flourished in Germany's major cities, especially Berlin. Political compromises allowed many homosexuals to live freely in their private lives and in dedicated subcultural spaces, provided they did not significantly infringe on the public sphere. One theory holds the Nazis' rise to power was fueled by a conservative backlash against perceived immorality, but according to historian Laurie Marhoefer, this was not a significant factor.

Paragraph 175 of the German penal code, which was passed after the unification of Germany in 1871, criminalized sexual acts between males. The German supreme court ruled that a conviction required proof the men had had penetrative sex, typically anal but sometimes oral sex; other sexual activities were not punishable. The Rechtsstaat limited the enforcement of the law because men were not arrested or indicted without concrete evidence. As a consequence, conviction rates were low and a significant number of those convicted were sentenced to pay a fine rather than serve a jail sentence. Terms exceeding one year were rare.

In 1928, the Nazi Party responded negatively to a questionnaire about their view of Paragraph 175, saying: "Anyone who even thinks of homosexual love is our enemy." Nazi politicians regularly railed against homosexuality, claiming that it was a Jewish conspiracy to undermine the German people. In 1931 and 1932, the Social Democrats publicized the homosexuality of Ernst Röhm, a prominent Nazi politician, in an attempt to discredit the Nazis. The Röhm scandal fuelled the long-lasting but false idea that the Nazi Party was dominated by homosexuals, a recurring theme in 1930s left-wing propaganda. The Nazi Party temporarily tolerated a few known homosexuals, including Röhm, but never adopted such tolerance as a general principle or changed its views on homosexuality. There is no evidence that homosexuals were over-represented in the Nazi Party.

== History ==
=== Nazi takeover and initial crackdown (1933) ===
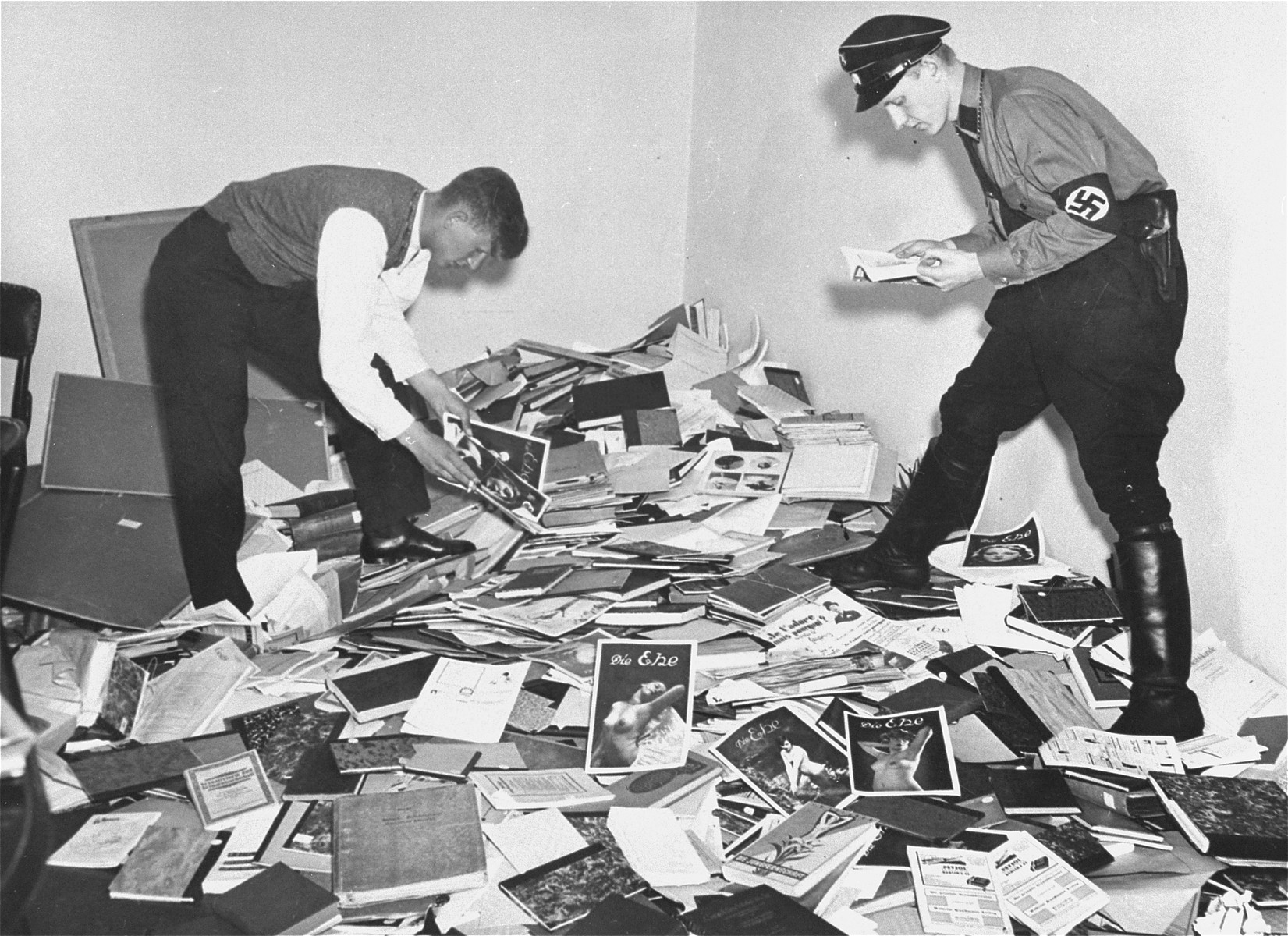
Raid on the Institute for Sexual Science, 6 May 1933

In mid-1932 a crackdown on homosexual subcultures in Prussia began after Chancellor Franz von Papen deposed the Prussian government. Some homosexual bars and clubs in Berlin had to shut down after police raids. In January 1933 the Nazi Party took power; immediately, their real and perceived enemies were the subject of a violent crackdown. On 23 February of that year the Prussian Ministry of the Interior ordered Berlin police to shut down any remaining establishments catering to "persons who indulge in unnatural sexual practices". This order was extended to other parts of Germany. In Cologne, almost all gay bars were forced to close. In Hanover all had closed by the end of the year. In Hamburg police targeted both prostitutes and homosexual spaces, including the main train station, public toilets, and gay bars, leading to a more-than-sixfold increase in indictments under Paragraph 175 by 1934. The anti-homosexual crackdown was intended to please the Nazis' conservative backers, who had put them into power, as well as socially conservative voters. Both the Vatican and Protestant churches praised the crackdown. For example, in October 1933 Clemens August Graf von Galen, the Bishop of Münster, wrote approvingly of the Nazis' efforts to "eradicate" the "open propaganda for godlessness and immorality".

In March 1933 the Nazi authorities began to confiscate printed material on homosexual topics. Any LGBT-related magazines that had survived earlier censorship were closed down and copies were burned. Their publishers were targeted; Adolf Brand's house was raided five times and police stole all of his photographs, 6,000 magazine issues, and many books. Friedrich Radszuweit's company was subjected to similar raids. During the Nazi takeover, German–Jewish homosexual-rights campaigner Magnus Hirschfeld was abroad on a lecture tour for the World League for Sexual Reform. On 6 May the Nazis' paramilitary wing, the SA, raided his Institute for Sex Research in coordination with German students. The institute's library of more than 12,000 books was publicly burned on 10 May on the Opernplatz; and its offices, together with those of The World League for Sexual Reform, were destroyed.

On 8 June the law-reform organization Scientific-Humanitarian Committee voted to dissolve itself. In 1933, many homosexual organizations attempted to destroy membership lists and other information the Nazis could use to target dissidents. Former activists made agreements to keep quiet to protect others. Some homosexuals, including Thomas and Klaus Mann, went into exile. The Swiss city of Basel in particular was a destination for homosexuals fleeing Nazi Germany. Other homosexuals of a more right-wing inclination, including Hans Blüher, who initially welcomed the Nazi takeover, remained in Germany. Some joined the SA, mistakenly believing that Röhm would protect them.

The most-visible members of the LGBT community, including prostitutes, transvestites, and activist leaders, were targeted, and high-profile locations were shut down. The average homosexual's daily life, however, did not change, and some gay bars in Hamburg and smaller cities remained open. Some men were able to adapt to the closures by meeting with gay friends in primarily heterosexual establishments. Most homosexuals were not yet afraid of the Gestapo. They believed they could keep a low profile until the end of the Nazi regime, seen as coming soon. During the initial years of Nazi rule, the number of men sentenced to prison under Paragraph 175 increased, from 464 in 1932 to 575 in 1933 and 635 in 1934. There was no systematic persecution of individual homosexual behavior, and until 1935, convictions remained below the high of 1,107 convictions set in 1925.

=== Röhm purge and expanding persecution (1934–1935) ===
After the 1933 revolution, Hitler began to see Röhm as a threat to his power and the SA as a liability due to their random acts of violence, which detracted from the Nazis' desired image as the party of law and order. On 30 June 1934 Röhm and several other SA leaders were suddenly arrested and executed. This event was later justified in Nazi propaganda, mainly through accusations of corruption and scheming with foreign powers, but also citing Röhm's homosexuality and the fact one of the victims of the purge, Edmund Heines, had allegedly been arrested while in bed with another man. Heinrich Himmler and Reinhard Heydrich, leaders of the SS (a rival of Röhm's SA), supported the purge to assert their control over the Nazi police state. Eventually Himmler, who is described by historian Nikolaus Wachsmann as "one of the most obsessive homophobes" in the Nazi government, became commander of the SS, the Gestapo, and the concentration camp system, making him the second-most-powerful man in Nazi Germany. The purge ended the sense of safety many German homosexuals still felt. Some homosexual Nazis ceased participating in the party while others, themselves former perpetrators of violence against Nazi opponents, became victims.

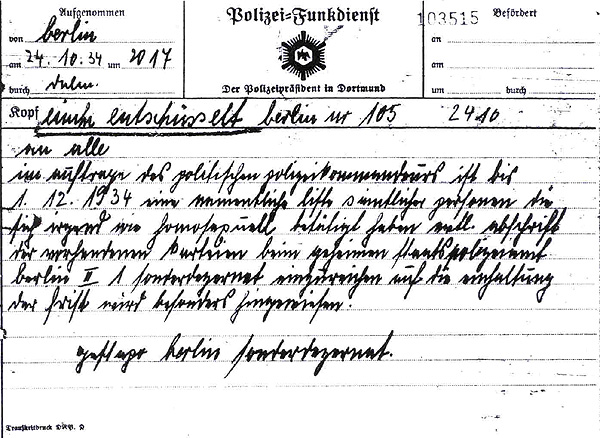
Gestapo Radio Telegram for a list of suspected homosexuals for the Chief of Police in Dortmund, 24 October 1934

Anti-gay repression began immediately after the purge, initially focusing on alleged homosexual cliques in the party and state bureaucracy. In October 1934 Heydrich ordered the police of all large cities to make a list of homosexuals. A separate Gestapo department, the Special Commission for Homosexuality in Berlin, was set up. In late 1934 the Gestapo targeted Berlin and Munich, raiding gay bars and making mass arrests of homosexual men; most of those arrested were not involved in politics. Many men accused of homosexuality would admit to acts that were not punishable under Paragraph 175, expecting to be released; instead, they were mistreated and incarcerated in Columbia-Haus, Lichtenburg, or Dachau concentration camp. By early 1935, 80 percent of the prisoners held in protective custody in the concentration camps were there for alleged homosexuality. To convict these men, it was decided to change the criminal code.

Almost exactly a year after Röhm was killed, Paragraph 175 was amended in line with changes demanded in particular by prosecutors and other legal professionals. The new version of the law punished all homosexual acts, defined broadly; "objectively when a general sense of shame is harmed and subjectively when there exists the lustful intention to excite either of the two men or a third party". In theory, it became a crime to look at another man with desire. Men were convicted for mutual masturbation or simply embracing each other, and in a few cases when no physical contact had occurred. Under the new law, typically all participants were viewed as equally guilty, whereas under the previous law, the "active" and "passive" participants were differentiated. The new law made it much easier to arrest and convict homosexual men, leading to a large increase in convictions. Under a new section 175a, the law also introduced harsher penalties for male prostitution, sex with a man younger than 21, or sex with a student or employee. The change in the law was not publicized for fear of spreading knowledge of homosexuality. Most Germans were unaware the law had changed and many of those arrested under the new law had no knowledge they were committing a crime. The law was also applied retroactively.

=== Peak of persecution (1936–1939) ===
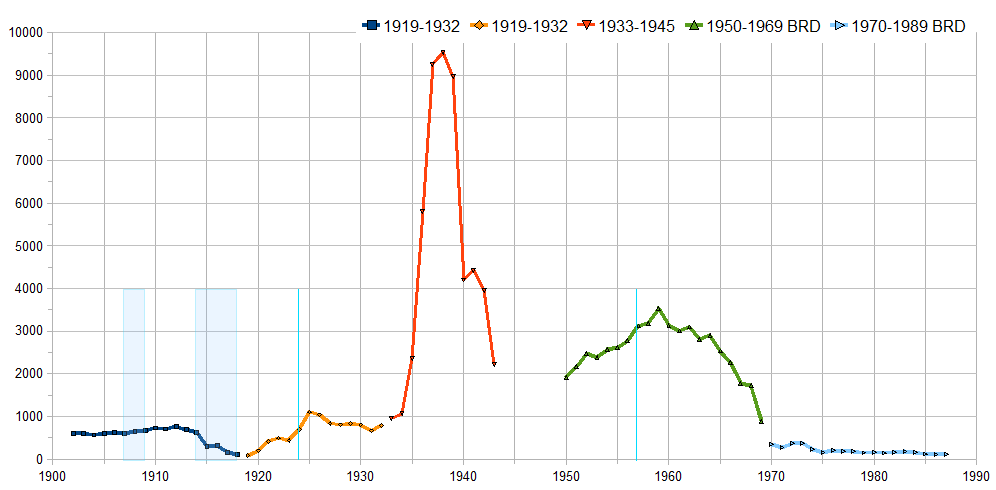
Number of convictions under Paragraph 175 over time

From 1936 to 1939, German police focused on homosexuality as a top priority. In 1936 the Special Commission for Homosexuality in Berlin became the Reich Central Office for the Combating of Homosexuality and Abortion, working with Gestapo Special Bureau II S. The new office organized conferences and issued directives to increase the effectiveness of anti-homosexual persecution. During the first years of Nazi rule, regional differences in the prosecution of homosexuals reflected pre-Nazi trends in policing but in 1936, the police launched a nationwide campaign against homosexual meeting places. This campaign was less effective in rural than urban areas, which saw a greater number of prosecutions. If the Gestapo believed there were not enough charges for homosexuality being brought in a certain area, they would send in a special unit to train and encourage local criminal police. In March 1937, Himmler ordered police departments to make lists of suspected homosexuals and oblige them to register changes of address, and to monitor suspected homosexual meeting places, hotels, and personal ads in newspapers.

Police and courts were not given any additional personnel or resources for the anti-homosexuality campaign, which caused serious operational difficulties. Besides the significant increase in the number of criminal cases to be prosecuted, cases of homosexuality demanded more time and attention because of the difficulty of proving private conduct. To identify homosexuals, some police departments resorted to calling in entire classes of teenage boys and asking them about their sexual experiences. In this manner, it was possible to increase the number of charges of homosexuality brought; by 1939, youthful experiences such as these made up 23.9 percent of total charges. Himmler approved of these methods, arguing that otherwise homosexuality would spread unchecked in all-male Nazi institutions.

Between 1937 and 1939 nearly 95,000 men were arrested for homosexuality – more than 600 per week – representing a major investment from the Nazi police state. From 1936 to 1939, nearly 30,000 men were convicted under Paragraph 175. Unlike in the past, these men were virtually guaranteed to receive a jail sentence, and the length of sentences increased; many men were sentenced to years in jail. Prosecutors, judges, and others involved in these cases increasingly cited Nazi ideology to justify harsh punishment, adopting the regime's rhetoric of "stamping out the plague of homosexuality". The use of concentration camp imprisonment increased; after 1937, those considered to have seduced others into homosexuality were confined to concentration camps.

=== World War II ===
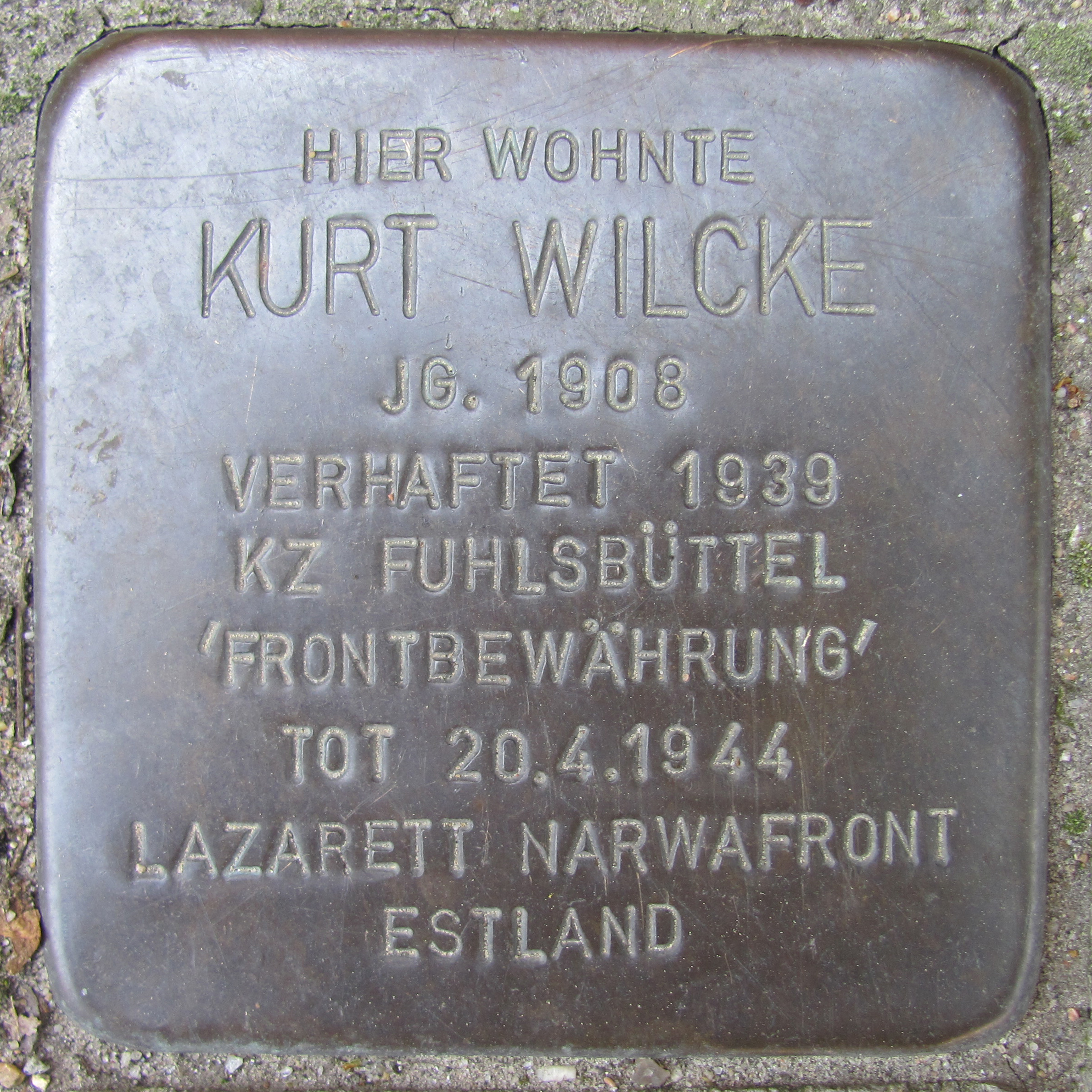
Stolperstein of Kurt Wilcke (1908–1944); imprisoned for his homosexuality in Fuhlsbüttel concentration camp; later transferred to a penal battalion; died during the Battle of Narva.

From 1939 to 1940, the number of men sentenced in civil courts under Paragraph 175 fell from 7,614 to 3,773. More men were subject to military jurisdiction and, with the onset of war, homosexuality was no longer the top priority of the security police. In anticipation of the outbreak of war, at the end of August 1939, Heydrich ordered the Gestapo to transfer most homosexual cases to the Kriminalpolizei (criminal police or Kripo) to free up resources for the persecution of opposition groups. It is unknown how many Paragraph 175 cases were handled by the special courts.

An estimated 6,400 to 7,000 men were convicted by the military courts in Nazi Germany under Paragraph 175. The military considered homosexuals to be predators who disrupted morale and unit cohesion. Prior to the war, homosexuals were offered re-education and if this failed, they could be dismissed and incarcerated in a concentration camp for the duration of their compulsory military service. Under the manpower requirements of war, it was felt necessary to recruit all available men; it was also a concern that rejecting homosexuals from military service could open a loophole for draft evaders. Men considered sex offenders, including homosexuals, rapists, and child molesters, could serve in the German military assuming they were willing to bear arms and remain celibate during their military service. Known homosexuals and some former concentration camp prisoners were conscripted. Even castrated homosexual men could be drafted.

Military courts were generally more lenient than civilian courts with cases involving consensual sex but harsher in cases falling under 175a. Although military courts followed the 1935 version of Paragraph 175, they generally issued a conviction only when there was attempted or actual contact with another man's genitals. More than 90 percent of those convicted were reintegrated into the military. Although innate homosexuals were considered dangerous to the military, the German military assumed that most cases of homosexuality were situational. Younger men, often seen as the victims of homosexual seducers, and one-time offenders were shown leniency. On average, soldiers convicted of homosexuality were sentenced to one-year prison sentences but served only a fraction of this before being paroled to the front. The length of time served decreased because of the increasing manpower shortage. In 1943 Himmler, who believed that the military was not hard enough on homosexuality, demanded a classification system that would see "incorrigible" homosexual offenders sent to concentration camps. The military attempted to ensure as many men as possible were retained under military jurisdiction to preserve vital manpower but cooperated with the Gestapo to rid itself of a few men who were seen as a threat to the military. Beginning in 1944 some homosexual concentration camp prisoners were forcibly enlisted in the army, which continued until a week before the unconditional surrender of Germany. These men were typically recruited into penal battalions, especially the Dirlewanger Brigade.

=== Annexed territories ===
The persecution of homosexuals was extended to the annexed territories but not to the rest of German-occupied Europe; the Nazis were mostly uninterested in punishing homosexuals who were not considered ethnically German. Criminal prosecutions of men for homosexuality in Austria almost doubled under Nazi rule. Both regular and special courts applied draconian punishments, including the death penalty. German law was applied in the Sudetenland after its annexation in late 1938 and, in the case of homosexuals, applied retroactively. German law was imposed in Alsace–Lorraine in January 1942; homosexuals there soon faced a harsh legal crackdown, including retroactive application of the law.

In the Protectorate of Bohemia and Moravia, German law applied to ethnic Germans and the old Austrian criminal code, which imposed lower penalties for male homosexuality, applied to non-Germans. Czech men were not deported to concentration camps solely because of conviction for homosexuality, but sometimes they were deported in combination with other reasons, such as anti-Nazi activity. Although prosecutions increased dramatically during the German occupation, the police focused their efforts on breaking up male prostitution rings rather than homosexual relationships between Czechs. In 1945 Edvard Beneš, president of Czechoslovakia, offered an amnesty to those convicted for homosexuality during the occupation, although the law remained in effect.

== Nazi views of homosexuality ==
The Nazis were influenced by earlier ideas conflating homosexuality, child molestation, and the "seduction of youth". Before the Nazis' rise to power, there was a widespread belief among Germans that homosexuality is not inborn but instead could be acquired and spread. The Nazis were particularly concerned that their all-male organizations such as the Hitler Youth, SS, and SA must not be seen as hotbeds of homosexual "recruitment". Based on the theories of Karl Bonhoeffer and Emil Kraepelin, the Nazis believed homosexuals seduced young men and infected them with homosexuality, permanently changing their sexual orientation. Rhetoric described homosexuality as a contagious disease but not in the medical sense. Rather, homosexuality was a disease of the Volkskörper (national body), a metaphor for the desired national or racial community (Volksgemeinschaft).

The Nazis, especially Himmler, held conspiratorial beliefs about homosexuals, believing they were more loyal to each other than to the Nazi Party and Germany. After the Röhm purge, he told Gestapo personnel they had narrowly avoided the capture of the state by homosexuals. In 1937 a headline in the SS magazine Das Schwarze Korps declared homosexuals "enemies of the state", explaining they must be eradicated because "... they form a state within a state, a secret organization that runs counter to the interests of the people." The newspaper argued only two percent of those who engaged in homosexual acts were committed homosexuals and the rest could be turned away from homosexuality. Forty thousand homosexuals were considered capable of "poisoning" two million men if left to roam free. Homosexual men were also considered to be shirking their duty to repopulate the German nation after World War I and create sons who could be drafted into the military to fight Hitler's planned wars of aggression. On 18 February 1937 Himmler gave a speech about homosexuality in Bad Tölz that was based on the 1927 book Eroticism and Race by Herwig Hartner, which claimed homosexuality was a Jewish plot against Germany. According to Himmler, homosexuality could lead to the end of Germany and cause depopulation by reducing the number of men who were available for reproduction.

The Nazis distinguished between congenital homosexuals who would require permanent imprisonment and others who had engaged in homosexuality but were thought to be curable with a short stay in a concentration camp or psychiatric treatment. Distinguishing between these categories was a difficulty that preoccupied the Nazis, especially after many cases of homosexuality surfaced in the supposedly racially pure SS. Succumbing to a homosexual act once, especially when drunk, was not necessarily considered evidence of homosexual inclination. The Göring Institute offered treatment to homosexuals referred by the Hitler Youth and other Nazi organizations; by 1938 it claimed to have changed the sexual orientation in 341 of 510 patients and by 1944, it claimed to have eliminated homosexuality in more than 500 men. The institute intervened to reduce sentences in some cases. The converse of the Nazis' persecution of homosexuality was their encouragement of heterosexual relations, including extramarital sex, for racially desirable people.

After 1934, homophobia became a regular theme in Nazi propaganda; most Germans came into contact with this homophobic propaganda. Although one of the Nazi regime's goals was to eliminate all manifestations of homosexuality in Germany, there was never a Nazi policy of exterminating all homosexuals in the way the Final Solution targeted Jews.

== Methods ==
=== Identification and arrest ===
Homosexuals were more difficult to round up than other groups the Nazis targeted. Police were given detailed instructions on spotting homosexuals; they were instructed to look for flamboyant men, those who avoided women or were seen walking arm-in-arm with other men, and anyone who rented a double room at a hotel. Hairdressers, bathhouse attendants, hotel receptionists, railway station porters, and others were asked to report suspicious behavior. Complicating the Nazis' efforts, many homosexual men did not fit these stereotypes and many effeminate men were not homosexual.

According to one estimate, denunciations resulted in 35 percent of arrests of homosexuals. Men were denounced by neighbors, relatives, coworkers, students, employees, or even ex-boyfriends seeking to settle grievances, passers-by who overheard suspicious conversation, and Hitler Youth and other Nazi supporters who voluntarily acted as the morality police. State employees working in youth welfare and rail stations, Nazi functionaries in the German Labor Front (DAF), the SA, the SS, and the Hitler Youth brought cases to the attention of the authorities. A disproportionate number of denunciations concerned child abuse or "youth seduction" because there was an injured party to complain. Some men were falsely denounced as homosexual by other Germans. The snowball method involved arresting one man, interrogating him, and searching his belongings to find additional suspects; this method accounted for thirty percent of arrests. Some men were observed before their arrests or temporarily released in hopes they would lead the police to additional suspects. Some were shown photograph albums of other suspected homosexuals; male prostitutes were often willing to identify other homosexuals this way. Another ten percent of victims were arrested in police raids, which were often conducted in parks, public toilets, and areas frequented by male prostitutes. In Hamburg the police watched restaurants that served a mixed heterosexual and homosexual clientele as well as the most-trafficked public toilets. Entrapment was also used to ensnare homosexuals.

Charges of homosexuality were sometimes deployed against people who were not guilty. Nazi propaganda minister Joseph Goebbels commented: "When Himmler wants to get rid of someone, he just throws §175 at him." About 250 Catholic clergy were charged with same-sex activity in the mid-1930s. Many of the charges, which included sexual abuse of minors and consensual homosexual sex, were true, but others were probably invented. The trials were of limited efficacy in their intended purpose of discrediting the Catholic Church. Catholic authorities alternated between reprimanding the guilty and covering up the scandal.

=== Regional and class-based targeting ===
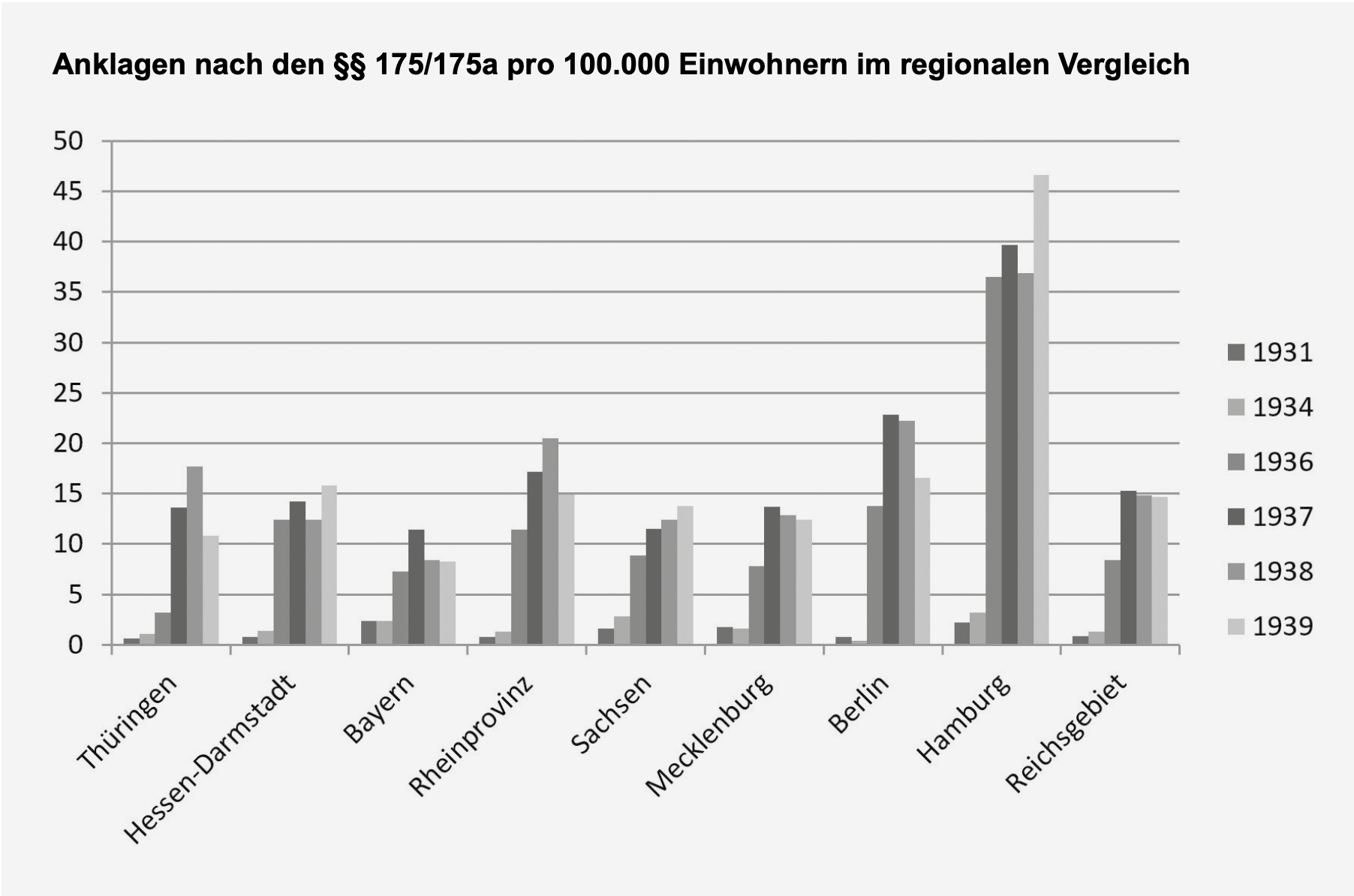
Regional differences in convictions under Paragraph 175 in Germany, 1930s. Hamburg is the highest.

Active policing tactics were mainly limited to the larger cities; in rural areas, the police relied on denunciation. The difference in policing strategy, and likely over-representation and greater visibility of homosexuals in urban areas, led to vastly different conviction rates in different parts of Germany. Convictions in Bavaria and Mecklenburg were below the national average while in Rhine Province, Hamburg, and Berlin, they exceeded the average. Within states, urban areas had more cases than rural areas. Because of the reliance on denunciation in rural areas, a disproportionate number of cases involved child abuse or "youth seduction".

Young and working-class men, who may have been less able to evade the authorities, were over-represented among those who were arrested and prosecuted. Half of the suspects were working-class men and another third came from the lower middle class. In Austria, where working-class homosexuals were traditional targets of criminalization, arrests were extended to the middle class but more egregious behavior was required for a higher-class man to be punished for homosexuality. The first homosexuals to be targeted by the Nazis, prior to the Röhm purge, were also Jewish and left-wing political activists. A considerable number of those persecuted for homosexuality were also targeted for other reasons, for example being Romani, disabled, a sex worker, accused of other criminal offenses, a political opponent of the Nazis, or a deserter.

=== Interrogation and trial ===
After arresting a man, he was presumed to be guilty, especially if there was a history of homosexual acts or a previous conviction. Police would tell his family the reason for his arrest. With a conviction, the victim could expect a complete life breakdown, often including loss of home and job, expulsion from professional organizations, and revocation of awards and doctorates. Harsh interrogations were aimed at forcing the victim to confess to the acts the police believed him guilty of. Austere cells in temporary detention facilities were sufficient to obtain confessions in some cases. Other suspects would crumple in the face of "screams, curses, threats, and endless questions", and some were beaten. Some men were held for weeks with nothing to do but await interrogation, and suffered mental breakdowns. Some men were sent to concentration camps under protective custody either to encourage them to confess, or to incarcerate them when there was not enough evidence to obtain a conviction. The police would tell suspects they would get a lighter punishment if they confessed, and indefinite detention in a concentration camp if they did not.

Both the Gestapo and the Kripo targeted homosexuals, a rivalry that may have encouraged the latter to adopt the more-brutal tactics of the former. Torture was regularly used to extract confessions and the use of "enhanced interrogation" (verschärfte Vernehmung) was explicitly approved of by Josef Meisinger, head of the Reich Central Office for the Combating of Homosexuality and Abortion. After 1936, cases were processed more quickly and the accused rarely had a legal defense. Most had already confessed, guaranteeing a guilty verdict. An unknown number of men who were found unfit to stand trial were confined to psychiatric hospitals.

=== Prisons ===
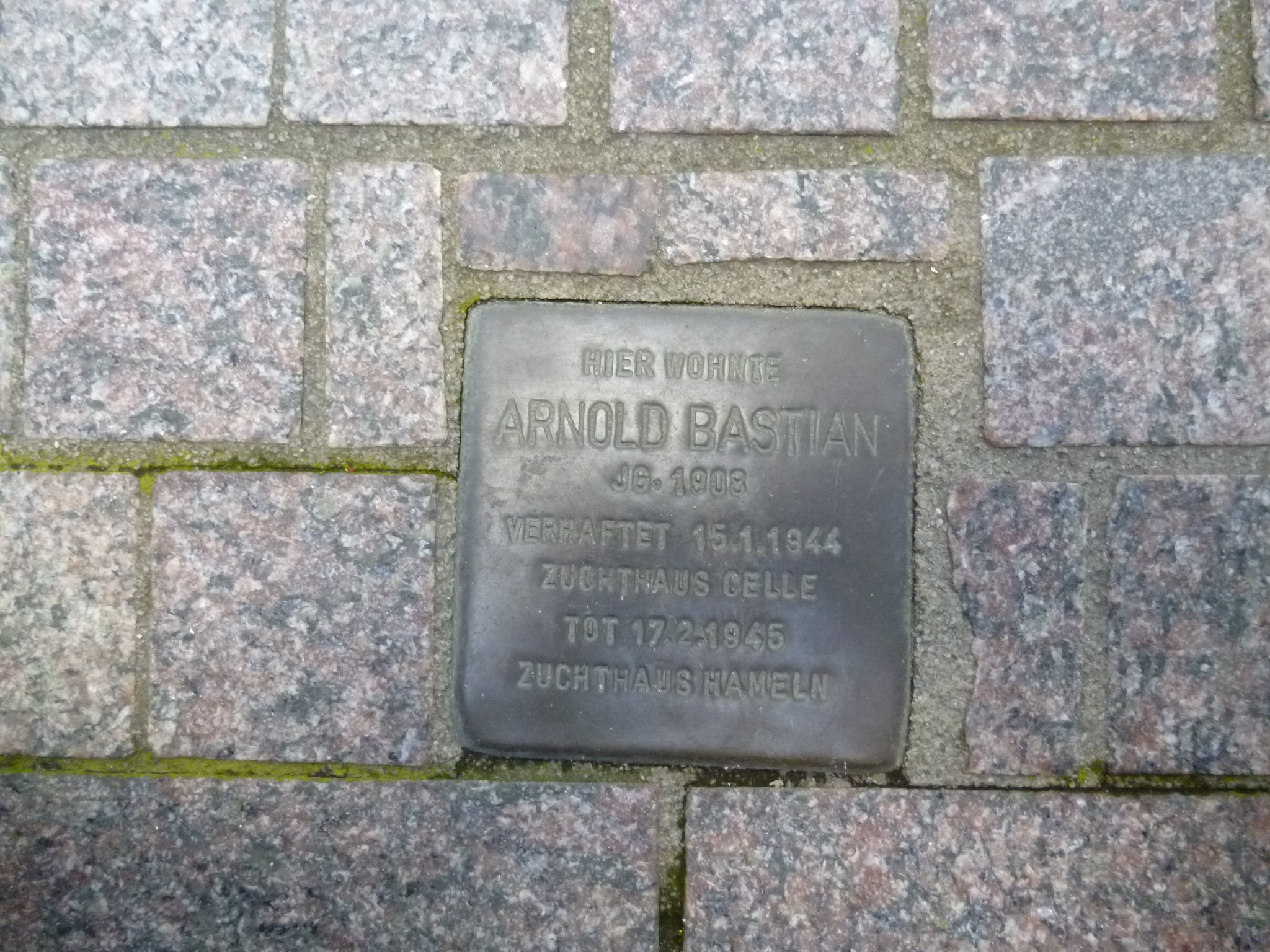
Arnold Bastian (1908–1945) was arrested in 1944 for his homosexuality and died in prison in 1945.

Most men who were persecuted for homosexuality were convicted in the civil legal system and imprisoned. In Germany, it had long been the practice to isolate homosexual prisoners in individual cells but because of the vast increase in arrests, this proved to be impractical. In addition, the economic exploitation of prisoner labor meant many prisoners were held in labor camps and housed in barracks. While some officials built tiny, one-man cells to keep homosexual prisoners isolated, other officials distributed homosexuals among the general prison population and encouraged "brutal homophobia" to isolate homosexuals. Homosexual prisoners did not have to wear a badge but could be identified by red underlining on their name tags.

Before 1933 prison sex had been common but its prevention and punishment became much more important under Nazi rule. Any prisoner who tried to initiate a same-sex relationship, even if it did not result in any physical contact, could expect harsh punishment. The wardens relied on informers among the inmates to deter same-sex activity. Despite facing discrimination, however, homosexual prisoners were much better off in the prisons than in concentration camps.

==== Castration ====
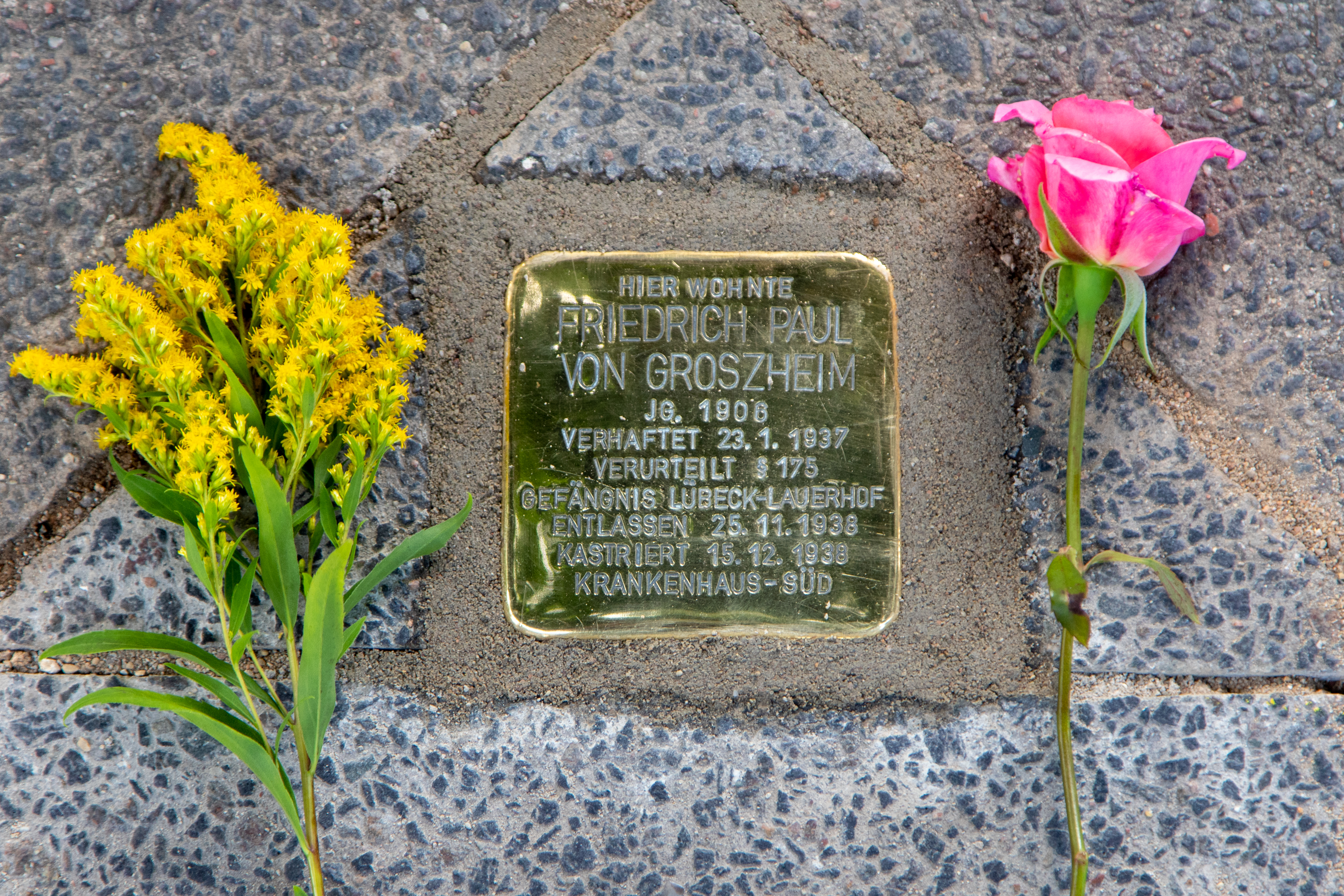
Friedrich-Paul von Groszheim (1908–2006) was spared from a concentration camp after agreeing to castration under pressure in 1938.

In June 1935 the Sterilization Law was amended to allow individual convicted criminals to be "voluntarily" sterilized to eliminate their "degenerate sex drive". During the Nazi era, the regime considered extending the policy of involuntary castration that was previously applied to child molesters and other sex offenders to homosexuals but such a law was never passed. In 1943 Gestapo chief Ernst Kaltenbrunner advocated for a law for involuntary castration of homosexuals and sex offenders but withdrew this request because he believed the Gestapo could ensure castrations were carried out where it desired. Although the fiction of voluntary castration was maintained, some homosexuals were subject to severe pressure and coercion—including the threat of imprisonment in a concentration camp—to agree to castration. An estimated 400 to 800 men and boys—some as young as 16 years—were castrated in this manner.

=== Concentration camps ===
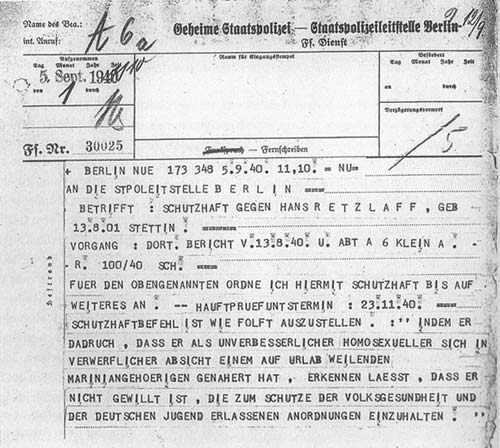
5 September 1940 Gestapo order for the detention of Hans Retzlaff (1901–1940), an "incorrigible homosexual" in Sachsenhausen

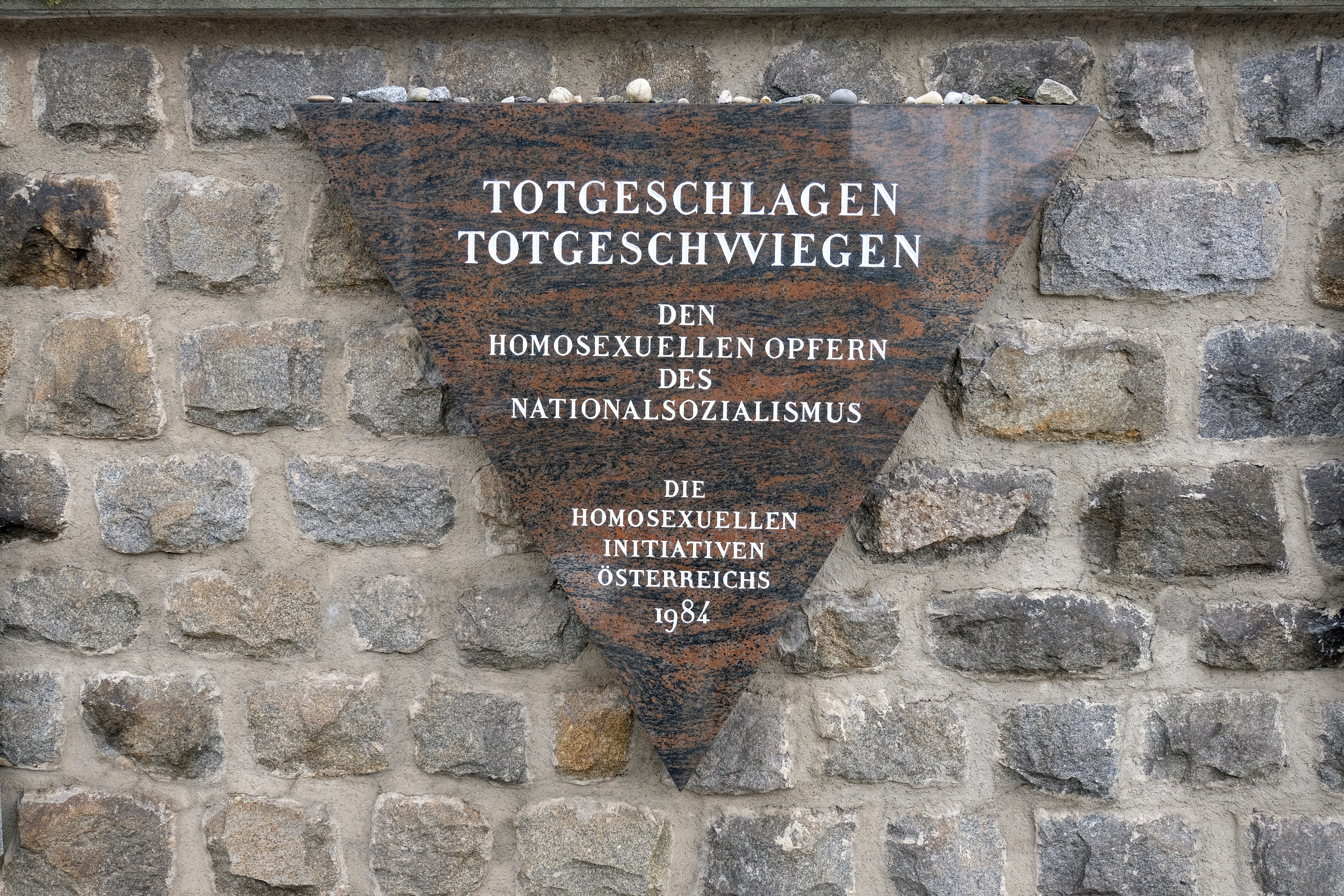
Memorial plaque dedicated to homosexual victims in Mauthausen

Unlike the legal punishment system, prisoners in concentration camps were held in indefinite detention at the mercy of the SS and Gestapo. The use of concentration camp detention for homosexuals began in 1934 and 1935; it was initially seen as a temporary re-education measure. In May 1935, the Prussian police detained 513 accused homosexuals in protective custody. Himmler did not consider a time-limited prison sentence was sufficient to eliminate homosexuality. After 1939, it was a policy to send men who were convicted of multiple homosexual acts to a concentration camp after they served their prison sentences. On 12 July 1940 the Reich Security Main Office formalized this policy, decreeing "in future, all homosexuals who seduced more than one partner shall be taken into preventive custody by the police after their release from prison". According to research in some parts of Germany, non-aggravated homosexuality, as a rule, was not punished with concentration camp imprisonment, which was mostly reserved for those who were considered "youth seducers", or had been convicted of male prostitution or child molestation. In other cases, men who were convicted with homosexuality combined with other criminal offenses or political opposition could be transferred to a concentration camp.

Historian Clayton J. Whisnant states homosexual concentration camp prisoners "experienced some of the worst conditions that humans have ever been forced to endure". In the prewar camps, Jewish and homosexual prisoners ranked at the bottom of the prisoner hierarchy, and homosexual Jews fared the worst. Along with Jews, homosexuals were often assigned to segregated labor details and had to perform especially dirty and backbreaking work, and endured worse conditions than the rest of the camp. Homosexual prisoners rarely benefited from solidarity from other prisoners, even Jews, because of widespread homophobia. Surviving the camps often required either building social networks with other prisoners or being promoted to a position of authority. Homosexuals were disadvantaged in both of these aspects; some younger, more attractive men could obtain advantages from a sexual relationship with a kapo (prison functionary) or SS guard. After 1942, conditions improved because of the need for forced labor, and some homosexual prisoners were promoted because of the influx of non-German prisoners who were ineligible for kapo positions.

About 5,000 to 6,000 homosexual men were imprisoned in the concentration camps. Sociologist Rüdiger Lautmann examined 2,542 known cases of homosexual concentration camp prisoners and determined their death rate was 60 percent, compared with 42 percent of political prisoners and 35 percent of Jehovah's Witnesses. Assuming a death rate of between 53 and 60 percent, at least 3,100 to 3,600 men died in the camps. SS guards murdered homosexual prisoners out of cruelty or during sadistic games, disguising the deaths as natural causes. At camps like Mauthausen and Flossenbürg, it was standard practice to work homosexual prisoners to death. In mid-1942 almost all the homosexual prisoners at Sachsenhausen (at least two hundred) were executed. Many homosexual prisoners at Ravensbrück died at the same time. The chances of survival depended on which camp the men were incarcerated in; Neuengamme was considered less harsh for homosexual prisoners than Buchenwald, Dachau, or Sachsenhausen.

Initially, homosexuals were differentiated from other prisoners with a badge bearing capital letter "A" that was used at Lichtenberg. The standardized Nazi concentration camp badges that included a pink triangle for homosexual prisoners were adopted in 1938.

Homosexual prisoners were a preferred target of Nazi human experimentation during the last years of Nazi rule. The best-known experiments involving homosexual men were attempts by endocrinologist Carl Vaernet to change prisoners' sexual orientations by implanting a pellet that released testosterone. Homosexual and Jewish prisoners were also given experimental treatments for typhus at Buchenwald, for phosphorus burns at Sachsenhausen, and were used for testing opiates and Pervitin.

=== Death penalty ===
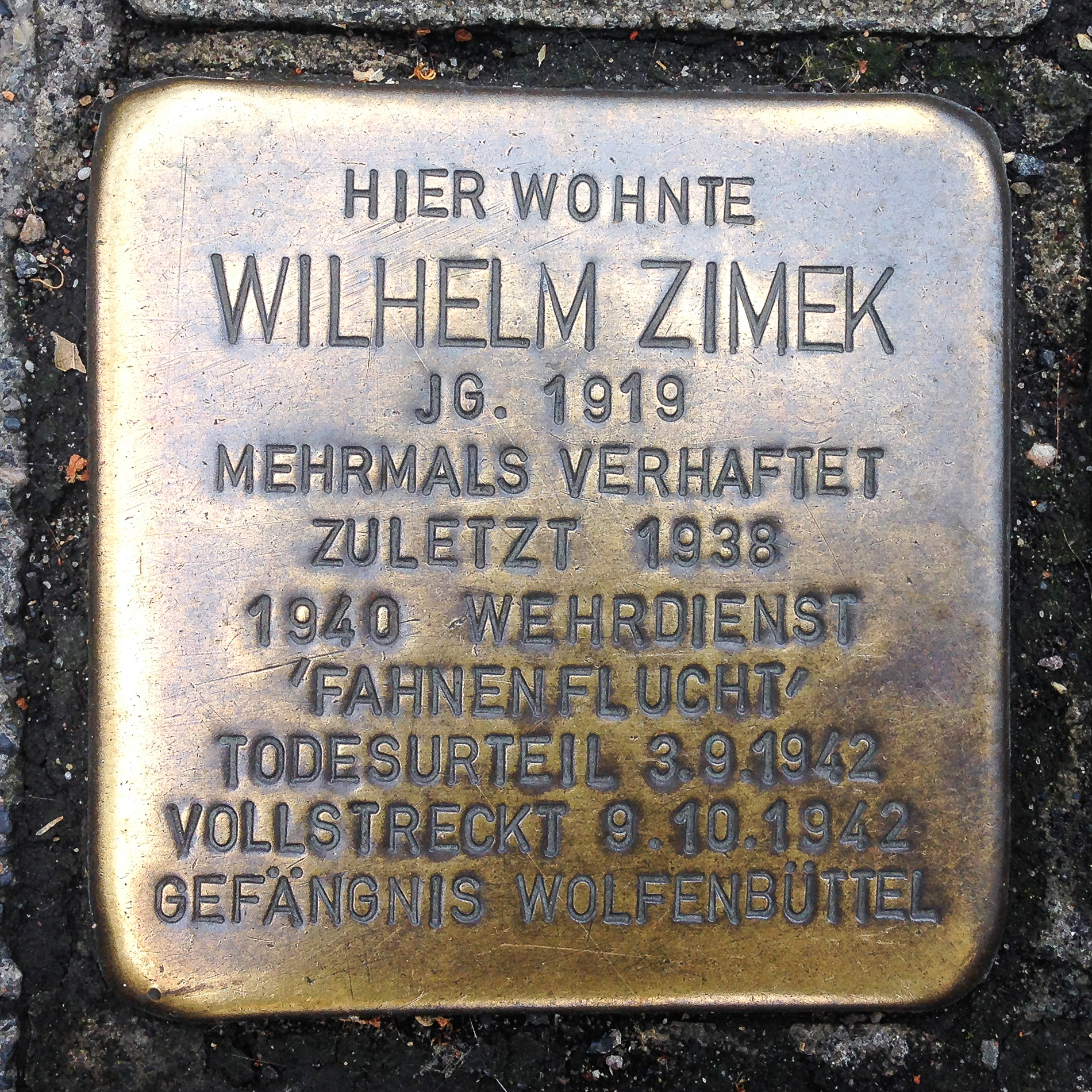
Wilhelm Zimek (1919–1942), persecuted for desertion and homosexuality, executed at Wolfenbüttel Prison

In a 1937 speech Himmler argued SS men who had served sentences for homosexuality should be transferred to a concentration camp and "shot while trying to escape". (Note: A euphemism for the premeditated murder of concentration camp prisoners.) This policy was never implemented, although a few death sentences against SS men for homosexual acts were pronounced between 1937 and 1940. In a speech on 18 August 1941 Hitler argued homosexuality in the Hitler Youth should be punished by death. After learning of Hitler's remark, Himmler drafted a decree mandating the death penalty to any member of the SS or police who was found guilty of engaging in a homosexual act. Hitler, who was worried the decree might encourage left-wing propaganda that homosexuality was especially prevalent in Germany, signed the decree on 15 November 1941 on the condition there was no publicity. After the decree, only a few death sentences were pronounced. Himmler often commuted the sentence, especially if he thought the accused was not a committed homosexual. Many of those whose sentences were commuted were sent to serve in the Dirlewanger Brigade, where most were killed. After late 1943, because of military losses, it was policy to send SS men who were convicted of homosexuality into the army.

The 1933 law on habitual criminals allowed for execution after the third conviction. On 4 September 1941 a new law allowed the execution of dangerous sex offenders and habitual criminals when "the protection of the Volksgemeinschaft or the need for just atonement require it". This law enabled authorities to pronounce death sentences against homosexuals and is known to have been employed in four cases in Austria. In 1943 Wilhelm Keitel authorized the death penalty for German soldiers who were convicted of homosexuality in "particularly serious cases". Only a few such executions are known to have occurred, mostly in conjunction with other charges – especially desertion. Some homosexuals were executed at Nazi euthanasia centers such as Bernburg and Meseritz-Obrawalde. It is difficult to estimate the number of homosexual men who were directly killed during the Nazi era.

== Continued existence ==
Historian Alexander Zinn estimates about one quarter of German homosexual men were investigated during the Nazi era, and that up to one tenth of those were imprisoned. According to Zinn, this rate is evidence of indifference among the general German population towards homosexuality; denunciation of consensual homosexual relations was less common. Zinn said that while all homosexuals in Nazi Germany suffered from the indirect effects of criminalization, their lives cannot be reduced to fear of arrest, and they retained a limited degree of personal freedom. Even before 1933, many homosexual men married women, and the Nazis' rise to power provided an added incentive, although such marriages were usually unhappy. Homosexual desires did not go away; some men sought homosexual contact outside of marriage, risking denunciation by an unhappy wife. Some men organized lavender marriages with lesbians they had known before 1933. Although nearly all homosexuals tried to avoid the attention of the authorities, men continued to find sexual partners at Kreuzberg bathhouses and Münzstrasse movie theaters, and by cruising in places such as Alexanderplatz and the Friedrichstrasse in Berlin. Many suffered from disrupted relationships, loneliness, or loss of self-esteem. A significant number of homosexual and bisexual men, including 25 percent of those persecuted in Hamburg, committed suicide.

According to historian Manfred Herzer, homosexual men and women who avoided persecution "belonged to the willing subjects and beneficiaries of the Nazi state just like other German men and women". The likelihood of being persecuted was lower for those who suppressed their sex lives or served the higher goals of Nazism. Some German homosexuals joined the Nazi Party or fought for Germany during World War II. War and armed service provided an opportunity for sexual encounters with other men, both civilians and members of the armed services. There were also opportunities for sexual assault of other soldiers, subordinates, people from occupied countries, and prisoners. Both might be practiced by men who did not identify as homosexual. During the last years of the war, there were increased opportunities for sexual encounters in bombed-out cities.

In October 1937, Himmler ordered that actors and artists should only be detained for homosexual acts with his authorization, unless they were caught in the act.

== Aftermath ==
Nazi Germany's persecution of homosexuals is considered to be the most-severe episode in a longer history of discrimination and violence against homosexuals; never before or since have so many homosexuals been sentenced to prison in such a short period, even disregarding concentration camp imprisonment. An estimated 100,000 men were arrested and of these, half spent time in prison. Post-war attitudes towards homosexuality were influenced by Nazi propaganda associating homosexuality with criminality and medical illness. Because the various Allied countries considered homosexuality a crime, those prisoners who had not finished serving their sentence under Paragraph 175 had to do so, but those who had never been convicted or who had already served the full time were released. Arrest and incarceration of men for consensual homosexual acts continued to be commonplace in West Germany and Austria through the 1960s; between 1945 and 1969, West Germany convicted about 50,000 men; the same number of men as the Nazis had convicted during their twelve-year rule.

The 1935 version of Paragraph 175 – one of the few Nazi-era laws that remained in force and unaltered in West Germany – was upheld by the Federal Constitutional Court in 1957. In 1962 historian Hans-Joachim Schoeps commented; "For the homosexuals the Third Reich has not yet ended." Although not entirely accurate, this statement captured the view of many West German homosexuals prior to the partial decriminalization in 1969. In East Germany, homosexuality was rarely prosecuted after 1957 and was decriminalized in 1968; the number of convictions there was much lower. Decriminalization did not result in widespread social acceptance, and Paragraph 175 was not repealed until 1994.

=== Recognition as victims of National Socialism ===
Homosexual concentration camp prisoners were not recognized as victims of National Socialism. Just as there was a hierarchy among prisoners in the concentration camps, there was a hierarchy among survivors. Reparations and state pensions available to other groups were refused to gay men, who were still classified as criminals. Political prisoners and persecuted Jews could be disqualified from victim status if they were discovered to be homosexual. In the 1950s Rudolf Klimmer unsuccessfully petitioned the East German government to recognize homosexuals as victims of Nazism and offer them compensation in line with that for other victims. In West Germany in the 1970s activists made similar demands, but these were rejected.

In 1985 the Nazi persecution of homosexuals was officially recognized for the first time in a speech by West German president Richard von Weizsäcker. In 2002, Germany annulled the Nazi-era judgements under Paragraph 175, and in 2017, victims were offered compensation. The 2017 annulment of judgements and compensation extended to men who were convicted after 1945, making this the only case in which the German state offered reparations for acts not considered "typical Nazi injustice" that would not be possible in a democratic state.

== Legacy ==
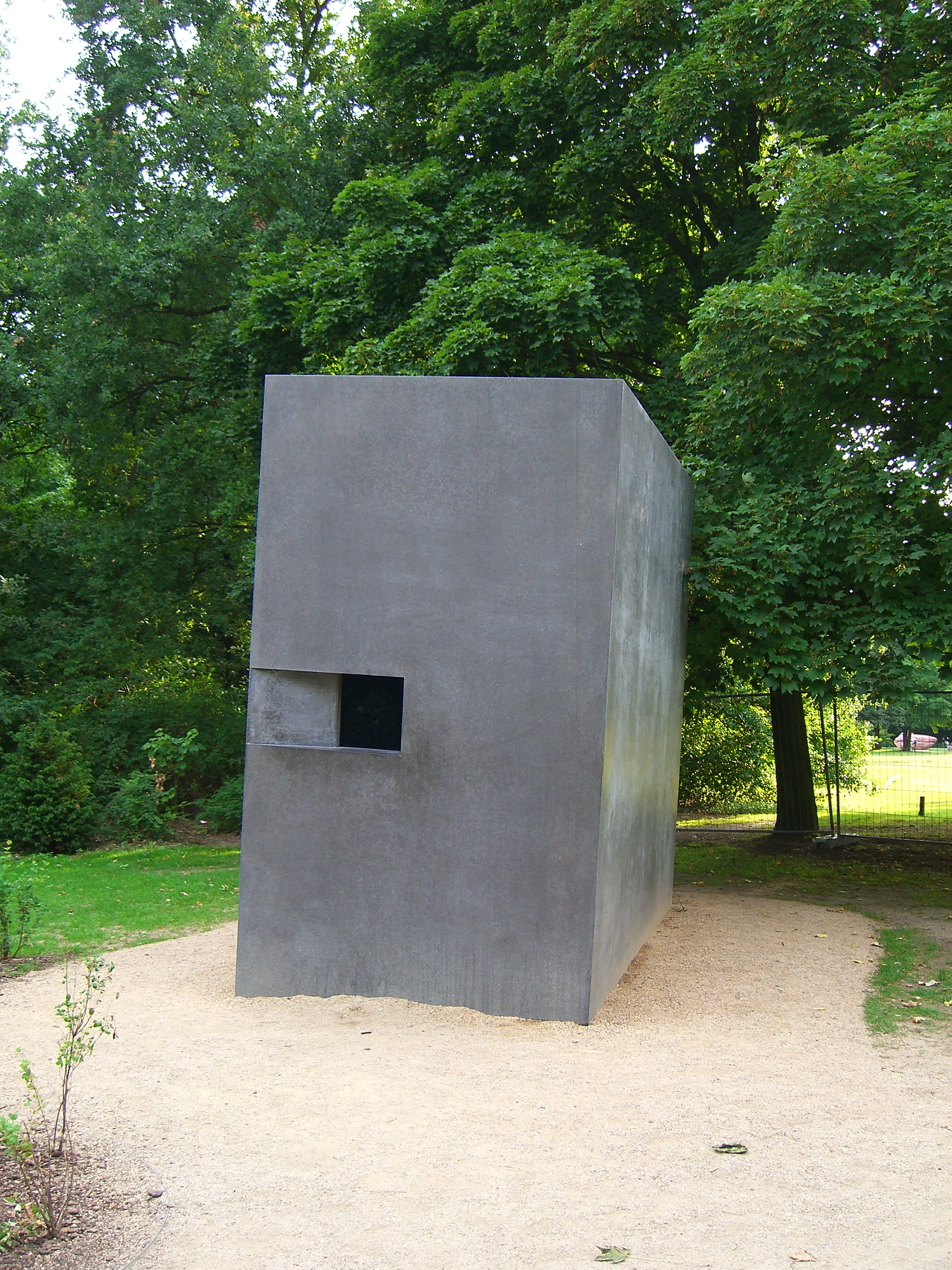
Berlin's Memorial to Homosexuals Persecuted Under Nazism in Tiergarten Park

The memory of the Nazi persecution of homosexuals served as a rallying cry against police tactics used against gay men in the United States, although memory of the concentration camps resurfaced later, in the post-Stonewall era when the homosexual movement exploded. This awareness began in the United States and was later adopted by German homosexual activists. The term "Homocaust" came into use shortly after "Holocaust" in the gay liberation era of the 1970s; activists claimed there had been 250,000 deaths but historical research soon refuted this number. Martin Sherman's 1979 play Bent brought additional attention of the Nazi persecution of homosexuals in English-speaking countries. The pink triangle became one of the most-prominent symbols of gay liberation in the United States. Activists use the symbol to connect Nazi persecution to present-day discrimination and violence against LGBT people, and to mobilize opposition against it.

The practice of laying memorial wreaths in concentration camps in memory of homosexual victims began in the 1970s. Permanent memorials were added to several concentration camps, including Mauthausen (1984), Sachsenhausen (1992), Dachau (1995), and Buchenwald (2002). This memorialization encountered strong resistance from established survivor associations. Memorials have also been constructed in several German cities, such as Frankfurt (1994), Cologne (1995), Berlin (2008), and Lübeck (2016). Memorials to Nazi persecution of homosexuals have also been constructed in Amsterdam, Bologna, Turin, Barcelona, San Francisco, New York, Montevideo, Sydney, and Tel Aviv. Hundreds of Stolpersteine have been installed to commemorate individual victims of the Nazis' anti-homosexual persecution. In the United States there was less emphasis on memorialization and more explicit comparisons between the Jewish Holocaust and persecution of homosexuals. German gay activists tended to see a close parallel to the Nazi persecution of communists and socialists.

Sources attesting to the Nazi persecution of homosexuals are scarce. Most homosexuals, especially those who avoided arrest, never spoke about their experiences. The Nazis destroyed a great number of records, including the archive of the Reich Central Office for the Combating of Homosexuality and Abortion. Remaining sources are mainly in the form of police and court records. In 1972 concentration camp survivor Josef Kohout published his memoir, The Men With the Pink Triangle, which is one of few accounts from a pink-triangle prisoner. The first historical research appeared at the end of the 1970s.

== See also ==
- Transgender people in Nazi Germany
- Violence against LGBTQ people
- Heteronationalism
