= Frankfurter Engel =

Memorial to homosexual victims during Nazi Germany

Coordinates: 50°07′00.5″N 8°41′06.9″E

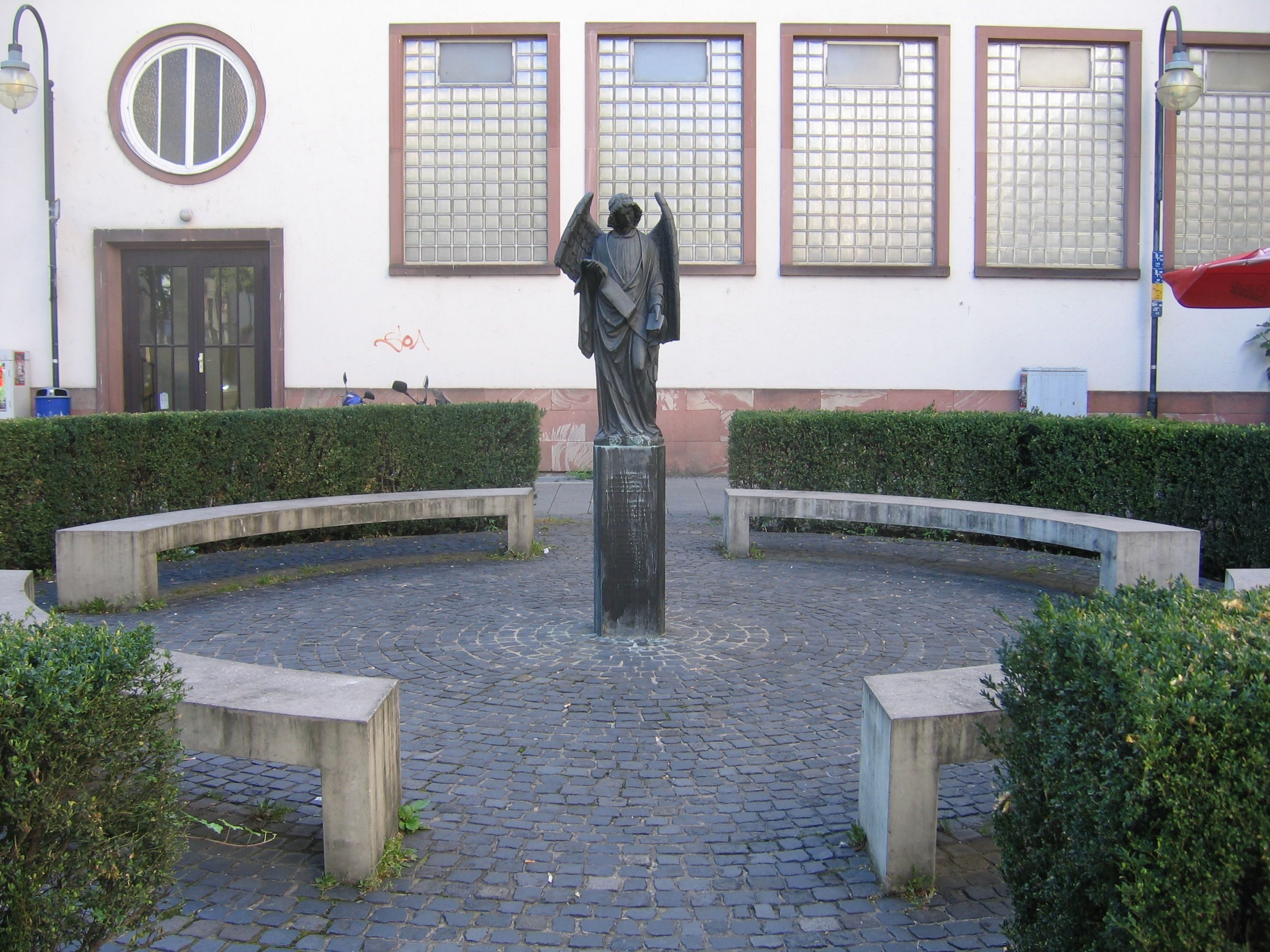
Frankfurter angel in Frankfurt am Main

The Frankfurter Engel (German for Frankfurt angel) is a memorial in the city of Frankfurt am Main in southwestern Germany; it is dedicated to homosexual people who were persecuted under Nazi rule, and as well as under Paragraph 175 of the German Criminal Code during the 1950s and 1960s.

== Design ==
The memorial is a statue of an angel and is the first of its kind in Germany. Subsequent memorials in Germany are Kölner Rosa Winkel (1995) in Cologne and Memorial to Homosexuals persecuted under Nazism (2008) in Berlin.

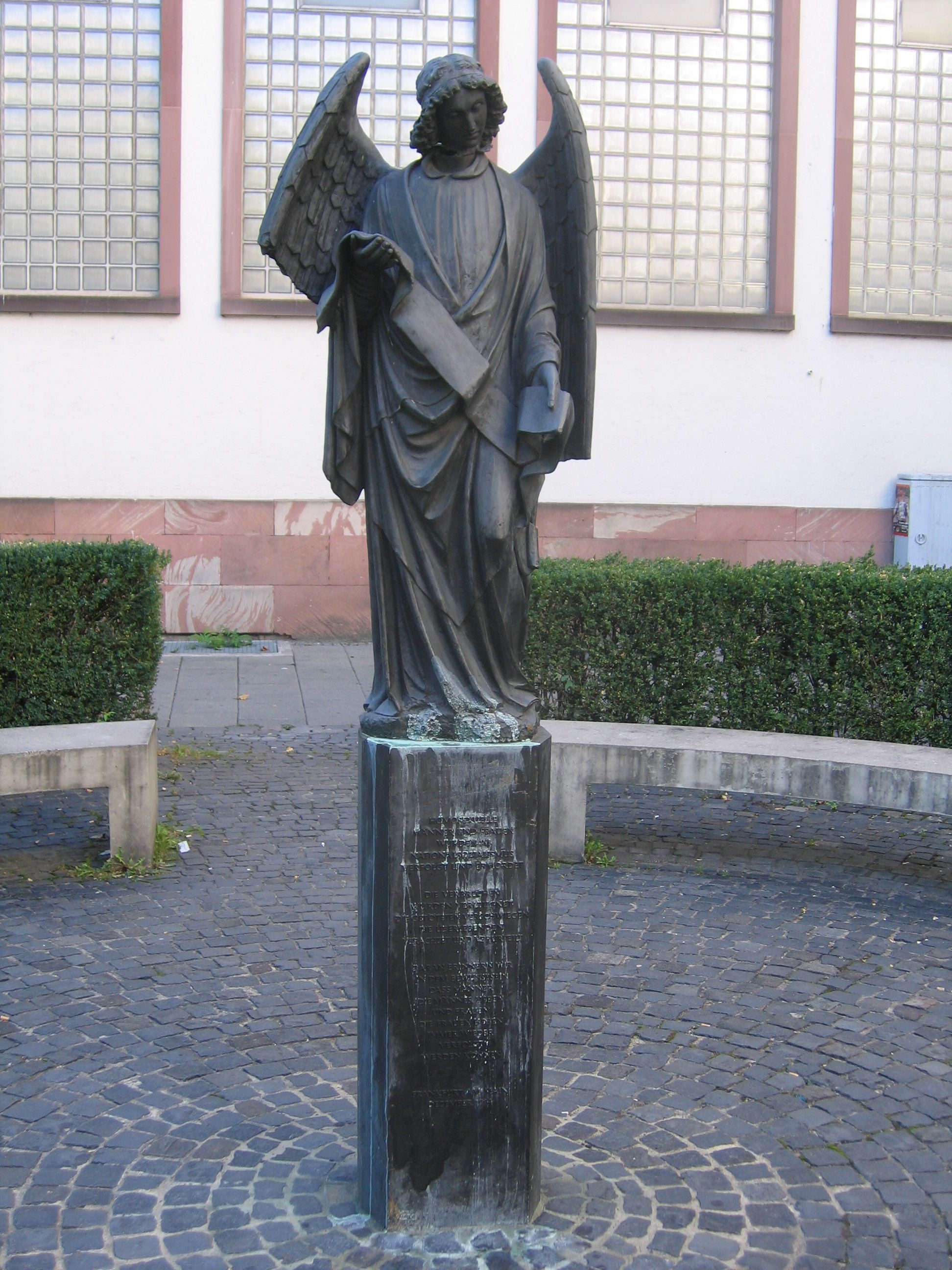
Frankfurter angel by Rosemarie Trockel

At the base of the memorial, written in German, is:

Homosexuelle Männer und Frauen wurden im Nationalsozialismus verfolgt und ermordet. Die Verbrechen wurden geleugnet, die Getöteten verschwiegen, die Überlebenden verachtet und verurteilt. Daran erinnern wir in dem Bewusstsein, dass Männer, die Männer lieben, und Frauen, die Frauen lieben, immer wieder verfolgt werden können. Frankfurt am Main. Dezember 1994

This can be translated to English as:

Homosexual men and women were persecuted and murdered in Nazi Germany. The crimes were denied, the dead concealed, the survivors scorned and prosecuted. We remember this, in the awareness that men who love men and women who love women still face persecution. Frankfurt am Main. December 1994.

The memorial honors homosexuals who were persecuted and/or died during the Nazi rule and Paragraph 175 of the German Criminal Code that outlawed homosexuality during the 1950s and 1960s. It was reformed in 1969 and fully repealed in 1973.

== History ==
On 20 July 1992 a competition for the memorial design began. Ultimately, the winner of the competition was the artist Rosemarie Trockel, and the memorial was built at the crossing of the streets Schäfergasse and Alte Gasse. On 11 December 1994 the memorial was opened.

== See also ==
- History of gay men in Nazi Germany and the Holocaust
- List of LGBT monuments and memorials

== Literature ==
- Rüdiger Lautmann. Nationalsozialistischer Terror gegen Homosexuelle. Verdrängt und ungesühnt. (together with Burkhard Jellonnek): Paderborn: Schöningh. 2002. ISBN 3-506-74204-3
