= Memorial to Homosexuals Persecuted Under Nazism =

Memorial in Berlin, Germany

Coordinates: 52°30′47.71″N 13°22′34.74″E

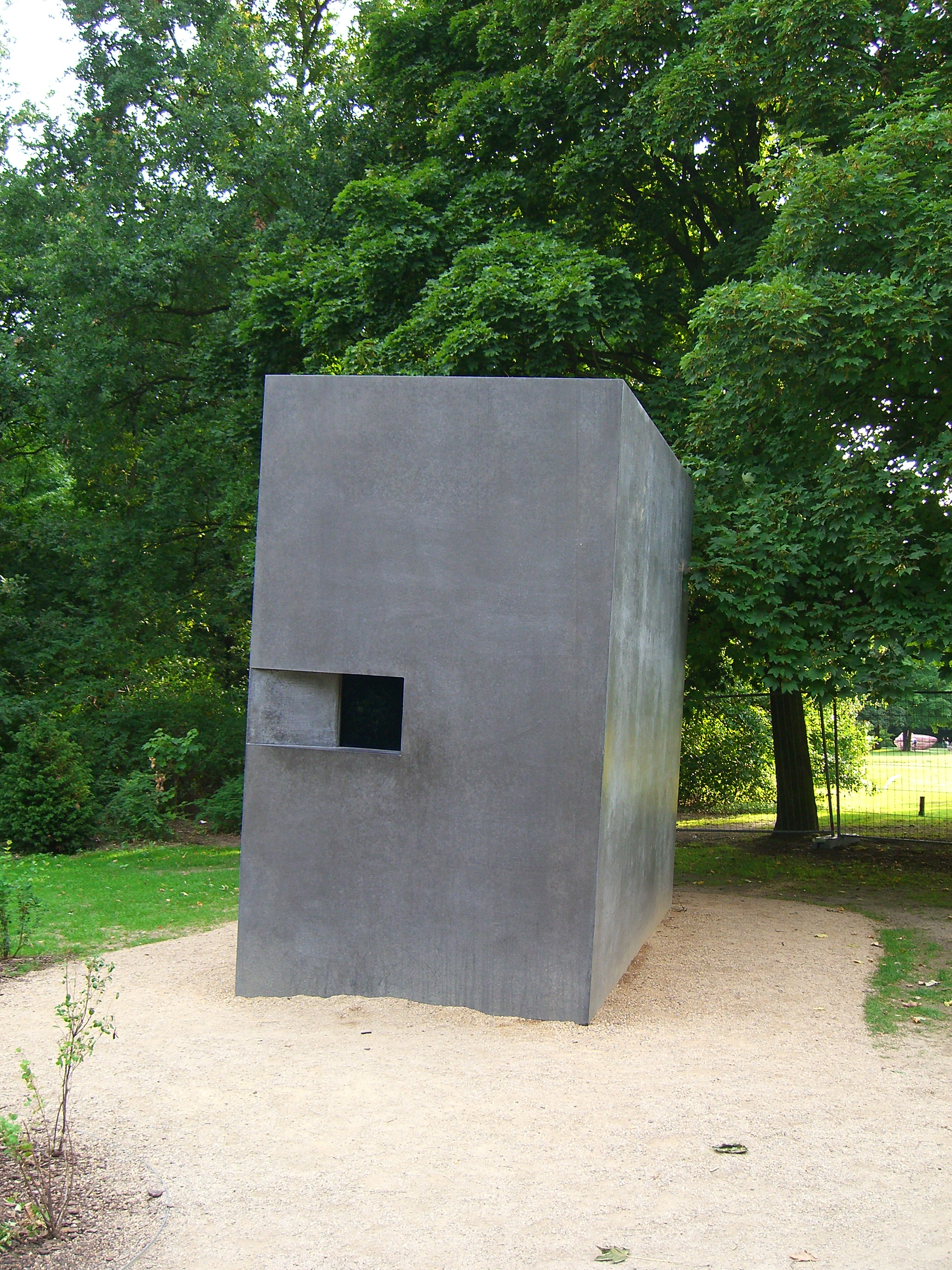
The front of the memorial

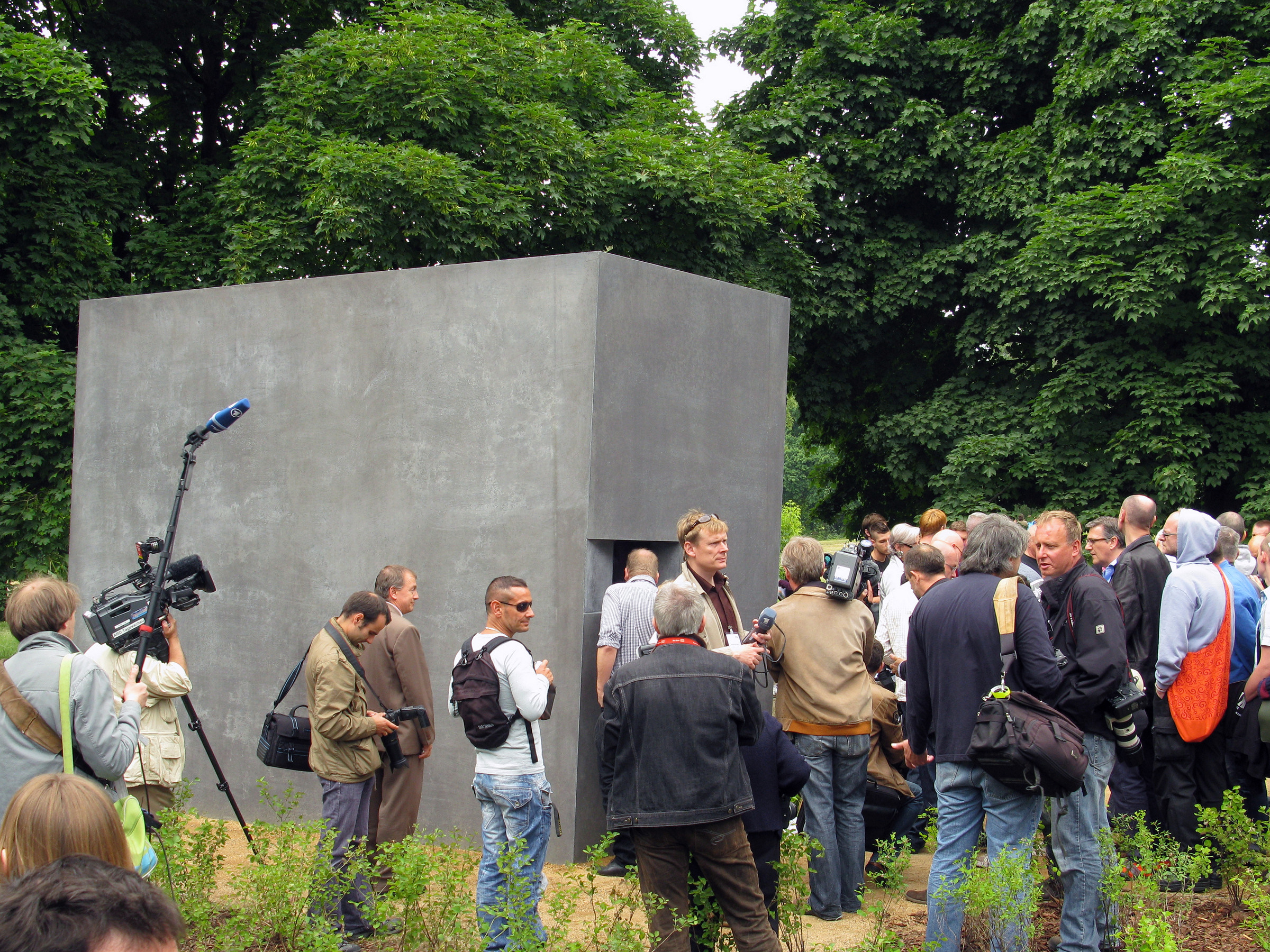
The opening of the memorial, 27 May 2008

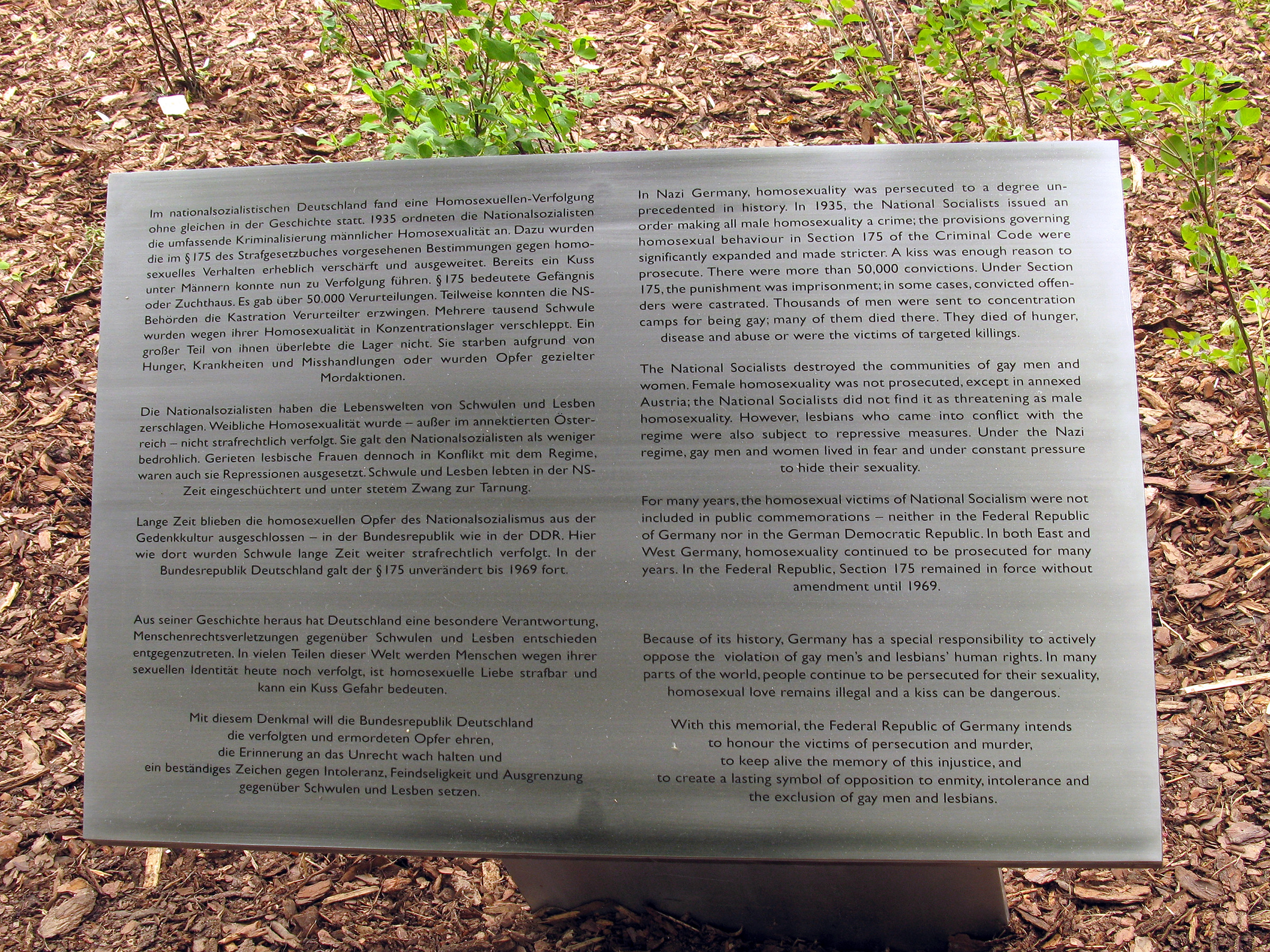
Signboard

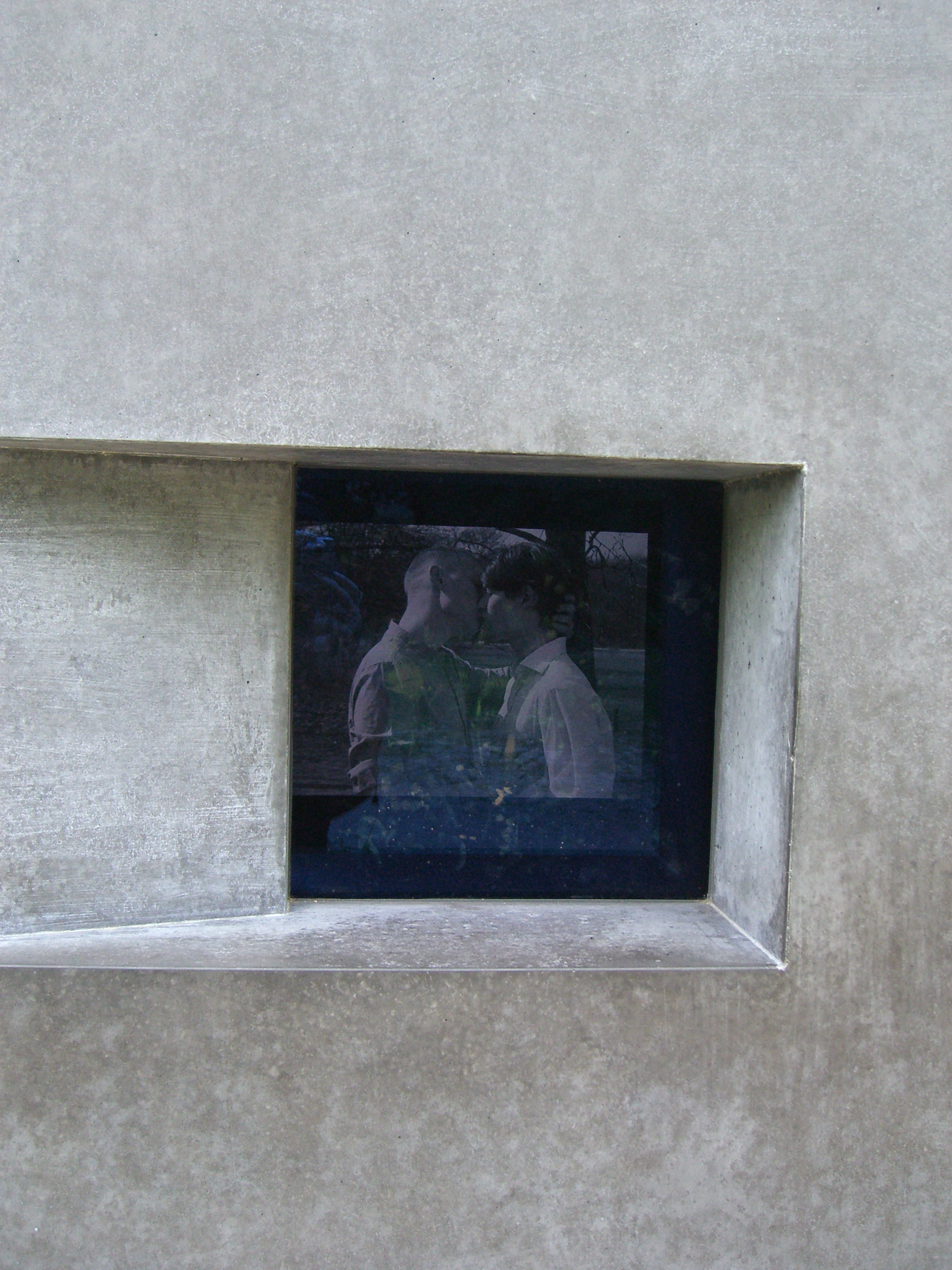
Video in memorial

The Memorial to Homosexuals persecuted under Nazism (German: Denkmal für die im Nationalsozialismus verfolgten Homosexuellen) in Berlin was opened on 27 May 2008.

== Design ==
The memorial was designed by artists Michael Elmgreen and Ingar Dragset.

The cuboid is made of concrete. On the front side of the cuboid is a window, through which visitors can see a short film of two kissing men. The work is the third of its kind in Germany following Frankfurter Engel (1994) in Frankfurt and Kölner Rosa Winkel (1995) in Cologne.

The memorial was discussed by all parties in the Bundestag, which granted permission in 2003.

Near the memorial is a signboard, which is written in German and English. There visitors can read over persecutions during Nazism and under Paragraph 175, the law during the 1950s and 1960s that outlawed homosexuality. It was reformed in 1969, attenuated in 1973 and finally voided in 1994.

== History ==
Gay victims of Nazism were not officially recognised in the immediate aftermath of the Third Reich – Paragraph 175 remained part of the German penal code during the 1950s and 1960s. In the 1980s, these "forgotten victims" were finally discussed. In 1985, for instance, president Richard von Weizsäcker remembered homosexuals as a "victim group". The group Der homosexuellen NS-Opfer gedenken and the organization Lesben- und Schwulenverband began promoting a memorial in Berlin in 1993.

On 12 December 2003, the Bundestag approved the erection of a memorial in Berlin at the boundary of Tiergarten (near the Memorial to the Murdered Jews of Europe). Then the competition for artists started.

Politicians attending the 27 May 2008 dedication included Berlin's Mayor Klaus Wowereit, President of the Bundestag Wolfgang Thierse, German Culture Minister Bernd Neumann, Volker Beck and Renate Künast. Mayor Wowereit gave the opening speech for the memorial. Following its dedication, it was frequently vandalized that year.

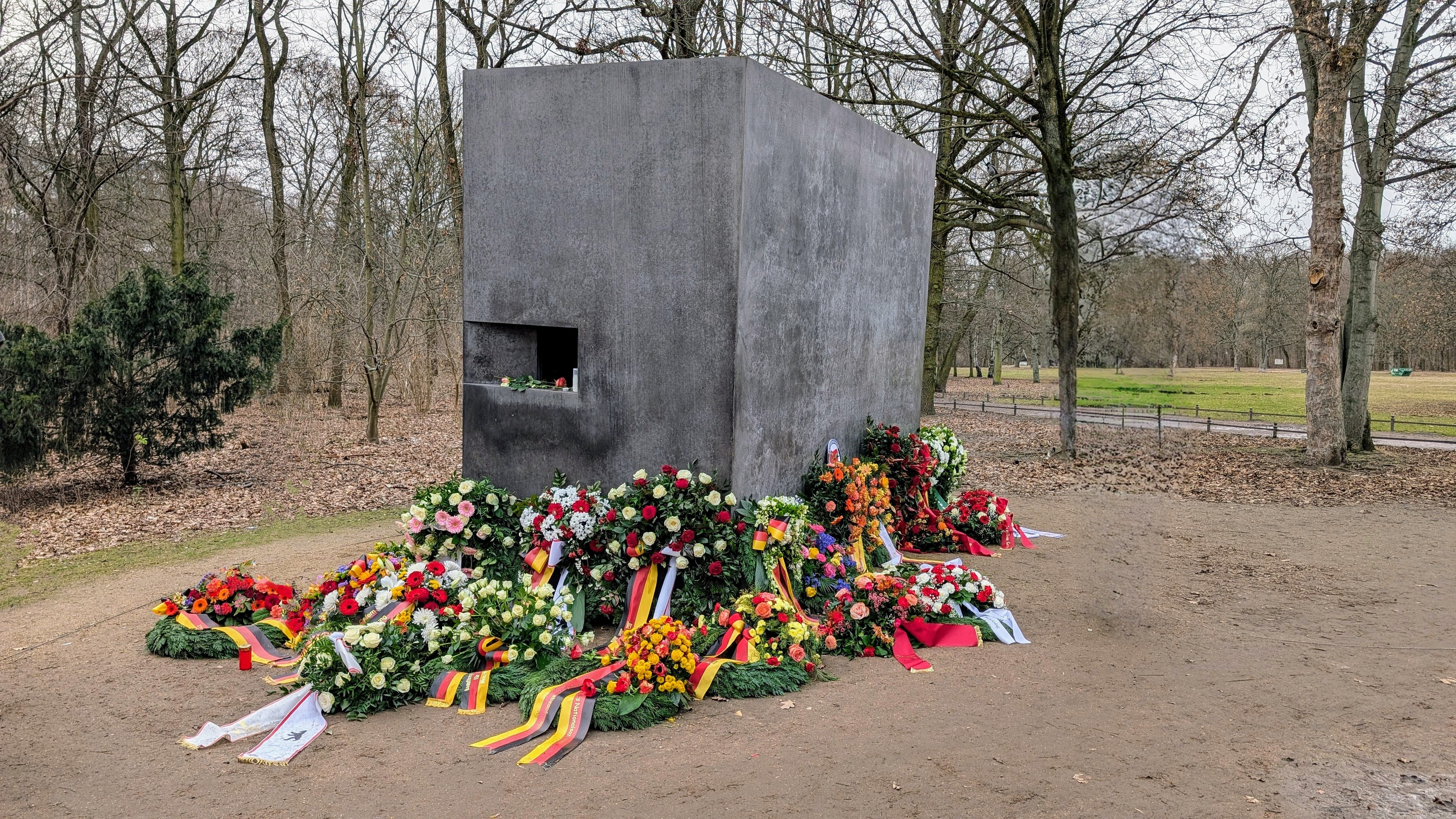
Memorial to the homosexuals persecuted under National Socialism (with wreaths) the day after the commemoration ceremony (29.1.25)

== Controversies ==
After the competition for an artist, which Michael Elmgreen and Ingar Dragset won, a discussion was held regarding the video, specifically whether to include lesbians kissing. Lesbians victimized under Nazism have not been documented, though there are instances recorded of lesbian pubs in cities like Berlin which were lost. The feminist magazine EMMA protested that the memorial should also be for persecuted lesbian women. As result of the discussion, the video will be changed every two years and will also show kissing lesbians.

In 2008, the Holocaust survivor and historian Israel Gutman questioned its location near the Jewish Holocaust Memorial, as he felt the scale of the persecution of homosexuals should not be compared with that of Jews.

== Literature ==
- Rüdiger Lautmann. Nationalsozialistischer Terror gegen Homosexuelle. Verdrängt und ungesühnt: Paderborn: Schöningh. 2002. ISBN 3-506-74204-3
- Susanne Buckley-Zistel & Annika Björkdahl. Memorials and Transitional Justice, in Olivera Simic (ed.): Understanding Transitional Justice. Routledge, 2017, pp. 249–268.
- Anika Oettler. Das Berliner Denkmal für die im Nationalsozialismus verfolgten Homosexuellen. Entstehung, Verortung, Wirkung. Transcript Verlag, 2017.

== See also ==
- History of gay men in Nazi Germany and the Holocaust
- List of LGBT monuments and memorials
- Pink triangle
