= Memorial to gay and lesbian victims of National Socialism =

Memorial of LGBT victims of Nazi Germany

Coordinates: 50.94092°N 6.962619°E

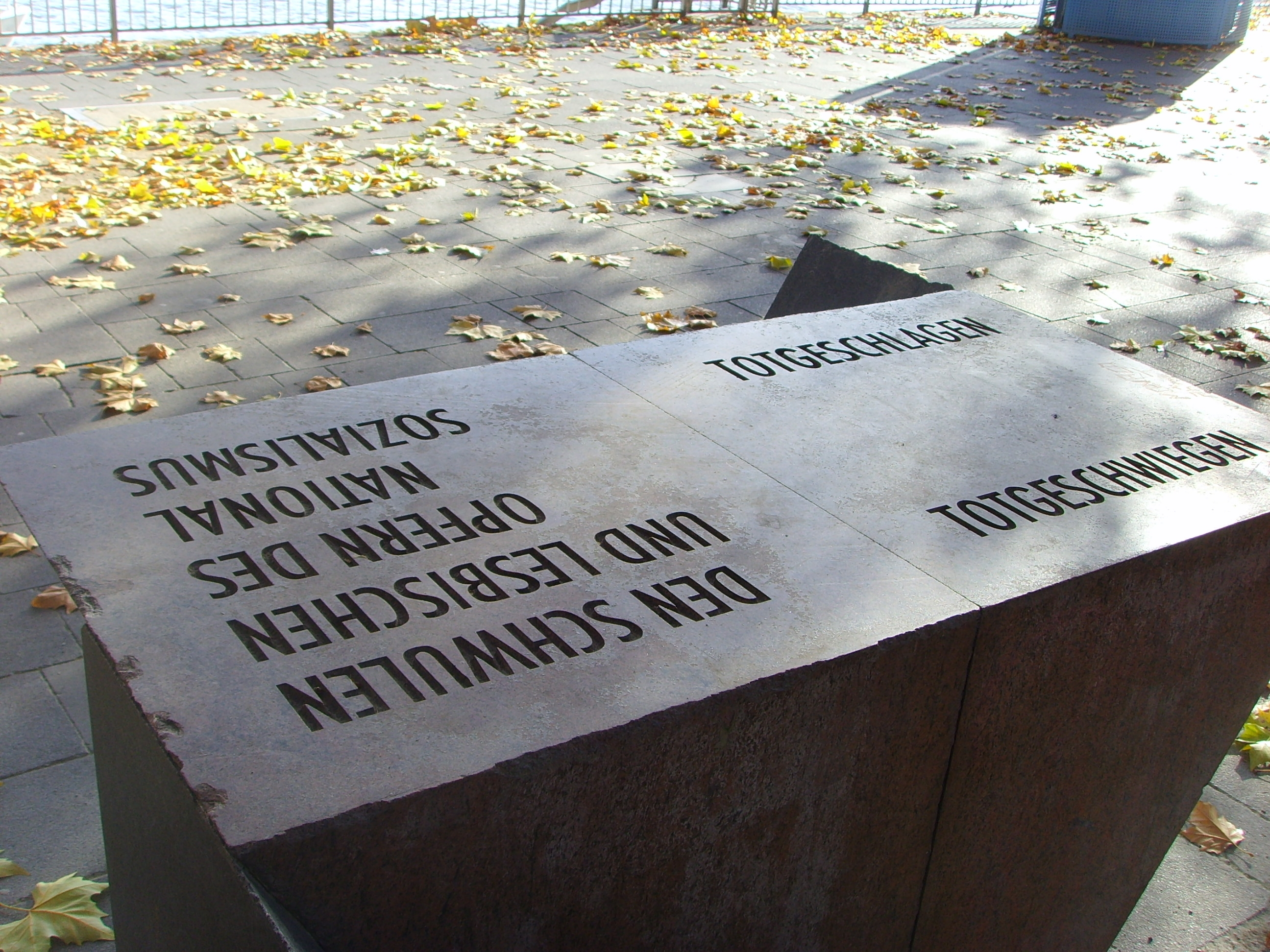
Engraving on the memorial.

The memorial to gay and lesbian victims of National Socialism (also known as the FEZ memorial) is a monument in Cologne, Germany, dedicated to the gay and lesbian victims of the Nazis.

The memorial, dedicated on 24 June 1995, is located next to the Hohenzollern Bridge, on the bank of the Rhine. The site was chosen for its historical significance: Traditionally, the bridge was a popular meeting place for gay men who wanted to have anonymous sexual contacts.

== History ==
The study group "Dykes and Queers", led by Jörg Lenk, proposed the memorial in March 1990. The official applicant was the Federation of German Trade Unions' Cologne chapter, backed publicly by various individuals and organizations.

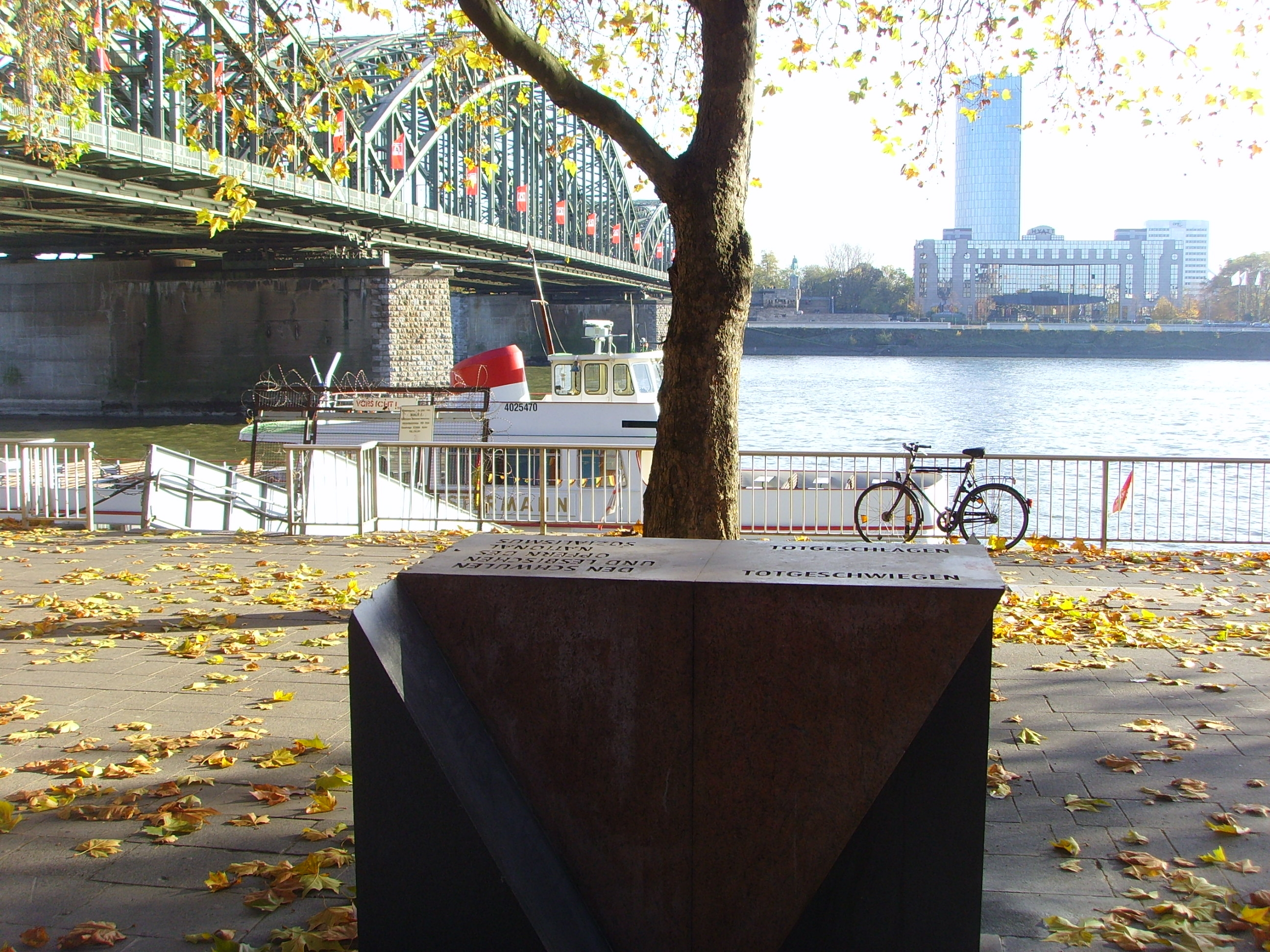
A view of the Rhine and the Hohenzollern Bridge from the memorial.

The Cologne Office for Cultural Affairs proposed 25 possible artists in 1993. Eleven design proposals were submitted, and an independent jury decided unanimously in 1994 in favour of Achim Zinkann, a sculptor from Rostock who had taught art and history at the University of Siegen. The project was funded by 30,900 marks (€15,798) in donations. The opening ceremony took place on 24 June 1995, coinciding both with Cologne's gay pride celebration and with the 50th anniversary of the liberation of Germany from Nazi rule.

Similar monuments exist in Frankfurt (the Frankfurt Angel memorial, opened 11 December 1994) and in Berlin (opened 27 May 2008). Plaques and panels have also been installed at the sites of the Mauthausen, Neuengamme, Dachau, and Sachsenhausen concentration camps.

== Design ==
The memorial consists of pink and grey granite. It is 120 cm (~47 inches) high and 69 cm (~27 inches) wide. Its shape is similar to the pink triangle used by the Nazis to identify gay men in concentration camps.

The text on the memorial reads "Killed — Silenced: To the gay and lesbian victims of National Socialism."

== See also ==
- List of LGBT monuments and memorials
- List of people executed for homosexuality in Europe
- List of LGBT rights activists
- Cologne Pride

== Literature ==
- Limpricht/Müller/Oxenius. Verführte Männer — Das Leben der Kölner Homosexuellen im Dritten Reich, Köln 1991
- Centrum Schwule Geschichte Köln. «Das sind Volksfeinde» — Die Verfolgung von Homosexuellen an Rhein und Ruhr 1933-45, Köln 1998
- Jürgen Müller. Ausgrenzung der Homosexuellen aus der «Volksgemeinschaft» — Die Verfolgung von Homosexuellen in Köln 1933—1945, Köln 2003
- Claudia Schoppmann. Verbotene Verhältnisse — Frauenliebe 1938—1945, Berlin 1999
- Burkhard Jellonnek, Rüdiger Lautmann. Nationalsozialistischer Terror gegen Homosexuelle — Verdrängt und ungesühnt, Paderborn 2002
- Pierre Seel. Ich, Pierre Seel, deportiert und vergessen, Köln 1996
- Stümke-Winkler. Rosa Winkel, Rosa Listen, Hamburg 1981
- Frank Sparing. «Wegen Vergehen nach § 175 verhaftet» — Die Verfolgung der Düsseldorfer Homosexuellen, Düsseldorf 1997
