= Rüdiger Lautmann =

German sociologist (born 1935)

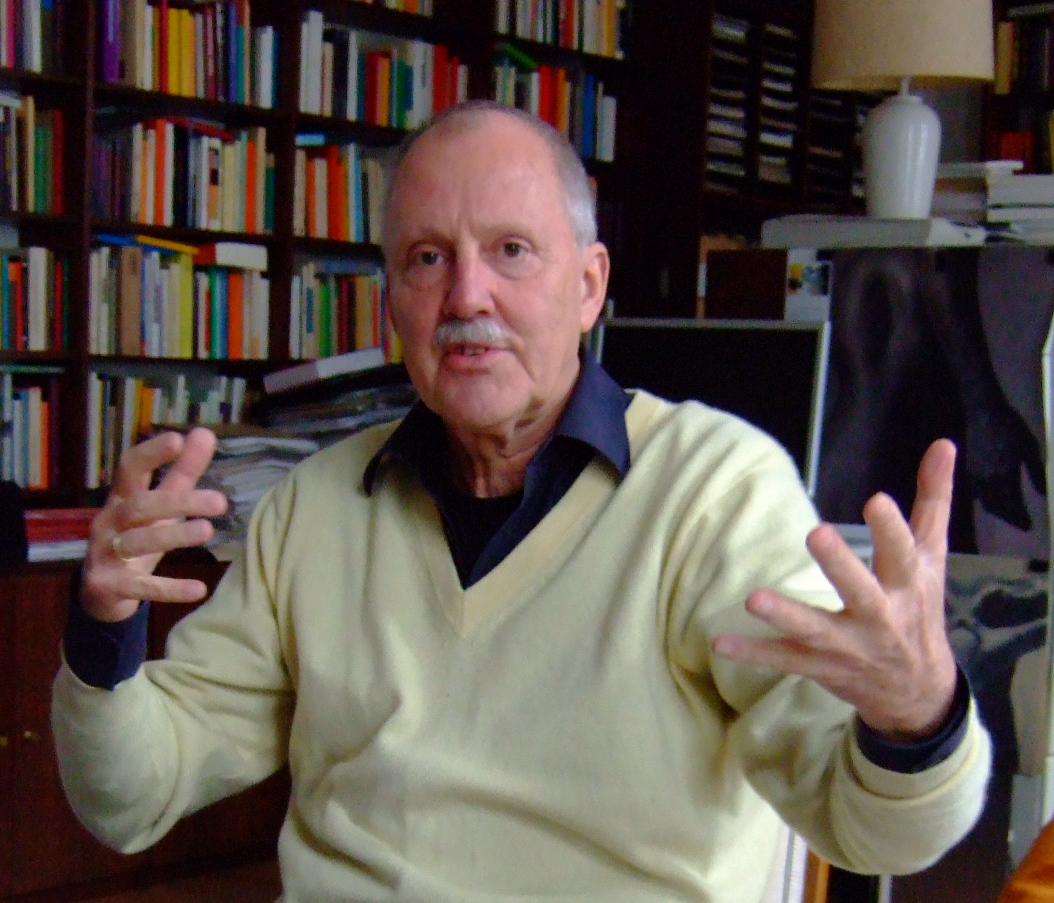
Lautmann in his Hamburg study in 2008

Rüdiger Lautmann (born 22 December 1935) is a German professor of sociology and a LGBT scholar in Germany. His 1994 book, Die Lust am Kind, is often touted by pro-pedophile activists; he has since distanced himself from this book in response to public criticism in Germany.

== Biography ==
Born in Koblenz, Lautmann lived during his childhood in Düsseldorf, where he went to school. He first studied German law. After he finished his law studies, he started a second study in sociology. Lautmann worked after university studies first in Münster and then in Bielefeld (for Niklas Luhmann). In 1971, he became then professor in sociology at University of Bremen. In 2001, Lautmann retired as professor.

In 2005, Lautmann married his boyfriend in Hamburg. There he leads the Institut für Sicherheits- und Präventionsforschung. In 2009 he moved to Berlin.

== Works ==
- Die Funktion des Rechts in der modernen Gesellschaft (together with Werner Maihofer and Helmut Schelsky): Jahrbuch für Rechtssoziologie und Rechtstheorie, First Ed., Bielefeld: Bertelsmann. 1970.
- Die Polizei. Soziologische Studien und Forschungsberichte (together with Johannes Feest): Opladen. 1971.
- Justiz – die stille Gewalt. Teilnehmende Beobachtung und entscheidungssoziologische Analyse. Frankfurt/Main 1972.
- Lexikon zur Soziologie (together with Werner Fuchs). Opladen: Westdeutscher Verlag. 1973; 3. Ed. 1994. ISBN 3-531-11417-4; 4. Ed. 2002/2003.
- Sozialwissenschaftliche Studien zur Homosexualität. Berlin: Verlag rosa Winkel. 1980 to 1997.
- Der Zwang zur Tugend. Die gesellschaftliche Kontrolle der Sexualitäten. Frankfurt/Main: Suhrkamp. 1984.
- Das pornographierte Begehren (with Michael Schetsche). Frankfurt/New York 1990.
- Homosexualität. Handbuch der Theorie- und Forschungsgeschichte, Frankfurt/Main: Campus. 1993.
- Die Lust am Kind. Portrait des Pädophilen, Hamburg: Ingrid Klein Verlag GmbH. 1994. ISBN 3-89521-015-3
- Nationalsozialistischer Terror gegen Homosexuelle. Verdrängt und ungesühnt (together with Burkhard Jellonnek): Paderborn: Schöningh. 2002. ISBN 3-506-74204-3
