= Nazi concentration camp badge =

Cloth emblems; part of the system of identification in Nazi camps

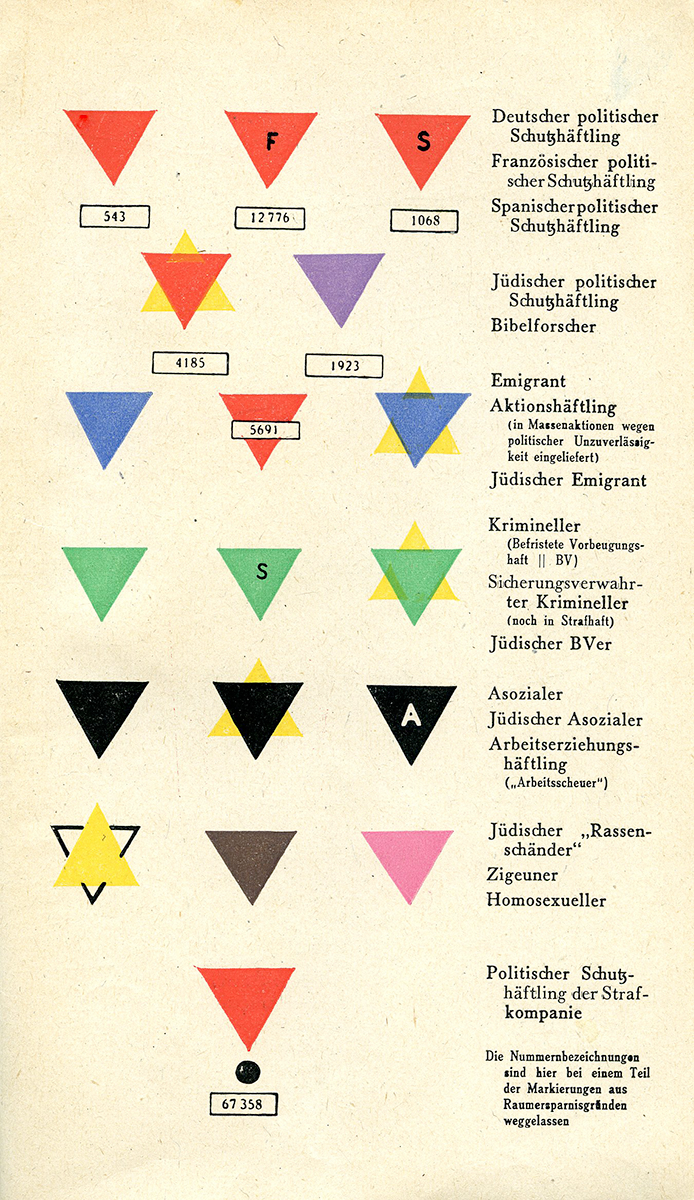
Schematic of the triangle-based badge system in use at most Nazi concentration camps.

Badges, primarily triangles, were used in Nazi concentration camps in German-occupied countries to identify the reason the prisoners were there. The triangles were made of fabric and were sewn onto the prisoners' jackets and trousers. These were mandatory and intended as badges of shame. They had specific meanings indicated by their colour and shape. Guards used such emblems to assign tasks to the detainees. For example, a guard, at a glance, could see if someone was a convicted criminal (green patch) and might assume they had a tough temperament suitable for kapo duty.

Someone wearing a badge indicating a suspected escape attempt was usually not assigned to work squads operating outside the camp fence. Someone wearing an "F" could be called upon to help translate a guard's spoken instructions to a trainload of new arrivals from France. Some historical monuments quote the badge-imagery, with the use of a triangle being a visual shorthand to symbolise all camp victims.

The modern-day use of a pink triangle emblem to symbolise gay rights is a response to the camp identification patches. The black, blue, purple, and red triangles have also been reclaimed by various remembrance and anti-fascist groups, particularly in Europe. Such groups include the Association of Persecutees of the Nazi Regime – Federation of Antifascists (VVN-BdA) in Germany and other members of the International Federation of Resistance Fighters – Association of Anti-Fascists (FIR).

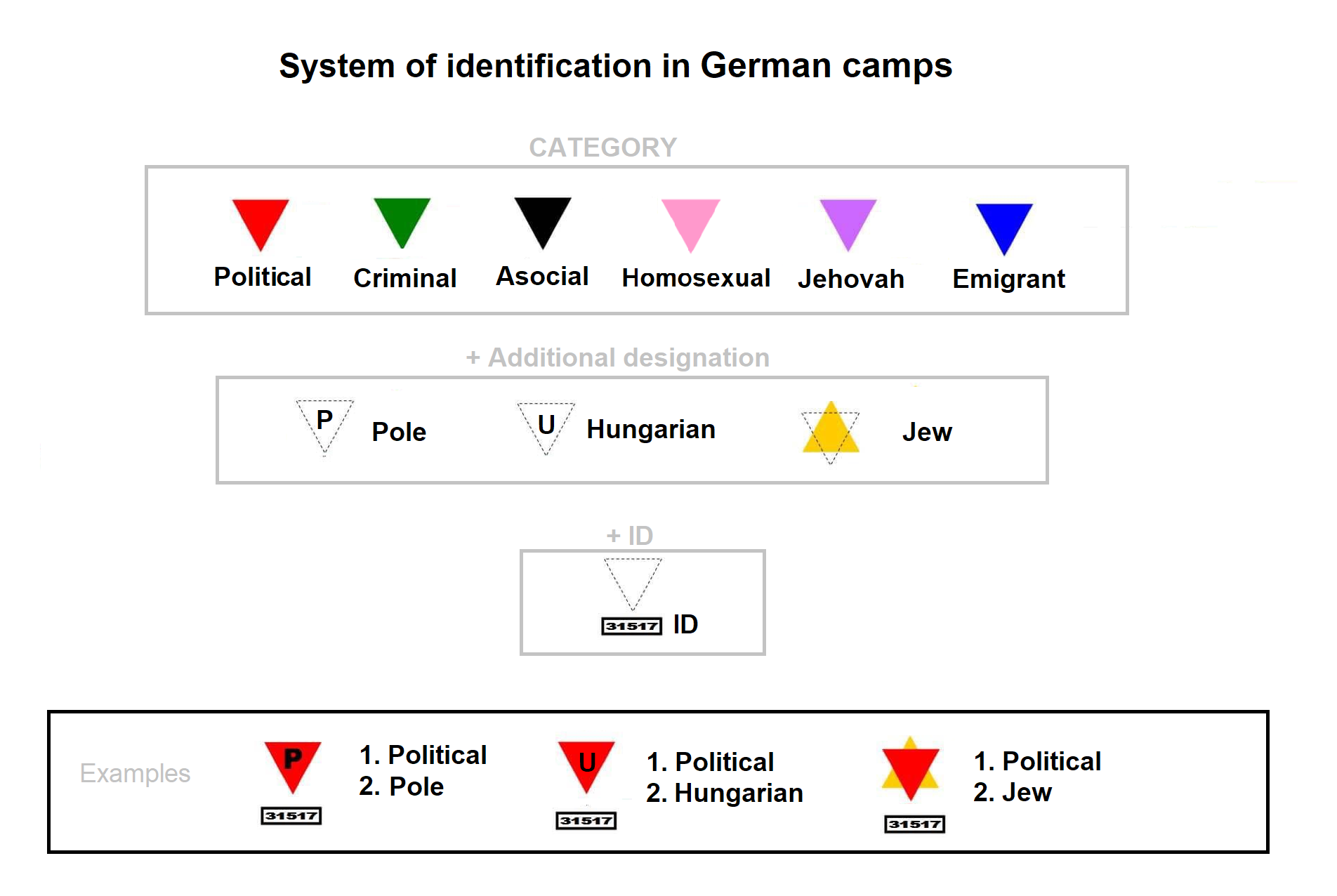
Prisoners' distinguishing badges

== Badge coding system ==
=== Variability ===
The system varied between camps and over time. Dachau concentration camp had one of the more elaborate systems.

=== Single triangles ===
Triangle	Prisoner categories
▲ Red upright	A red triangle pointing upwards was used for enemy POWs (Sonderhäftlinge, meaning special detainees), spies or traitors (Aktionshäftlinge, meaning activities detainees), or military deserters or criminals (Wehrmachtsangehörige, meaning Armed Forces members), and Strafbataillon.
▼ Red inverted	Red emblems of a political enemy on a Dachau detainee's clothing. Austrian economist Benedikt Kautsky, a Political prisoner, liberated from Buchenwald. (Note: United States Army photo of Austrian economist and financial specialist Benedikt Kautsky, a political prisoner, who was liberated from Buchenwald.) The red inverted triangle was used for political prisoners, including: The Nazi Party's political opponents, starting in Germany: Communists; Social democrats; Democrats; Socialists; Liberals; Trade unionists; Anarchists; Anti-fascists; Freemasons; See also: Persecution of Freemasons § Nazi Germany and occupied Europe and Grand Anti-Masonic Exhibition.; Occupied country resistance members (partisans) including: Jewish women in the resistance who were operating under false identities.; Gentiles who assisted Jews such as Odette Pilpoul; Some lesbians and members of other marginalised groups such as Yvonne Ziegler and Suzanne Leclézio.; Badge for a Polish (non-Jewish) political prisoner (ID 29659), Lidia Główczewska, in Stutthof.
▼ Green	Green indicated convicts and criminals (Berufsverbrecher - BV): Often working as kapos.
▼ Blue	Blue showed foreign forced laborers and emigrants. This category included stateless people ("apatrides", Spanish: apátridas), Emigrants, people who had fled Nazi Germany and been arrested when they returned, including Jews and political opponents of the Nazi Party.; Spanish prisoners at Mauthausen, who were marked with trees at other camps.; Spanish refugees from Francoist Spain whose citizenship was revoked and emigrants to countries which were occupied by Nazi Germany or were under the German sphere of influence.
▼ Brown	Brown was assigned to male Roma later on in the Romani Holocaust. Originally, all Roma wore a black triangle with a Z (Zigeuner); female Roma continued to wear the black triangle, as they were viewed as petty criminals.
▼ Black	The black triangle indicated people who were deemed asocial elements (asozial) Black triangles on the trousers of Romani detainees at Dachau. Including the following: Mentally ill and developmentally disabled. Their triangles were additionally inscribed with the word Blöd, meaning "stupid". Schizophrenic and epileptic people were forcibly sterilized, shot, or gassed in psychiatric institutions as opposed to at the Nazi camps.; Other disabled people, such as people with diabetes (as "Diabetes was conceptualized as a Jewish disease not necessarily because its prevalence was high among this population, but because medicine, science, and culture reinforced each other").; Alcoholics; drug addicts; Work-shy (arbeitsscheu); Vagrants and beggars.; Pacifists and conscription resisters.; Female prostitutes; Female sex workers; Lesbian women; Roma and Sinti. They wore the black triangle with a Z notation (for Zigeuner, meaning "Gypsy") to the right of the triangle's point, or in white on top of the triangle. Male Roma were later assigned a brown triangle.; Swingjugend
▼ Purple	A prisoner uniform with a purple triangle, the mark of Jehovah's Witnesses. Purple was mostly used for Jehovah's Witnesses (over 99%) as well as members of other small pacifist religious groups. (Note: Johannes S. Wrobel (June 2006). "Jehovah's Witnesses in National Socialist Concentration Camps, 1933–45". Religion, State & Society. Vol. 34. No. 2. pp. 89–125. "The concentration camp prisoner category 'Bible Student' at times apparently included a few members from small Bible Student splinter groups, as well as adherents of other religious groups which played only a secondary role during the time of the National Socialist regime, such as Adventists, Baptists and the New Apostolic community (Garbe 1999, pp. 82, 406; Zeiger, 2001, p. 72). Since their numbers in the camps were quite small compared with the total number of Jehovah's Witness prisoners, I shall not consider them separately in this article. Historian Antje Zeiger (2001, p. 88) writes about Sachsenhausen camp: 'In May 1938, every tenth prisoner was a Jehovah's Witness. Less than one percent of the Witnesses included other religious nonconformists (Adventists, Baptists, pacifists), who were placed in the same prisoner classification.'") Specimen showing a purple triangle, indicating a Jehovah's Witness.
▼ Pink	Pink primarily indicated homosexual men and those who were identified as such at the time (e.g., bisexual men, male prostitutes, and those deemed "transvestites") and sexual offenders, as well as pedophiles and zoophiles. Many in this group were subject to forced sterilization.

==== Asoziale (anti-socials) ====
Asoziale (anti-socials) inmates wore a plain black triangle. They were considered either too "selfish" or "deviant" to contribute to society or were considered too impaired to support themselves. They were therefore considered a burden. This category included pacifists and conscription resisters, petty or habitual criminals, the mentally ill and the mentally and/or physically disabled. They were usually executed.

==== Lesbian prisons ====
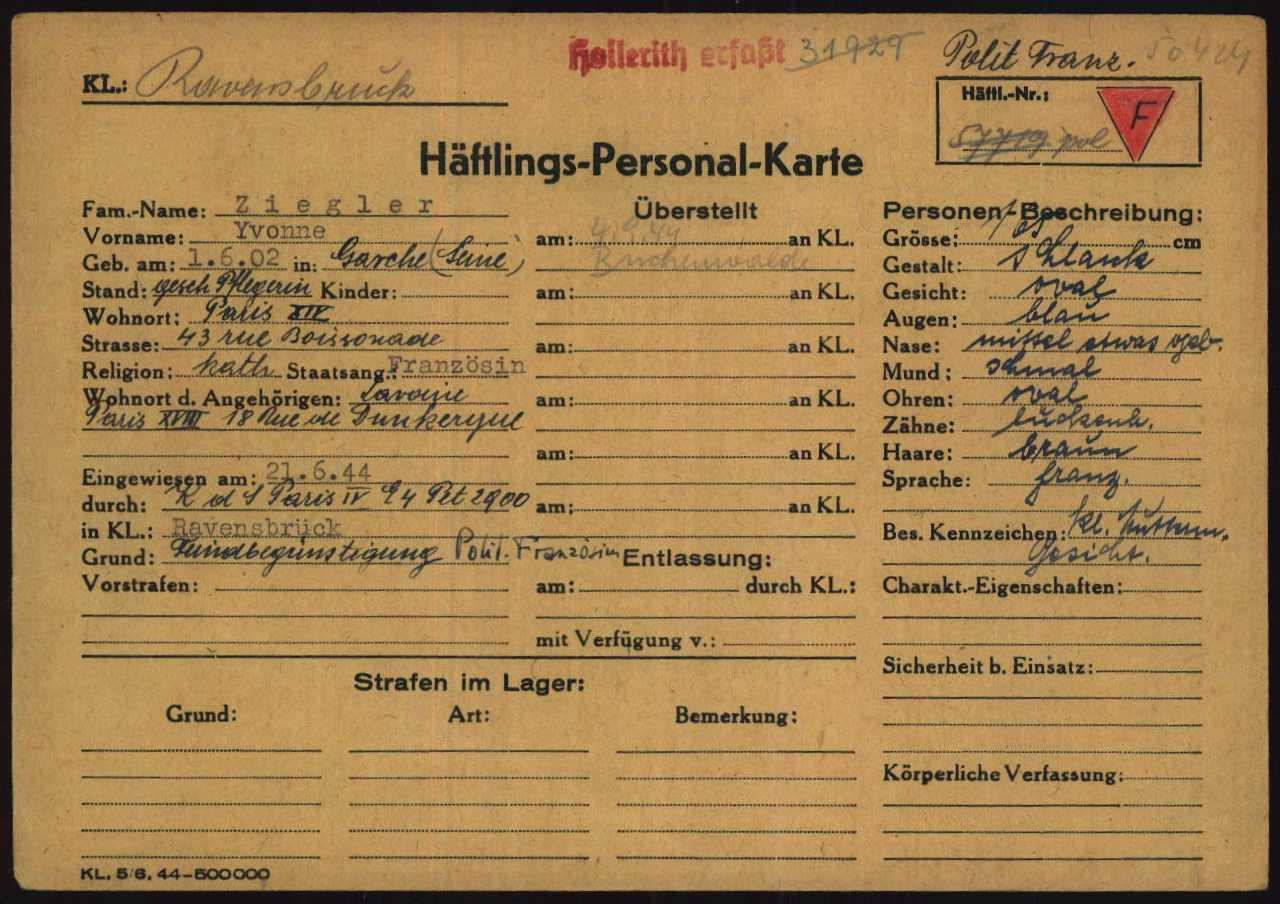
Ravensbruck prisoner paperwork for Yvonne Ziegler, partner of Suzanne Leclézio.

Lesbians did not have their own specific category. Women (including lesbians) who did not conform to Nazi gender norms (such as nationalist pronatalism) were usually labelled with the black triangle of asocials. Some lesbians were prominent in the original resistance, and thus they were labelled with the red triangle, such as Yvonne Ziegler and Suzanne Leclézio.

==== Wehrmacht Strafbataillon ====
The Wehrmacht Strafbataillon (punishment battalion) and SS Bewährungstruppe (probation company) were military punishment units. They consisted of Wehrmacht and SS military criminals, SS personnel convicted by an Honour Court of bad conduct, and civilian criminals for whom military service was either the assigned punishment or a voluntary replacement of imprisonment. They wore regular uniforms and were forbidden from wearing a rank or unit insignia until they had proven themselves in combat. They wore an uninverted (point-upwards) red triangle on their upper sleeves to indicate their status. Most were used for hard labor, "special tasks" (unwanted, dangerous jobs like defusing landmines or running phone cables) or were used as forlorn hopes or cannon fodder. The infamous Dirlewanger Brigade was an example of a regular unit created from such personnel.

==== Limited preventative custody ====
Limited preventative custody detainee (Befristete Vorbeugungshaft Häftling, or BV) was the term for general criminals, who wore green triangles with no special marks. They originally were only supposed to be incarcerated at the camp until their term expired, and then they would be released. When the war began, they were confined indefinitely for its duration.

==== Examples of the single triangle badges at Nazi camps ====
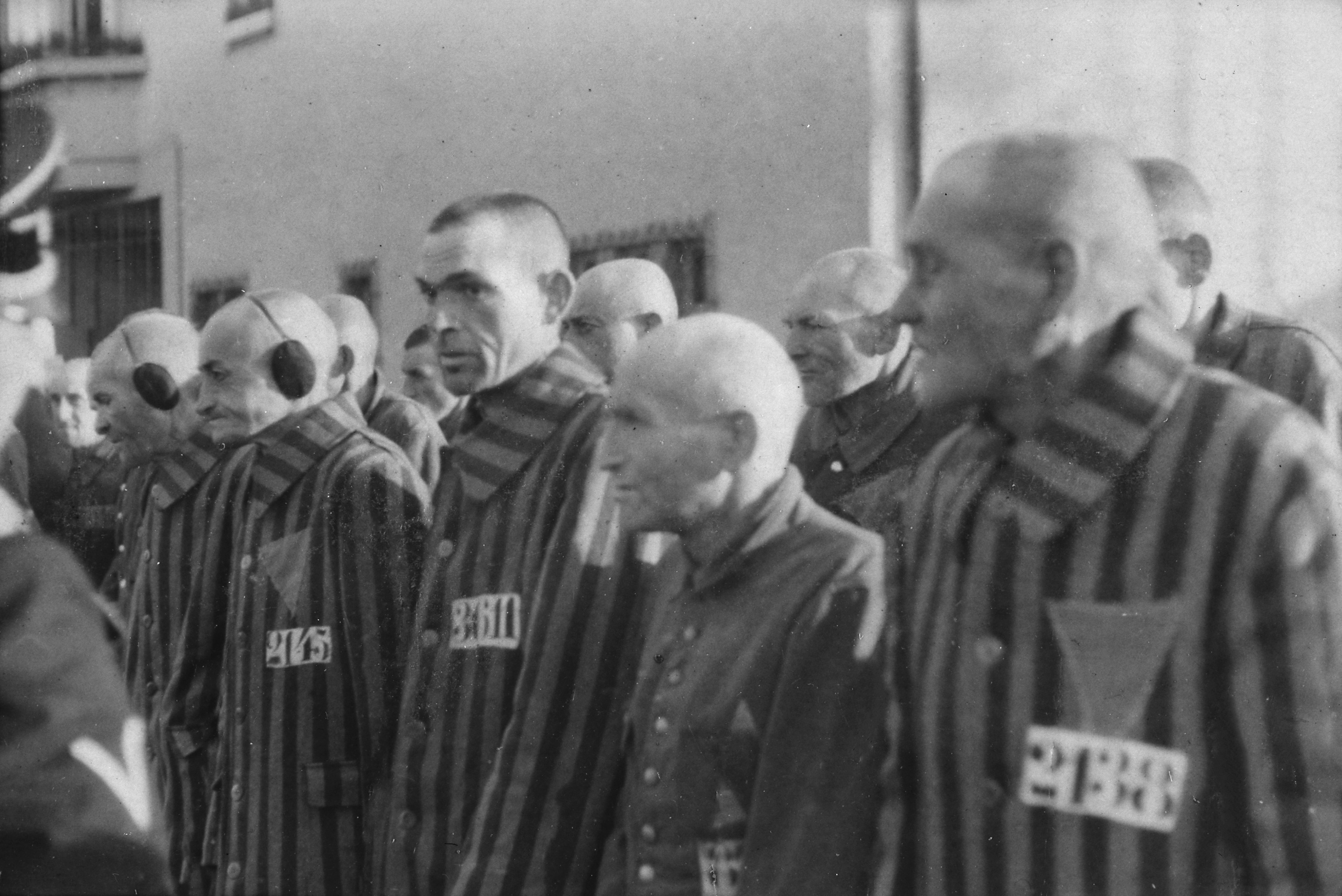
Single-triangles visible on Sachsenhausen detainees

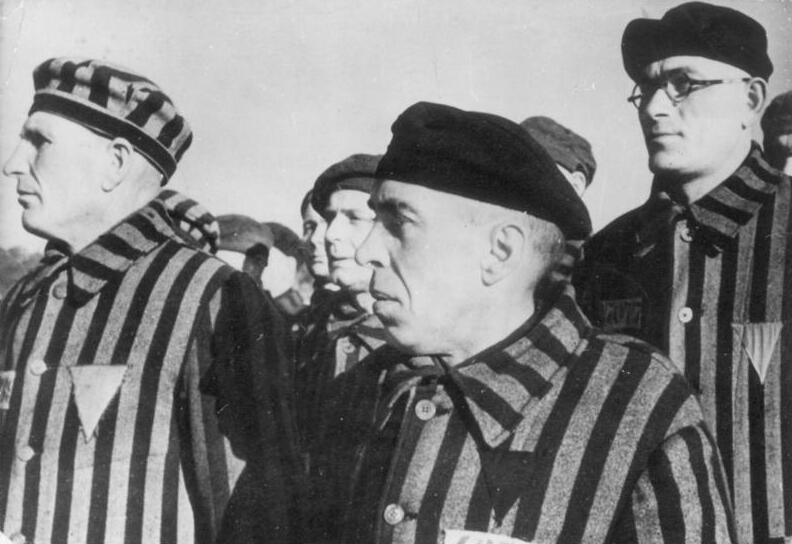
Single-triangle badges in various colours visible on detainees in Sachsenhausen

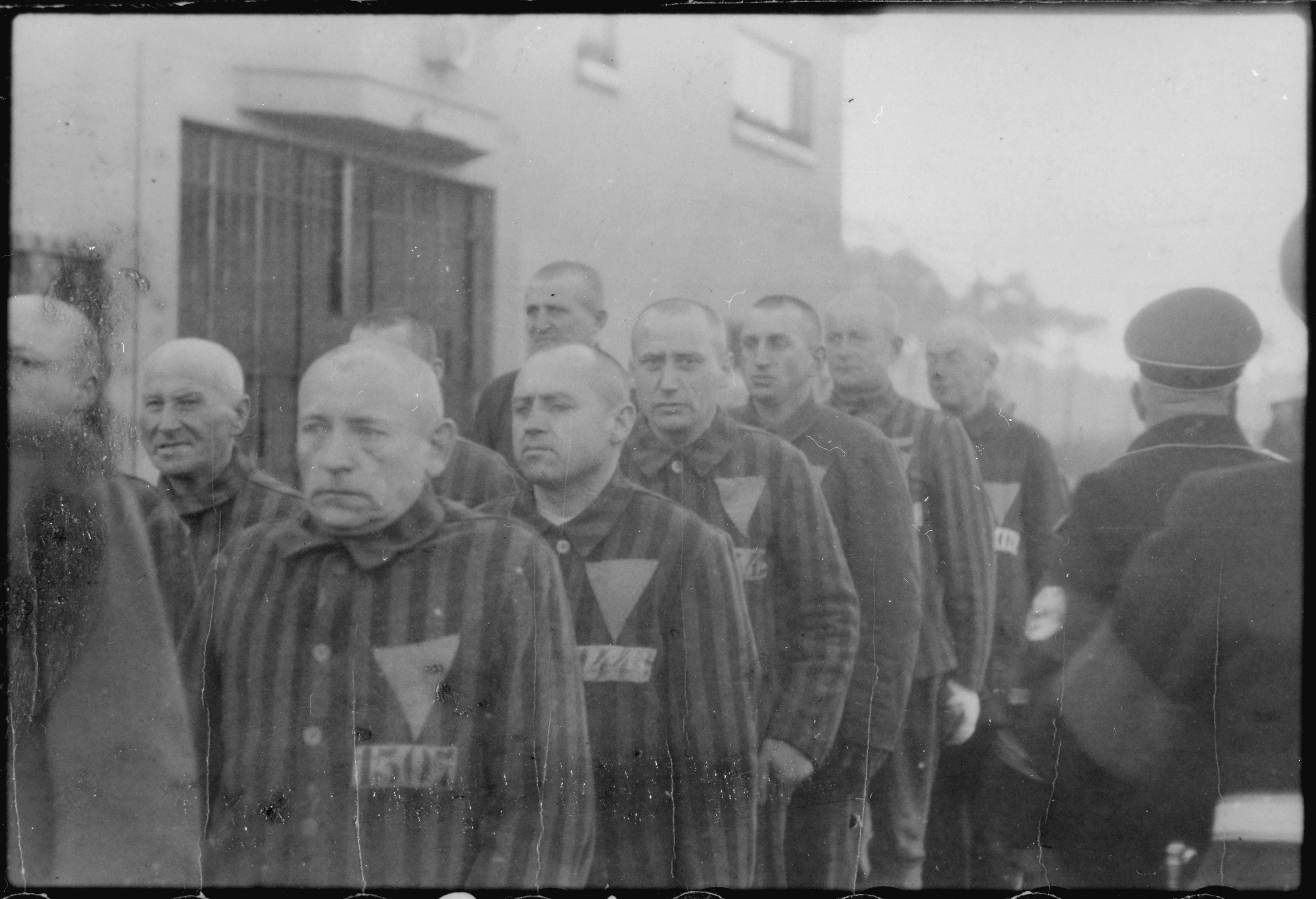
More Sachsenhausen detainees

=== Double triangles and multiple colours ===
==== Origins of yellow star badges ====
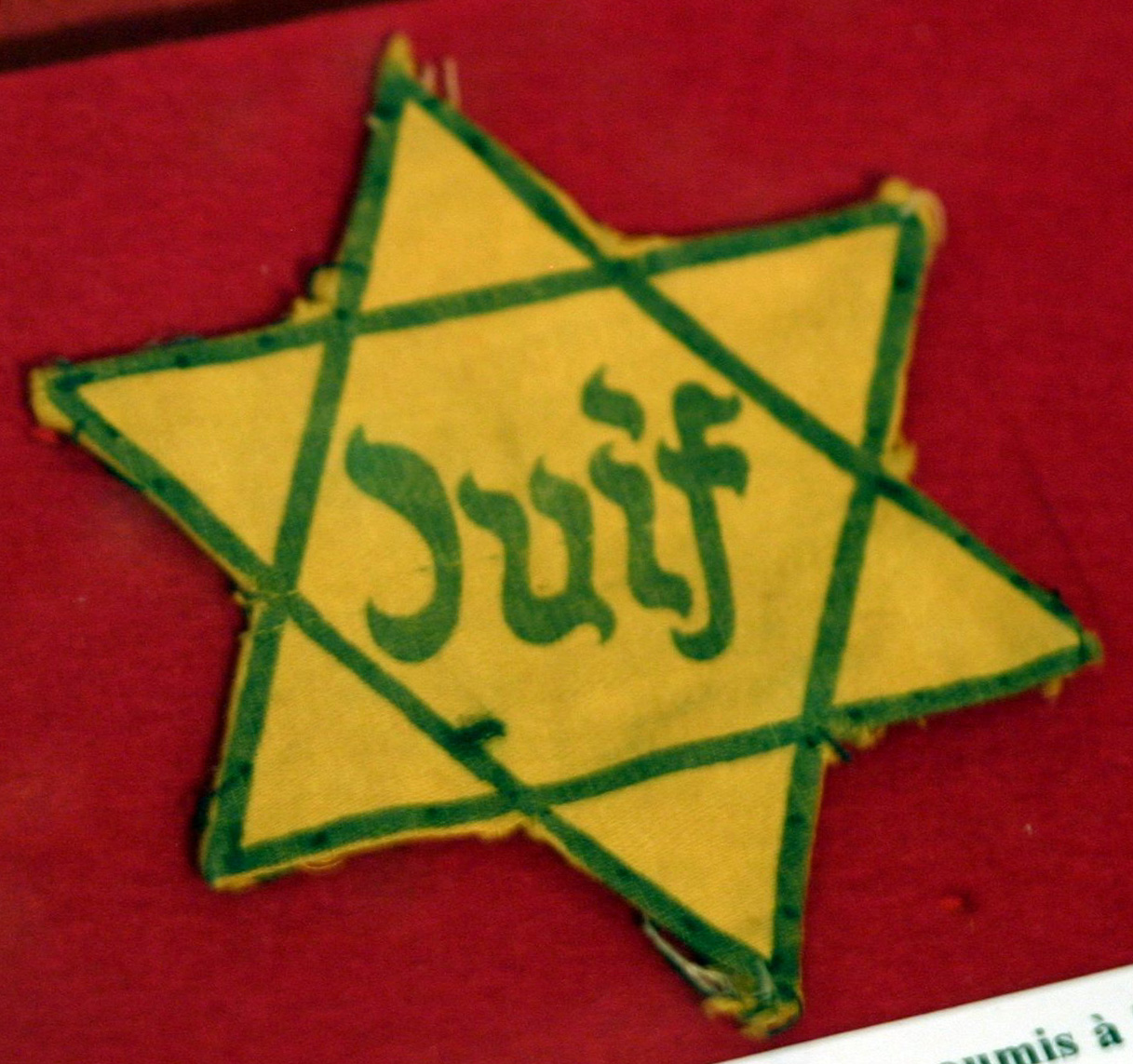
Wearing a yellow star was mandatory for Jews in occupied Europe, before the badge was used in concentration camps. (Note: The text says in French: Juif, lit. 'Jew'. See also: Nazi occupation of France.)

Double-triangle badges usually used two superimposed triangles to form a six-pointed star, resembling the Jewish Star of David. Yellow stars were first used by the Nazis in Jewish ghettos in occupied Poland. Jews elsewhere in German-occupied Europe were then also forced to wear the symbol in public and in Nazi-established ghettos.

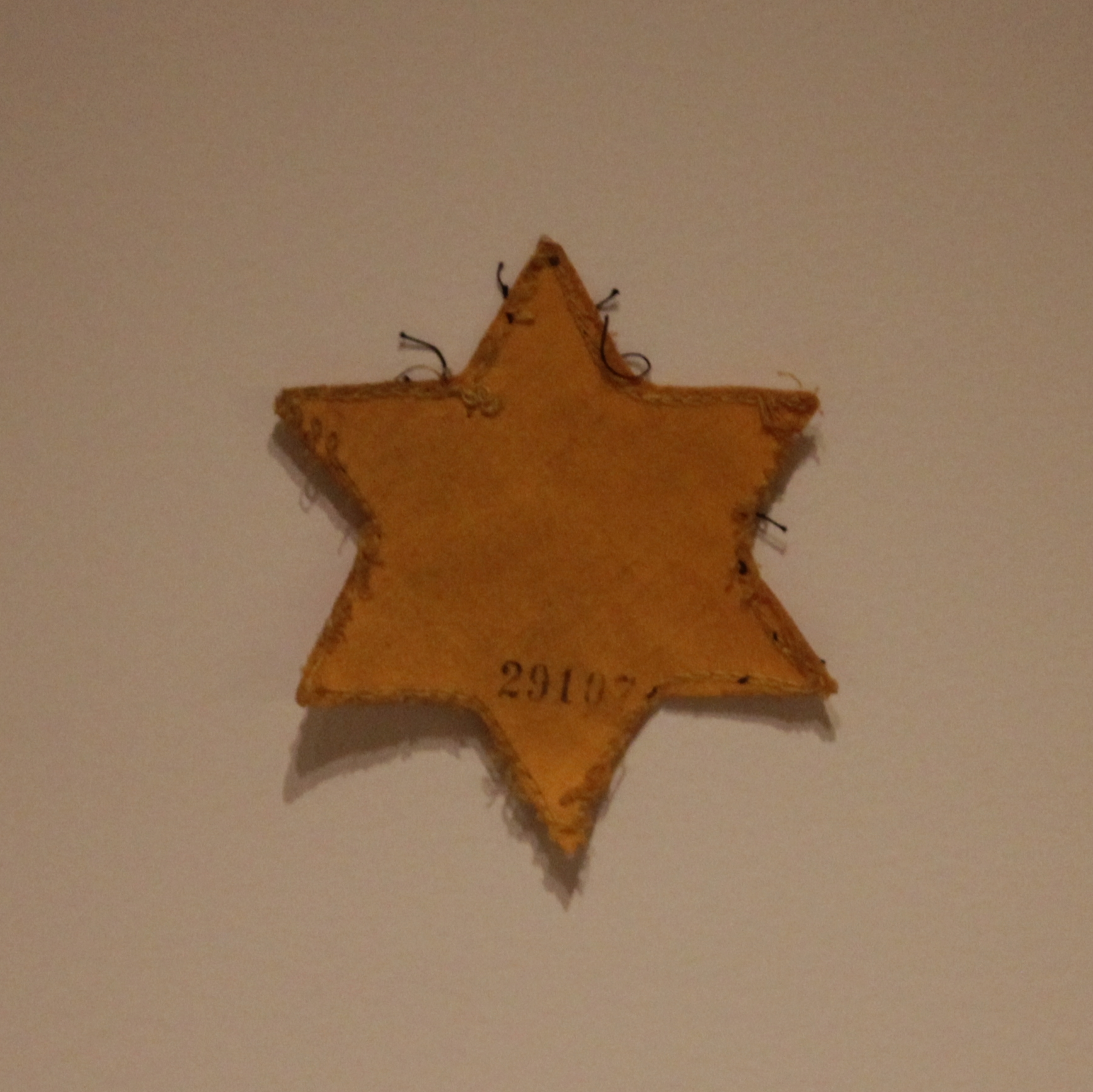
Yellow star from Dachau

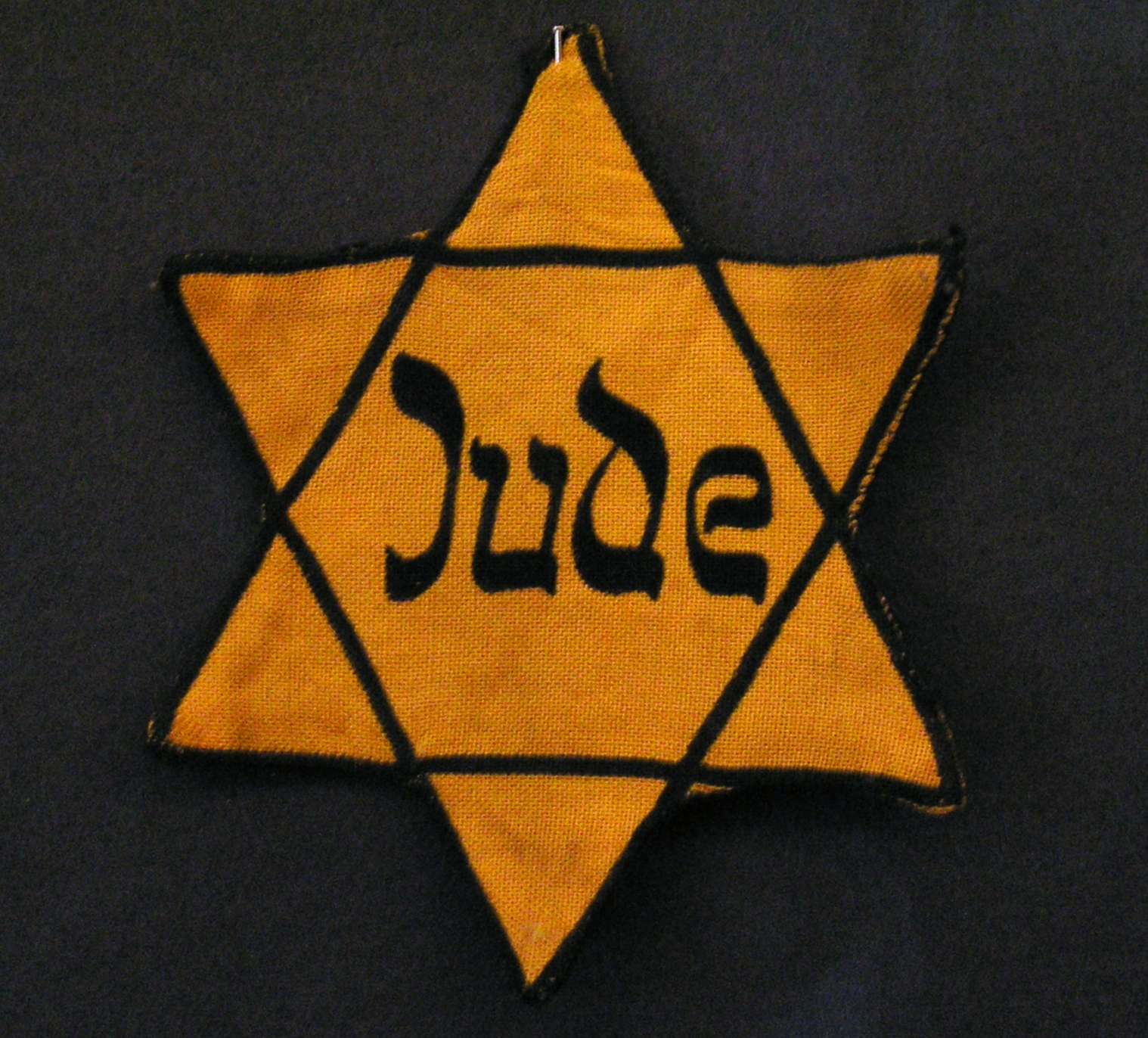
Yellow badge at the Jüdisches Museum Westfalen

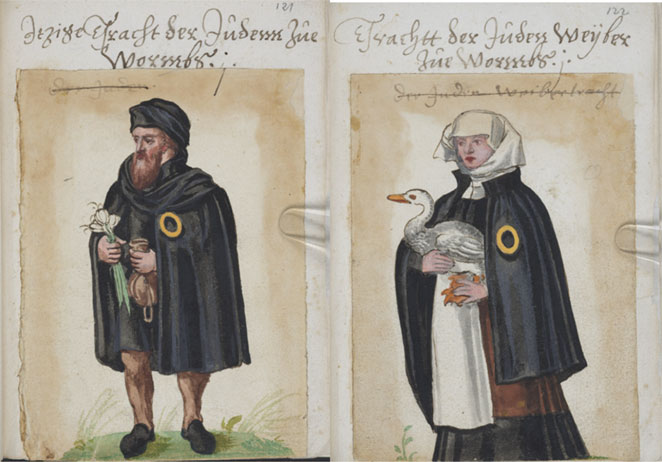
Painting of Jews in 16th Century Germany wearing circular yellow badges. (Note: The man holds a moneybag and bulbs of garlic (often used in artistic portrayals of Jews in medieval Europe.)

==== Colour combinations for double triangles ====
Inverted triangle	Overlayed on	Person	Other prisoner categories
▼ Blue	▼ A red inverted triangle to form a red border (Note: Both triangles were inverted, so unlike the others, it does not form a six-pointed star.)	Represented a foreign forced labour and political prisoner, such as Spanish Republicans in Mauthausen.	
▼ Yellow	▲ An upright yellow triangle to form a 6-pointed star.	A Jewish person with no other category.	
▼ Red	▲ An upright yellow triangle to form a 6-pointed star.	A Jewish political prisoner.	
▼ Green	▲ An upright yellow triangle to form a 6-pointed star.	A Jewish habitual criminal. (Note: Like those who wore pink and green triangles, people in the bottom two categories would have been convicted in criminal courts.)	
▼ Purple	▲ An upright yellow triangle to form a 6-pointed star.	A Jehovah's Witness of Jewish descent.	
▼ Pink	▲ An upright yellow triangle to form a 6-pointed star.	A Jewish "sexual offender", typically a gay or bisexual man.	
▼ Black	▲ An upright yellow triangle to form a 6-pointed star.	An "asocial" or work-shy Jew.	
▽ Black (voided)	▲ An upright yellow triangle to form a 6-pointed star.	A Jew	convicted of miscegenation and labelled as a Rassenschänder (race defiler).
▼ Yellow	▲ An upright black triangle	An "Aryan" woman	convicted of miscegenation and labelled as a Rassenschänder (race defiler).

==== Examples of the double triangle design ====
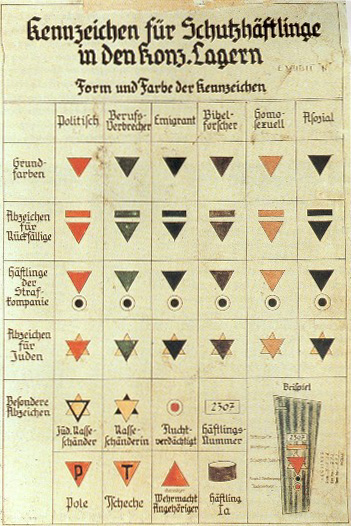
Marking codes used by the Nazis.

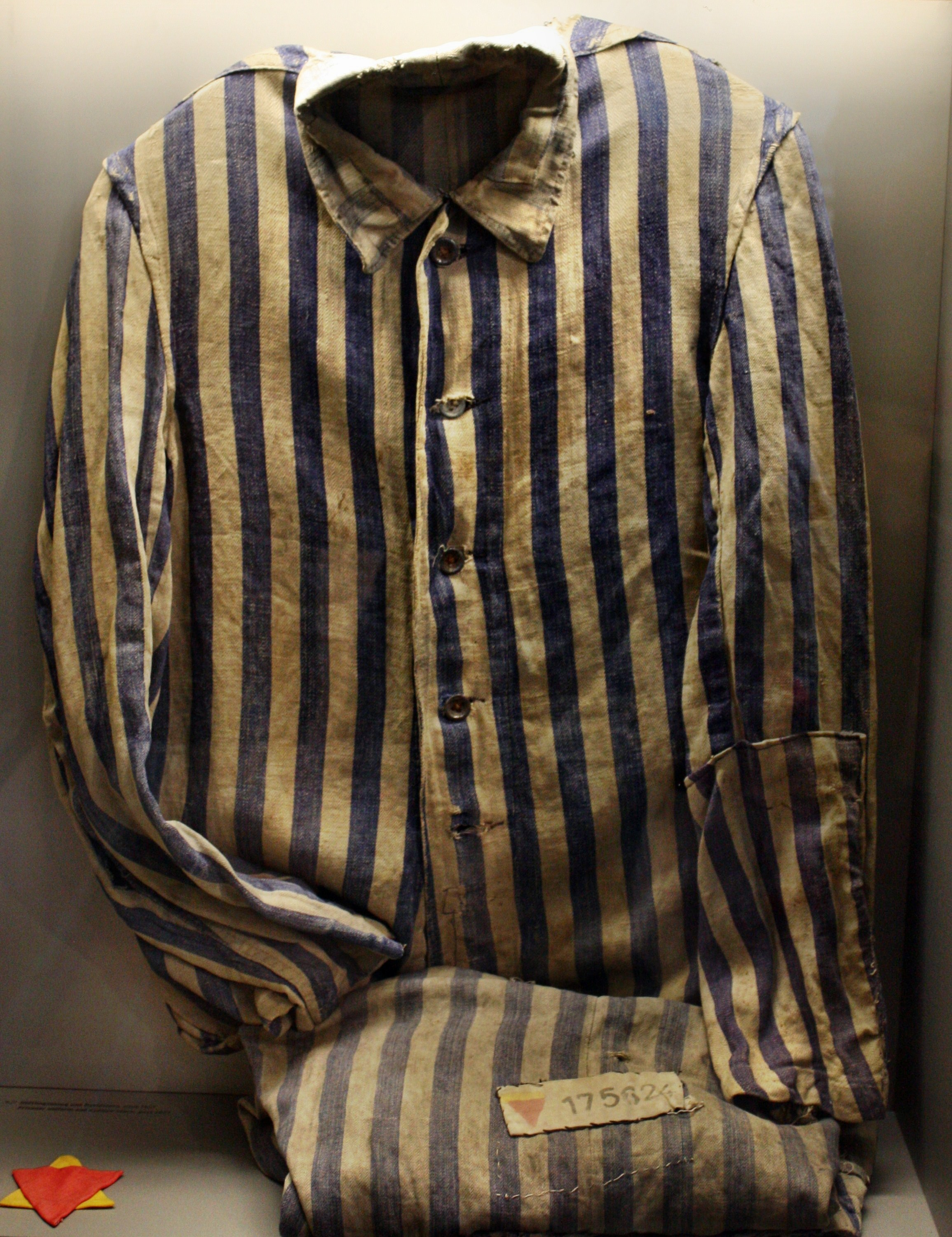
Sachsenhausen detainee's red political enemy triangle atop a yellow Jew triangle (lower left)

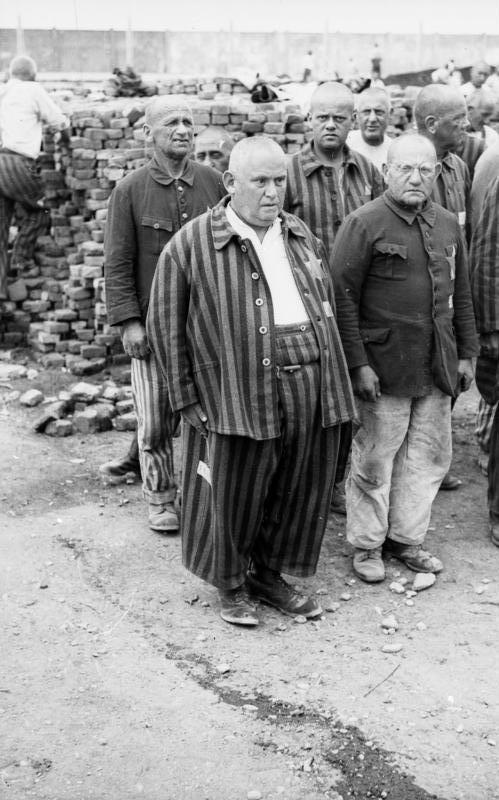
Part of a Dachau roll call – day badges visible on detainees

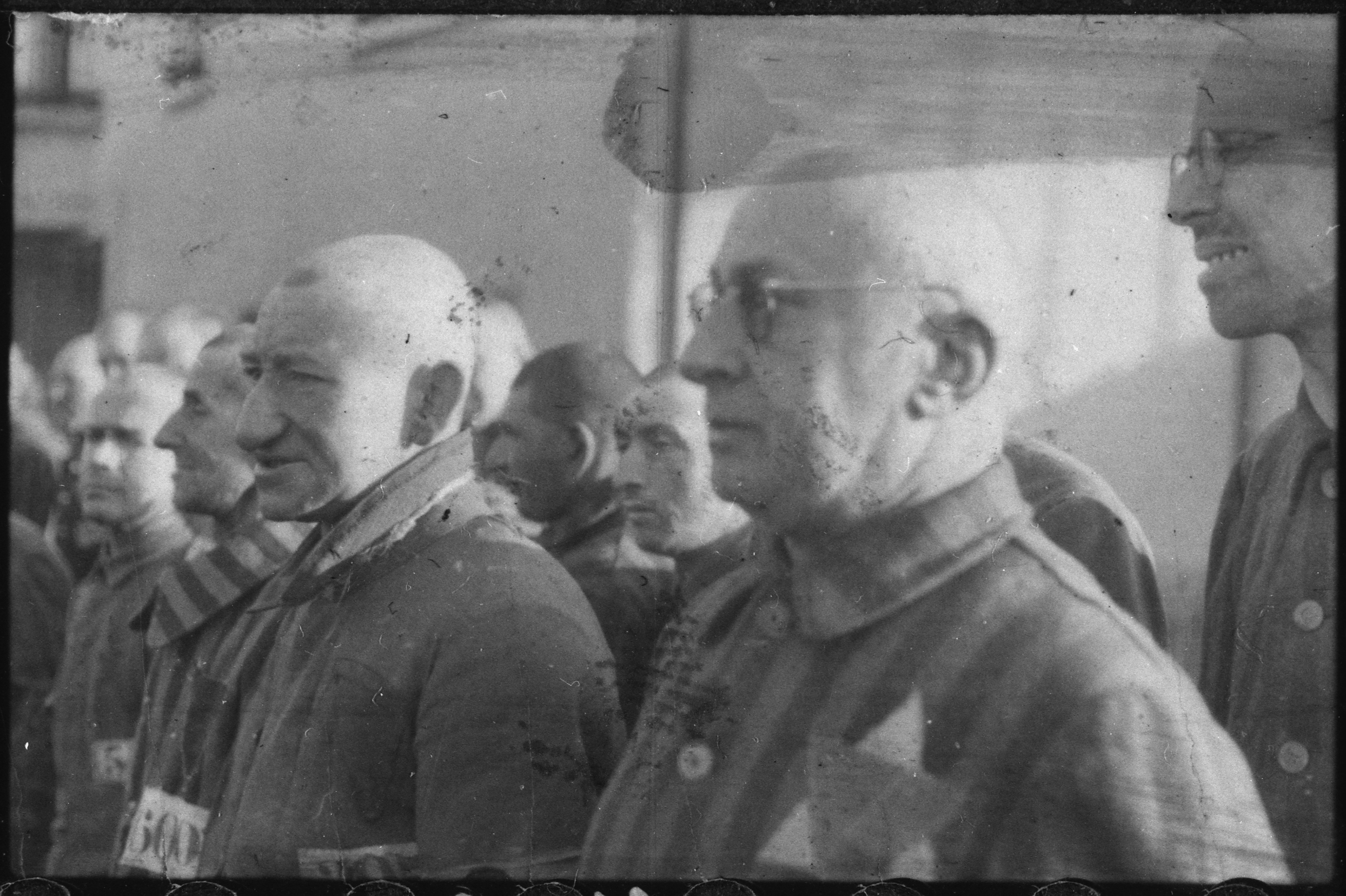
Sachsenhausen detainee with glasses in the foreground wears a two-colour ID-emblem

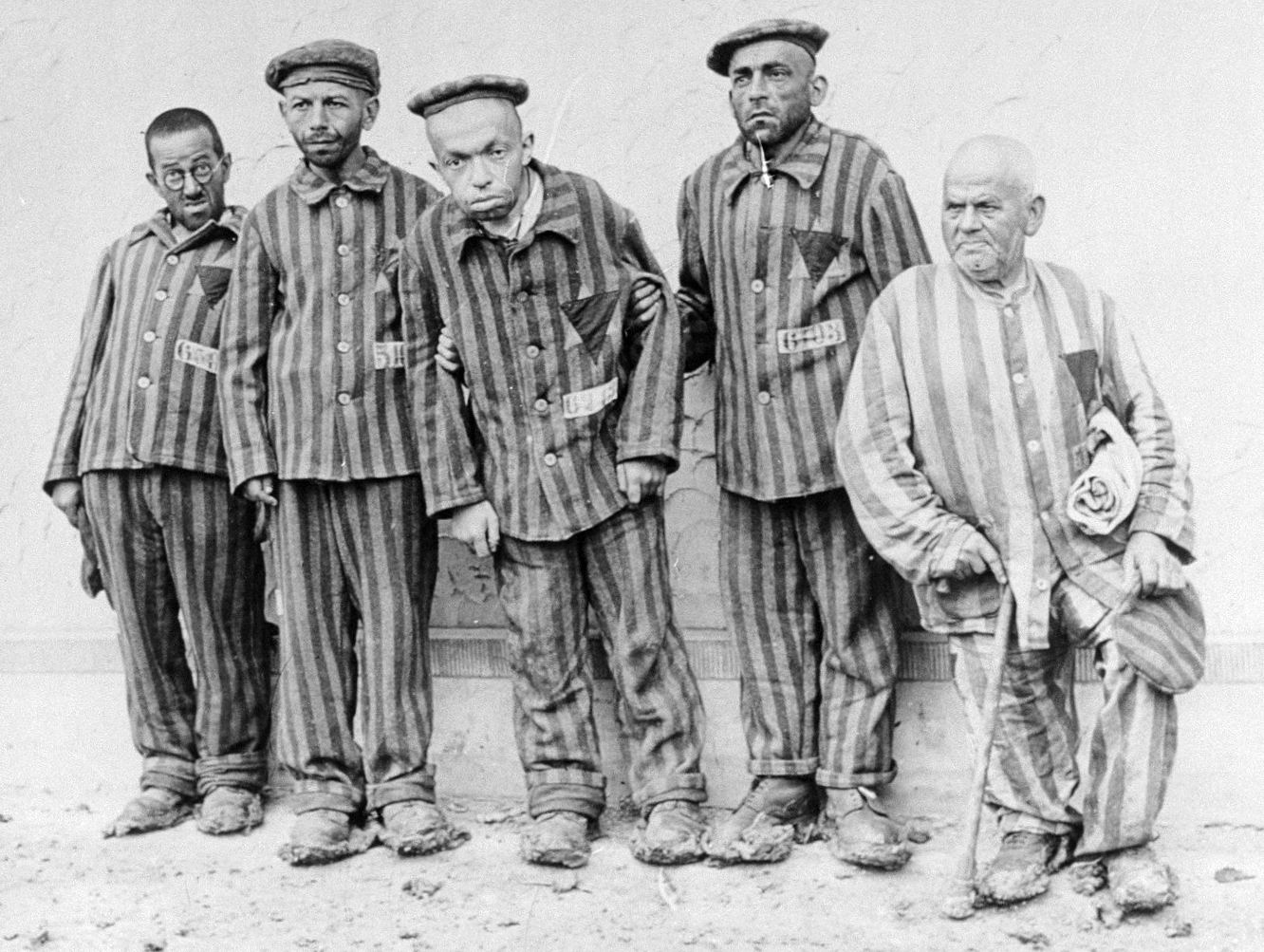
Disabled Jews with a black triangle on a yellow triangle, meaning asocial Jews, Buchenwald, 1938.

=== Coloured bars to show multiple categories ===
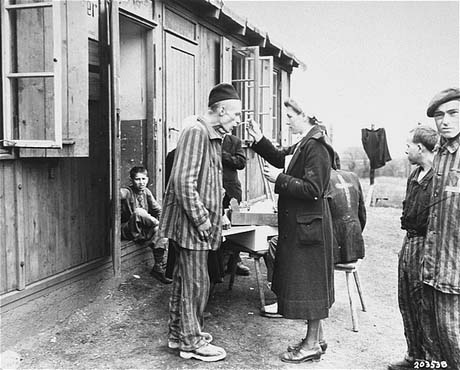
Liberated Neuengamme survivor standing on the right has a triangle patch with a top-bar

Repeat offenders (rückfällige, meaning recidivists) would receive bars over their stars or triangles, a different colour for a different crime.

- A political prisoner would have a red bar over their star or triangle.
- A professional criminal would have a green bar.
- A foreign forced laborer would not have a blue bar, as their imprisonment was for the duration of the war, but might have a different coloured bar if they were drawn from another pool of inmates.
- A Jehovah's Witness would have a purple bar.
- A homosexual or sex offender would have a pink bar.
- An asocial would have a black bar.
- Roma and Sinti would usually be incarcerated in special sub-camps until they died, and so would not normally receive a repeat stripe.

From late 1944, to save cloth, Jewish prisoners wore a yellow bar over a regular triangle pointed down to indicate their status. For instance, regular Jews would wear a yellow bar over a red triangle. Jewish criminals would wear a yellow bar over a green triangle.

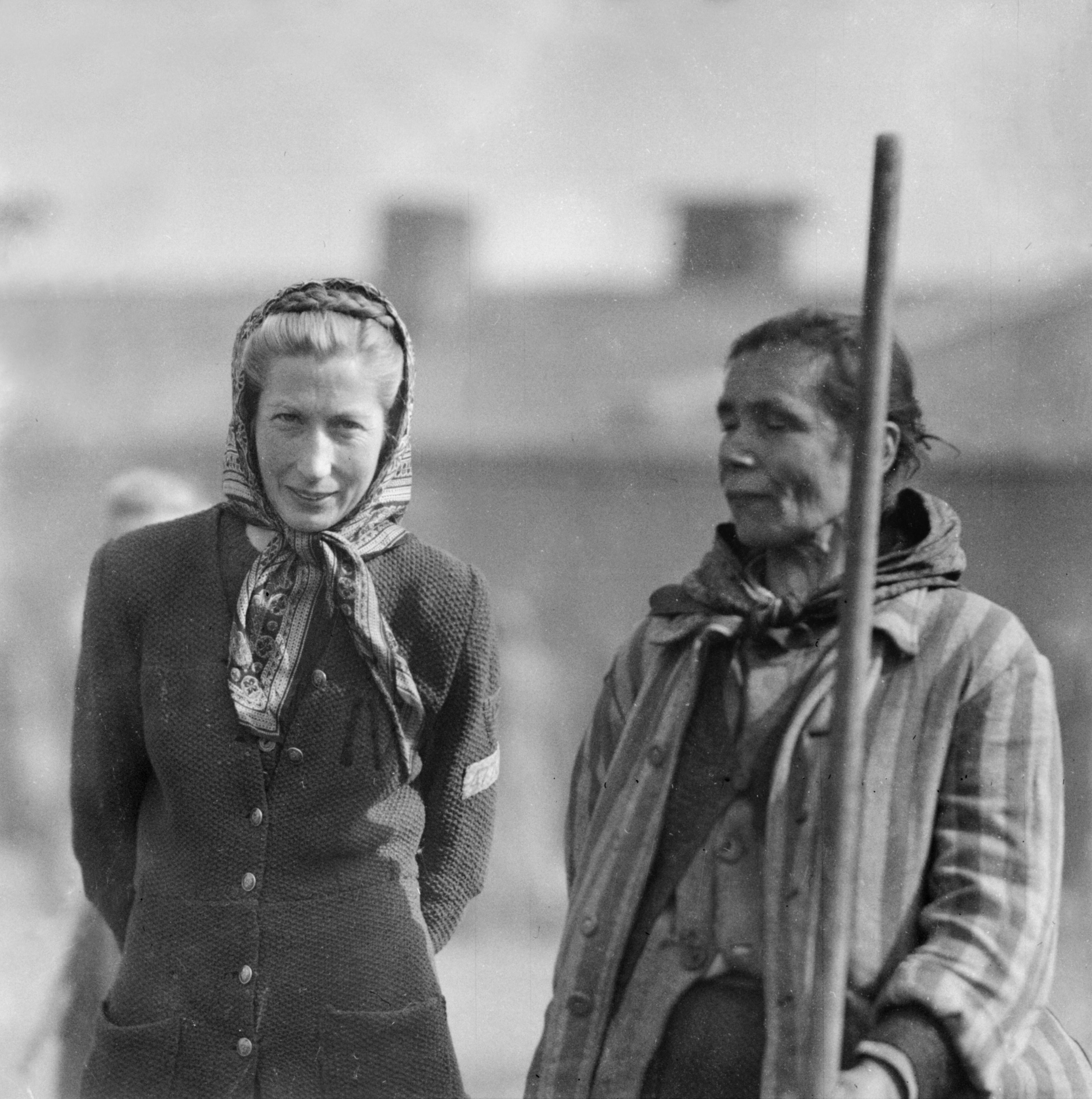
A liberated Bergen-Belsen survivor with a late war ersatz variant (left) showcasing no cloth patch, but a prominent N marked on the outer clothes

=== Civilian clothing ===
Detainees wearing civilian clothing instead of the striped uniforms, more common later in the war, were often marked with a prominent X on the back. This made for an ersatz prisoner uniform. For permanence, such Xs were made with white oil paint, with sewn-on cloth strips, or were cut, with underlying jacket-liner fabric providing the contrasting colour. Detainees were compelled to sew their number and if applicable, a triangle emblem onto the fronts of such X-ed clothing.

=== Other distinguishing markings ===
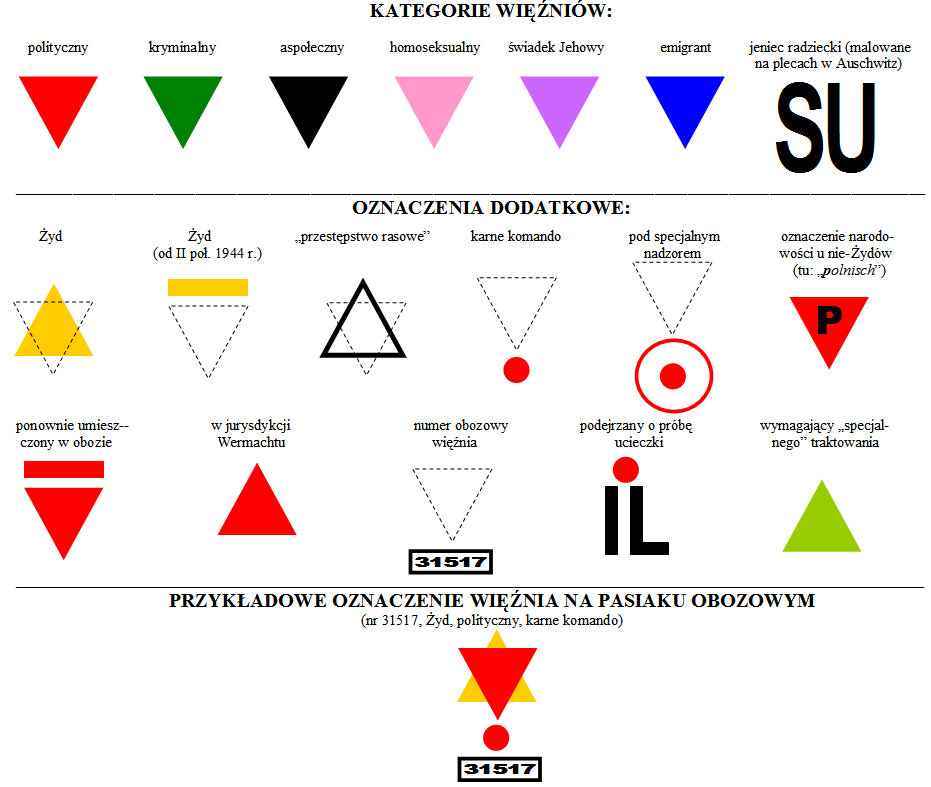
Other distinguishing markings

Many markings and combinations existed. A prisoner would usually have at least two, and possibly more than six.

==== Strafkompanie (punishment company) ====
A Strafkompanie (punishment company) was a hard labour unit in the camps. Inmates assigned to it wore a black roundel bordered white under their triangle patch.

==== Fluchtverdächtiger (escape risk) ====
Prisoners "suspected of [attempting to] escape" (Fluchtverdächtiger) wore a red roundel bordered white under their triangle patch. If also assigned to hard labour, they wore the red roundel under their black Strafkompanie roundel.

==== Funktionshäftling (prisoner-functionary) ====
A prisoner-functionary (Funktionshäftling), or kapo (boss), wore a cloth brassard (their Kennzeichen, or identifying mark) to indicate their status. They served as camp guards (Lagerpolizei), barracks clerks (Blockschreiber) and the senior prisoners (ältesten, meaning elders) at the camp (lagerältester), barracks (blockältester) and room (stubenältester) levels of camp organisation. They received privileges like bigger and sometimes better food rations, better quarters or even a private room, luxuries like tobacco or alcohol, and access to the camp's facilities, like the showers or the pool. Failure to please their captors meant demotion and loss of privileges, and almost certain death at the hands of their fellow inmates.

=== Letters ===
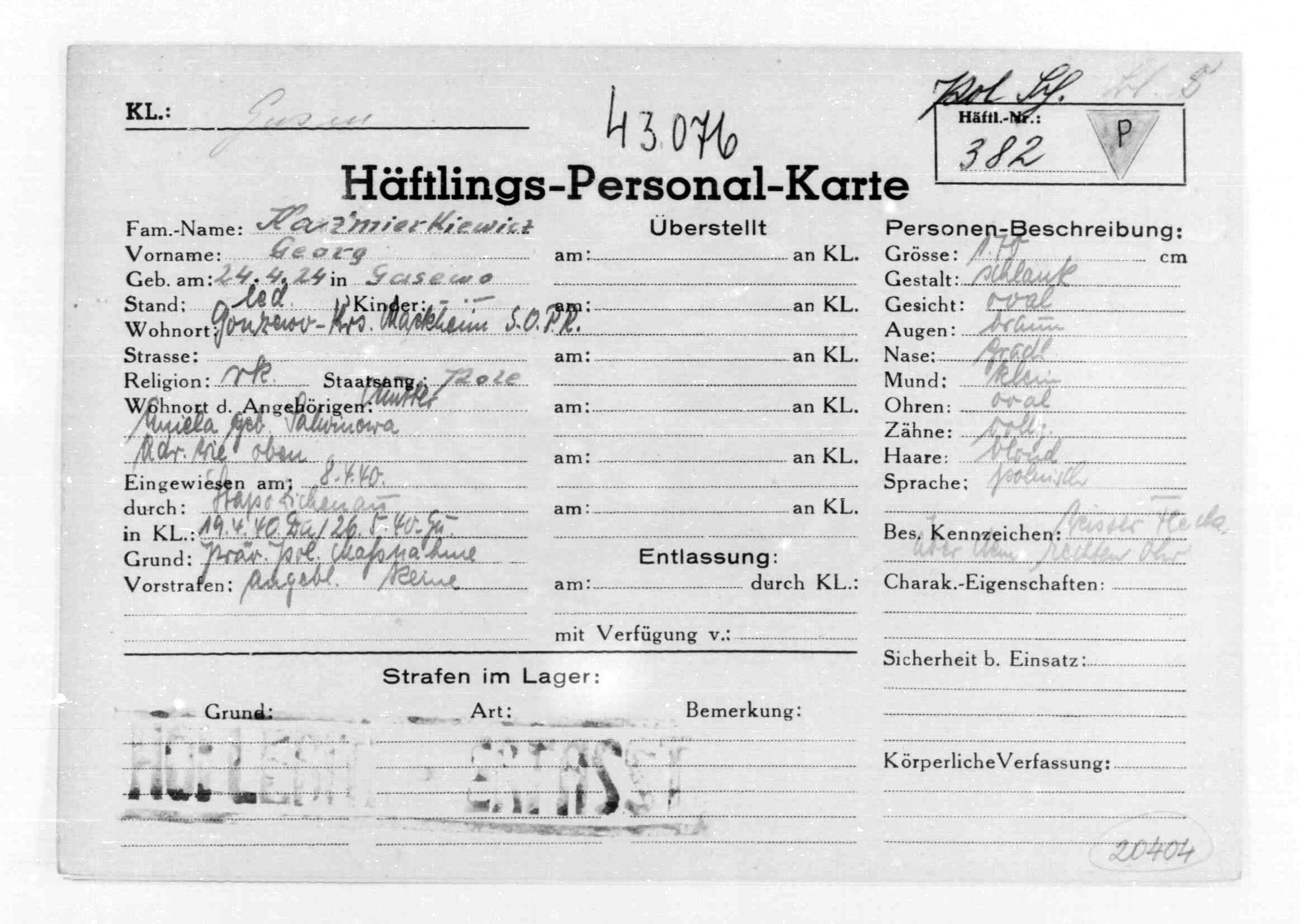
Emblems were used on some detainee ID-cards, as shown here on the Mauthausen card of Polish scientist Jerzy Kaźmirkiewicz, where a P-triangle appears.

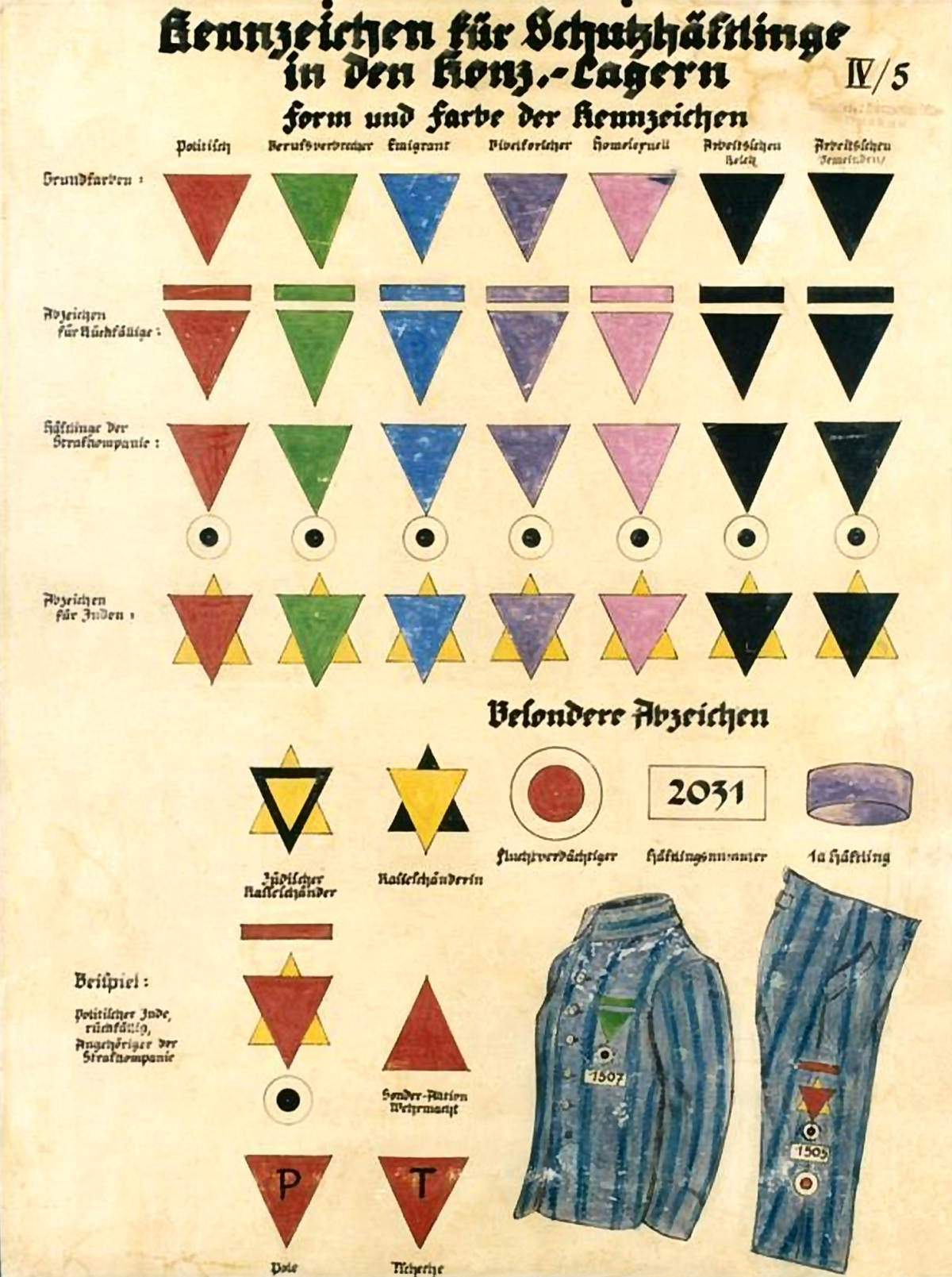
Plate with concentration camp marking.

==== Nationality markers ====
In addition to colour-coding, non-German prisoners were marked by the first letter of the German name for their home country or ethnic group. Red triangle with a letter, for example:

- B (Belgier, Belgians)
- E (Engländer, "English"; in practice used for all British)
- F (Franzosen, French)
- I (Italiener, Italians)
- J (Jugoslawen, Yugoslavs)
- N (Niederländer, Dutch) — H (for Hollander) is also recorded
- No (Norweger, Norwegian)
- P (Polen, Poles)
- S (Spanier, generally used for Spanish Republican exiles)
- T (Tscheche, Czechs)
- U (Ungarn, Hungarians)
- Z next to, or on top of, a black triangle (Zigeuner, "gypsy"): Roma. Male Roma were issued with brown triangles in some camps.

Polish emigrant laborers originally wore a purple diamond with a yellow backing. A letter P (for Polen) was cut out of the purple cloth to show the yellow backing beneath.

After the Allies signed the Armistice with Italy and the Italian Racial Laws were voided by the new government under Pietro Badogolio, German forces invaded Italy and took over all of the concentration and war prisoner camps. Italian prisoners ranged from Dissidents, Jews, Romani people, Foreigners and Ethnic Minorities that Fascist Party deemed "Undesirable and Subhuman" and Physically and Mentally Ill that were considered "Useless to Military, Useless to the Party and Useless to the State." The Germans also rounded up members of the Carabinieri as they refused to fight for the Germans and the Italian Socialist Republic. Italian Jews were forced to wear a yellow star that had the letter E (Ebreo for Jewish Italian man, Ebrea for Jewish Italian woman). For all other badges had the letter I or the word Italiener for Italian.

===== Examples of nationality-letter marking at Nazi camps =====
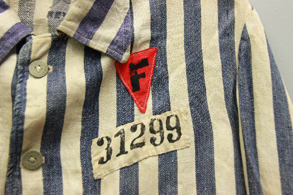
F on a red triangle (French political enemy) on the Buchenwald clothing of Dr. Joseph Brau

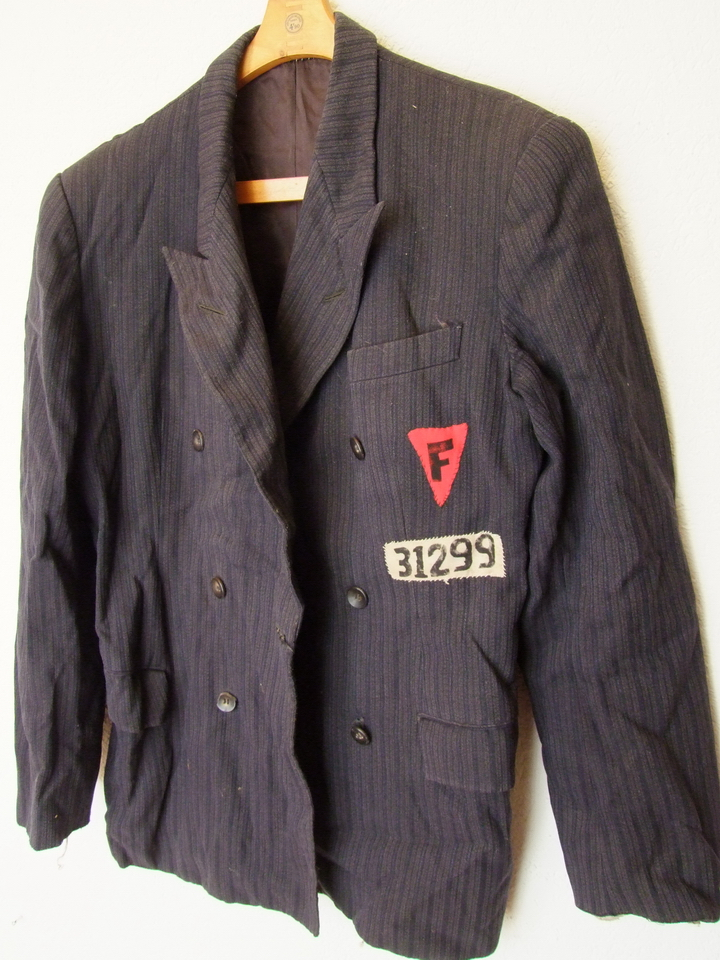
A F-triangle on the Buchenwald clothing of Dr. Joseph Brau

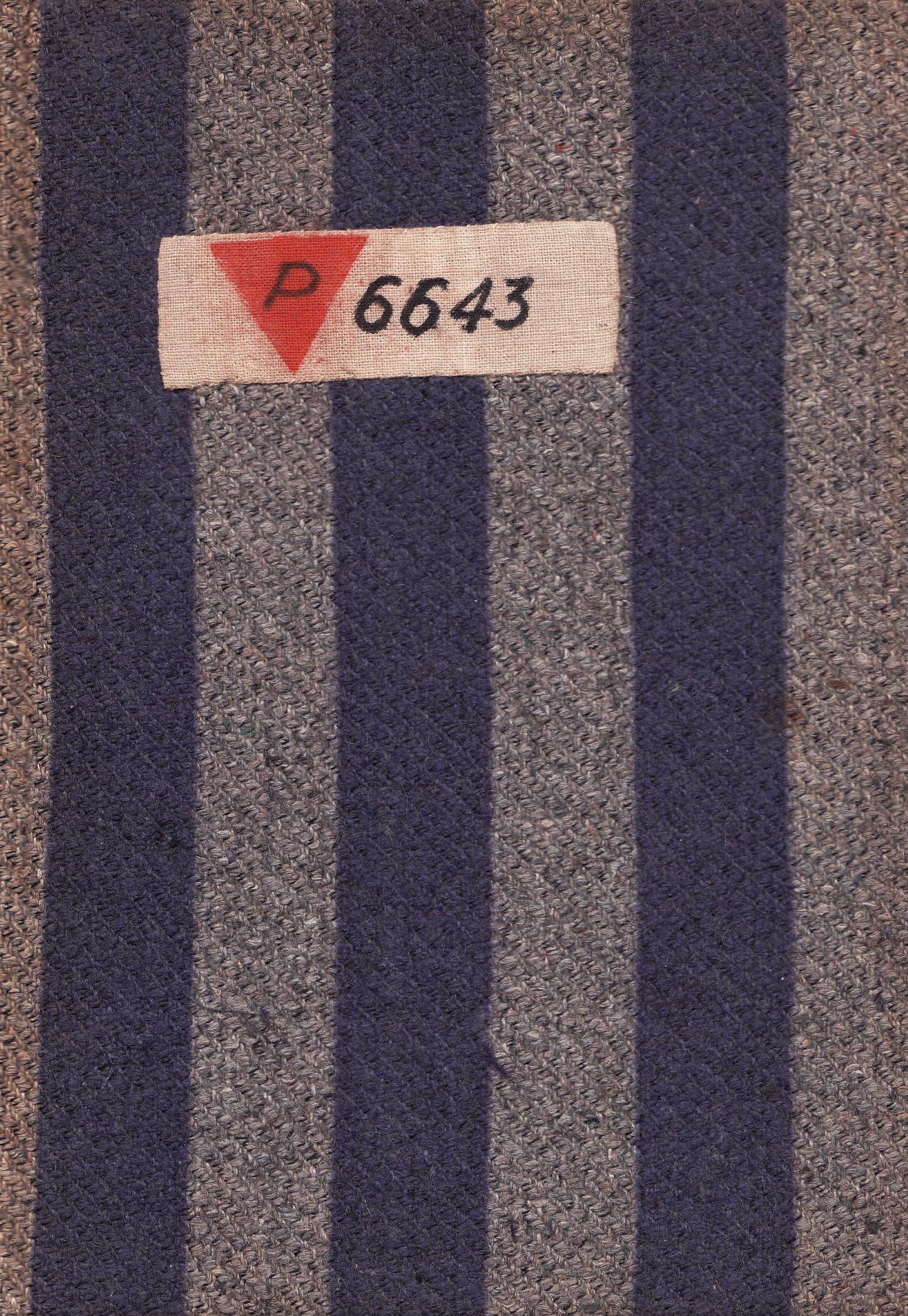
A marking meaning Polish political enemy

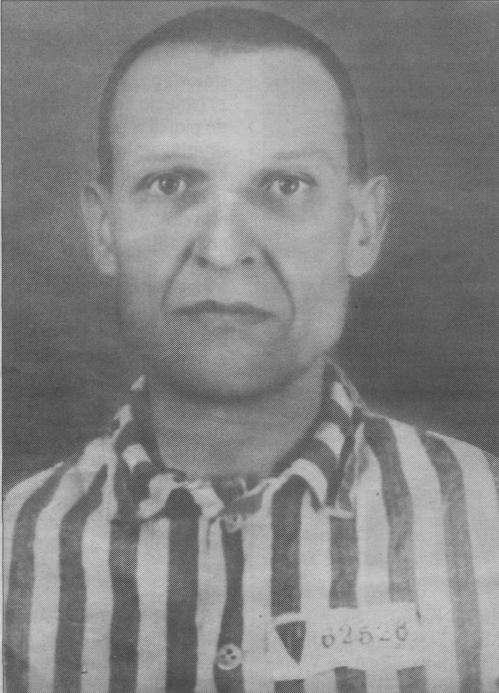
Auschwitz detainee Ignacy Kwarta wears a red P-triangle. (Note: Meaning a Polish political enemy.)

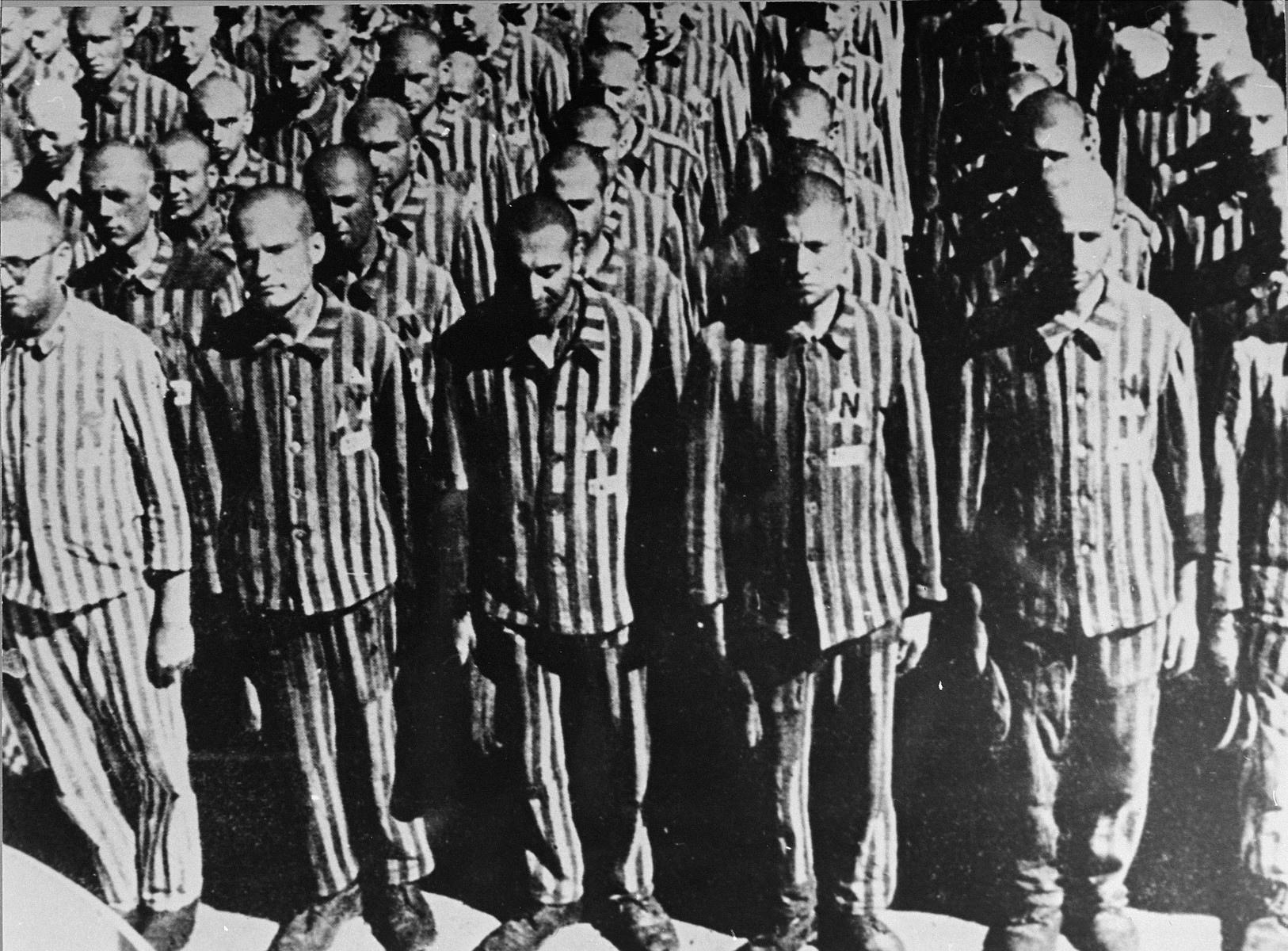
Dutch Jews wearing a yellow star and the letter N for Niederländer at Mauthausen.

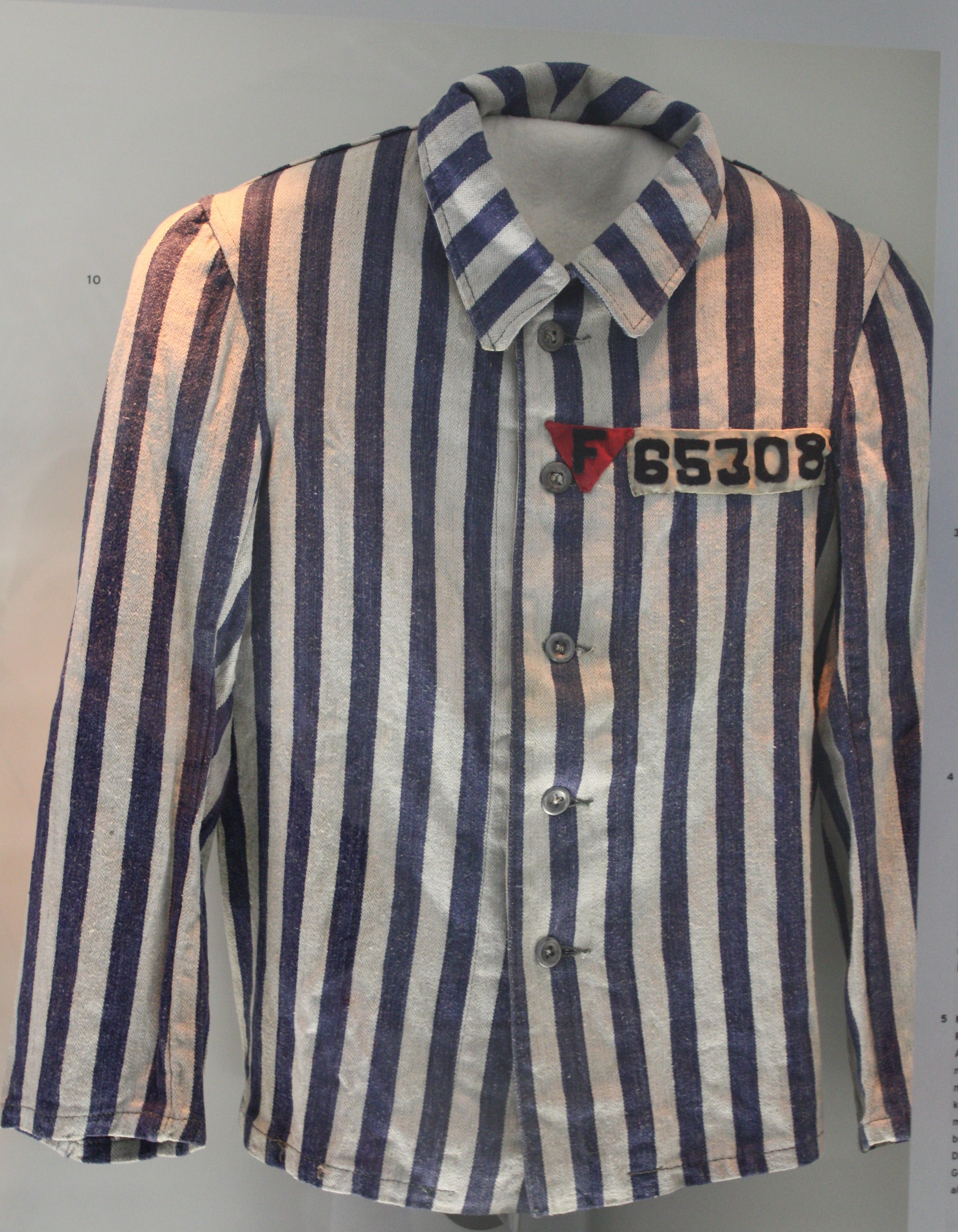
Sachsenhausen-issued red F emblem for a French political enemy

==== Nacht und Nebel ====
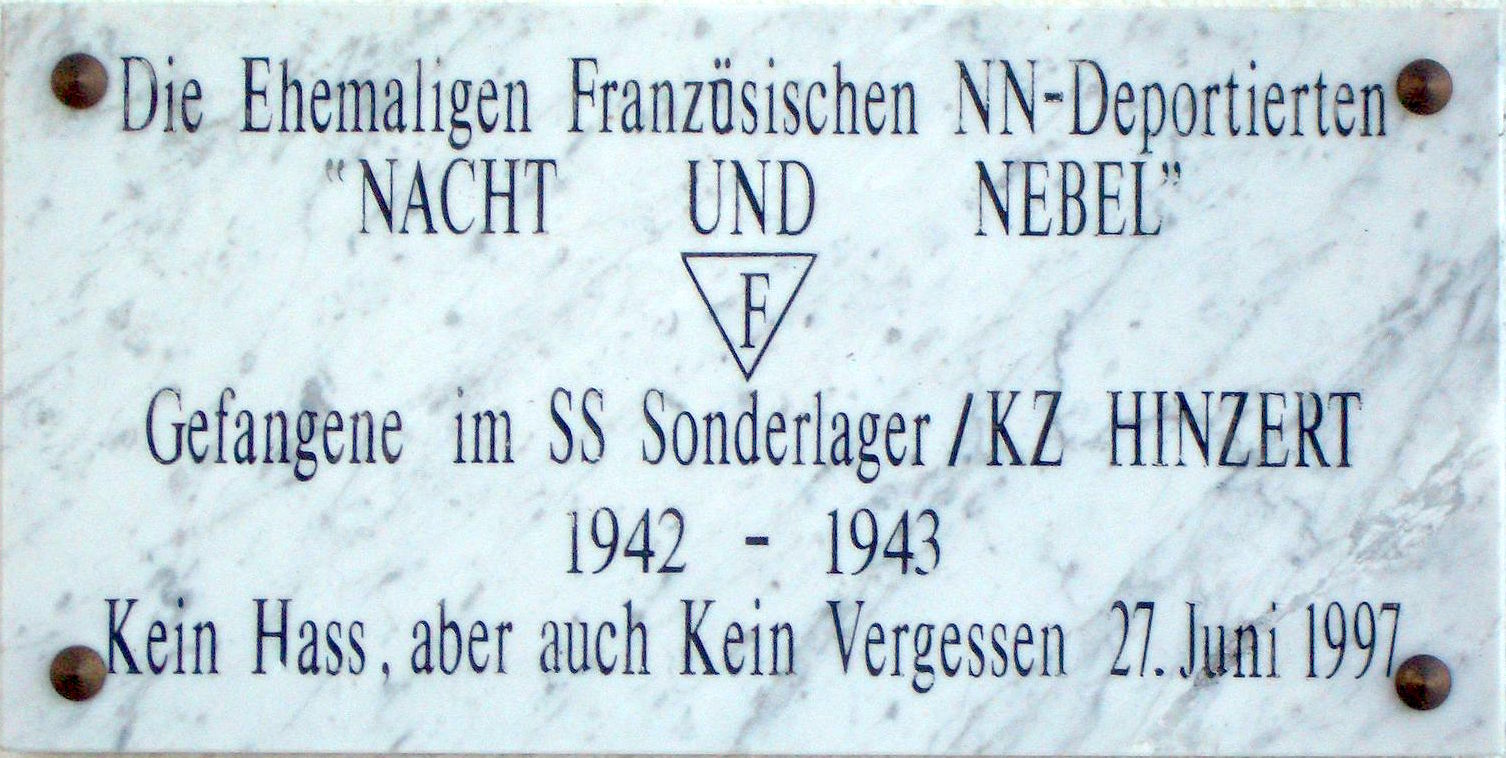
F-triangle at Hinzert honors French victims, especially of the Nacht und Nebel program

Some camps assigned Nacht und Nebel (night and fog) prisoners had them wear two large letters NN in yellow.

==== Reformatory inmates (E or EH) ====
Erziehungshäftlinge (reformatory inmates) wore E or EH in large black letters on a white square. They were made up of intellectuals and respected community members who could organise and lead a resistance movement, suspicious persons picked up in sweeps or stopped at checkpoints, people caught performing conspiratorial activities or acts and inmates who broke work discipline. They were assigned to hard labour for six to eight weeks and were then released. It was hoped that the threat of permanent incarceration at hard labour would deter them from further action.

==== Police inmates (Polizeihäftlinge) ====
Polizeihäftlinge (police inmates), short for Polizeilich Sicherungsverwahrte Häftlinge (police secure custody inmates), wore either PH in large black letters on a white square or the letter S (for Sicherungsverwahrt – secure custody) on a green triangle. To save expense, some camps had them just wear their civilian clothes without markings. Records used the letter PSV (Polizeilich Sicherungsverwahrt) to designate them. They were people awaiting trial by a police court-martial or who were already convicted. They were detained in a special jail barracks until they were executed.

==== Soviet prisoners of war ====
Soviet prisoners of war (russische Kriegsgefangenen) assigned to work camps (Arbeitslager) wore two large letters SU (for sowjetischer Untermensch, meaning Soviet sub-human) in yellow and had vertical stripes painted on their uniforms. They were the few who had not been shot out of hand or died of neglect from untreated wounds, exposure to the elements, or starvation before they could reach a camp. They performed hard labour. Some joined Andrey Vlasov's Liberation Army to fight for Nazi Germany.

==== Labour education detainees (Arbeitserziehung Häftling) ====
Labour education detainees (Arbeitserziehung Häftling) wore a white letter A on their black triangle. This stood for Arbeitsscheuer ("work-shy person"), designating stereotypically "lazy" social undesirables like Gypsies, petty criminals (e.g. prostitutes and pickpockets), alcoholics/drug addicts and vagrants. They were usually assigned to work at labour camps.

== Postwar use ==
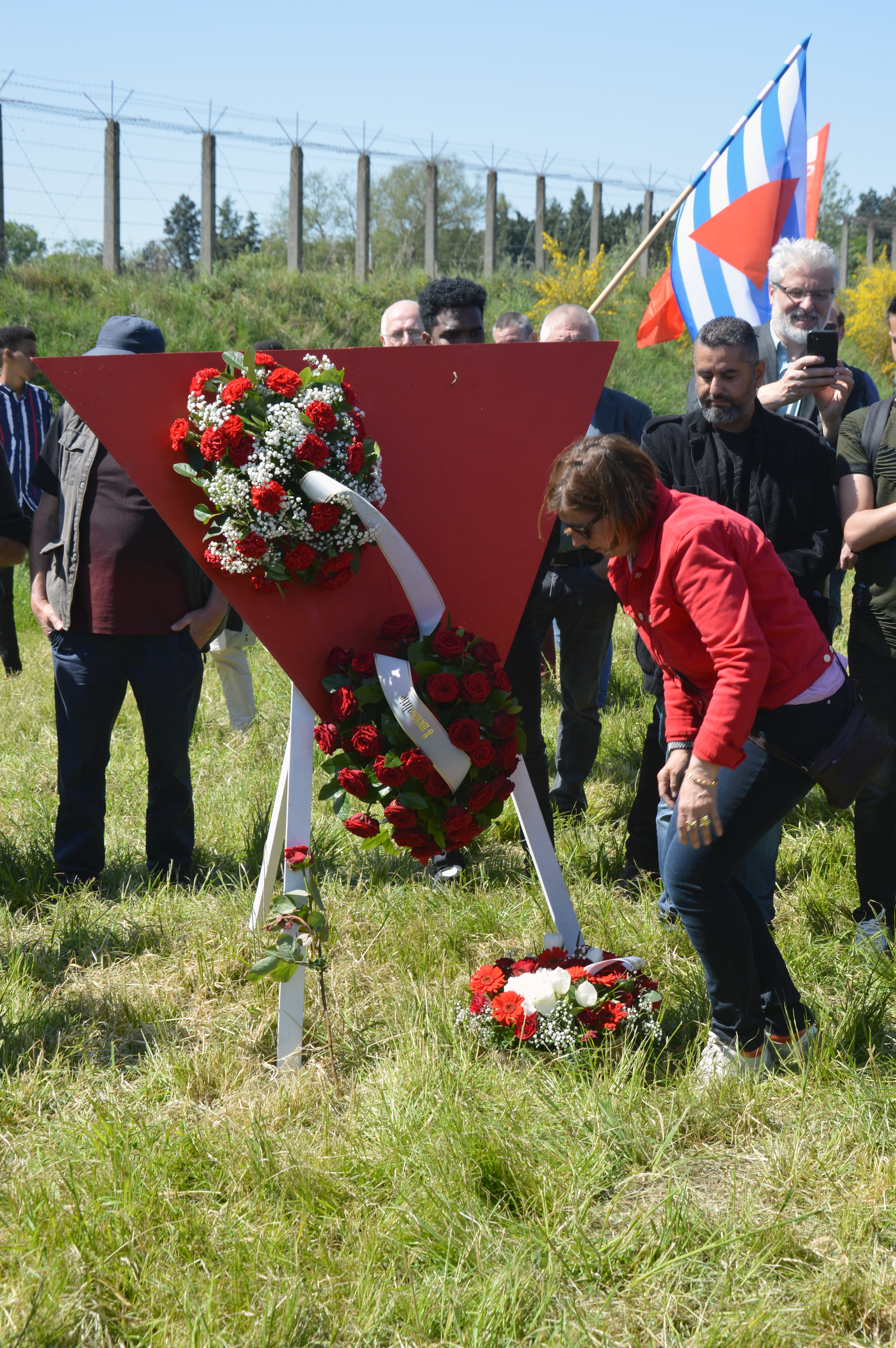
Floral tribute at the red triangle, 8 May 2022, Fort Breendonk.

=== Reclaimed symbols ===
Some of the symbols were reclaimed as symbols of pride after the war. The inverted red, pink, purple, black, and blue triangles have all been reclaimed by various remembrance and anti-fascist groups, particularly in Europe. For example, the Association of Persecutees of the Nazi Regime – Federation of Antifascists (VVN-BdA) and other members of the International Federation of Resistance Fighters – Association of Anti-Fascists use the red triangle as part of their emblem. The pink triangle has been used worldwide since the 1970s. The red inverted triangle has been mostly used in Europe.

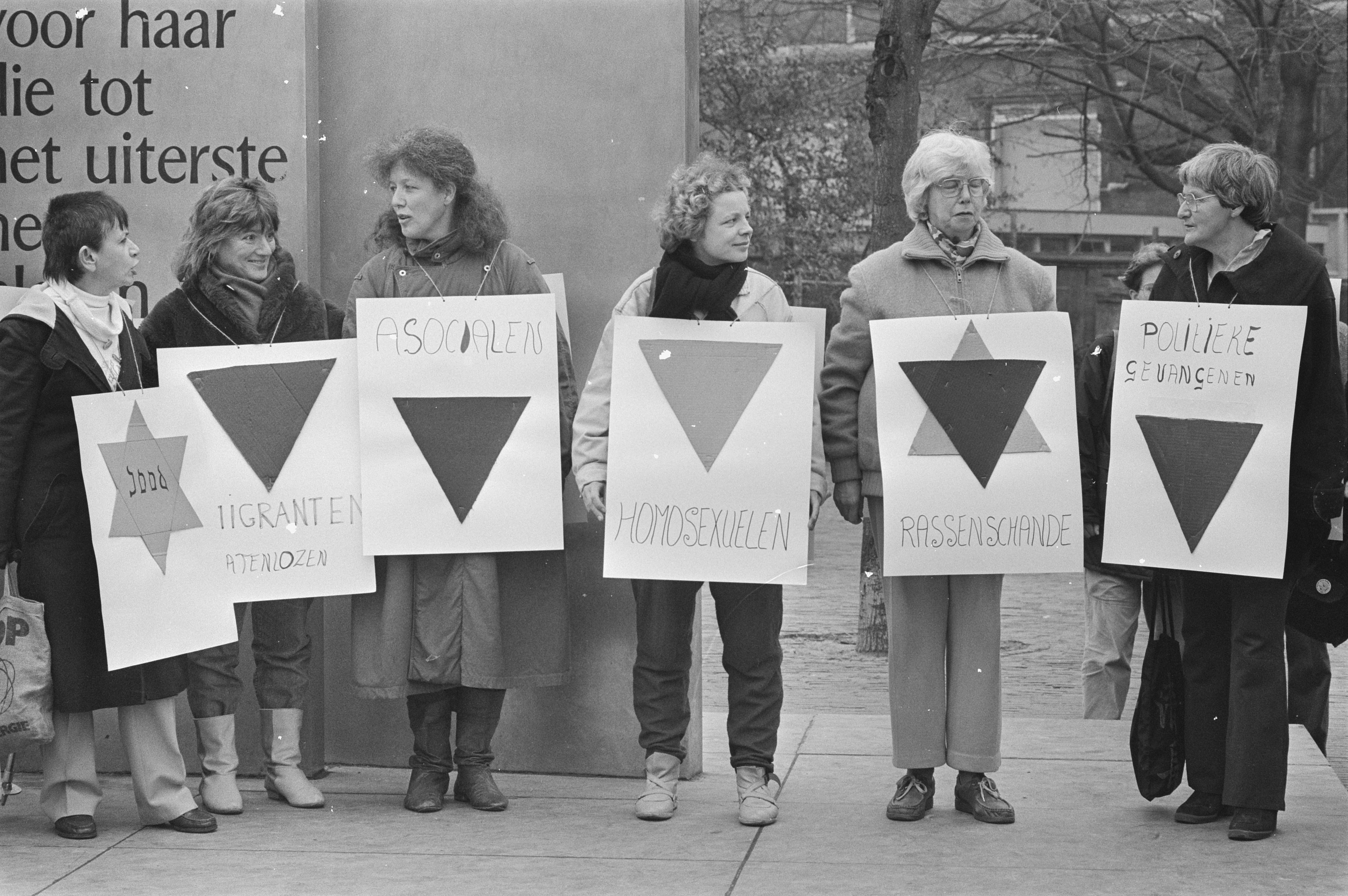
Women with symbols of all persecuted groups on International Women's Day (8 March) at the Ravensbrück monument in Amsterdam in 1985.

=== Memorials ===
Triangle-motifs appear on many postwar memorials to the victims of the Nazis. Most triangles are plain while some others bear nationality-letters. The otherwise potentially puzzling designs are a direct reference to the identification patches used in the camps. On such monuments, typically an inverted triangle (especially if red) evokes all victims, including also the non-Jewish victims like Poles and other Slavs, communists, homosexuals, Roma and Sinti (see Porajmos), people with disability (see Action T4), Soviet POWs and Jehovah's Witnesses. An inverted triangle coloured pink would symbolize gay male victims. A non-inverted (base down, point up) triangle and/or a yellow triangle is generally more evocative of the Jewish victims.

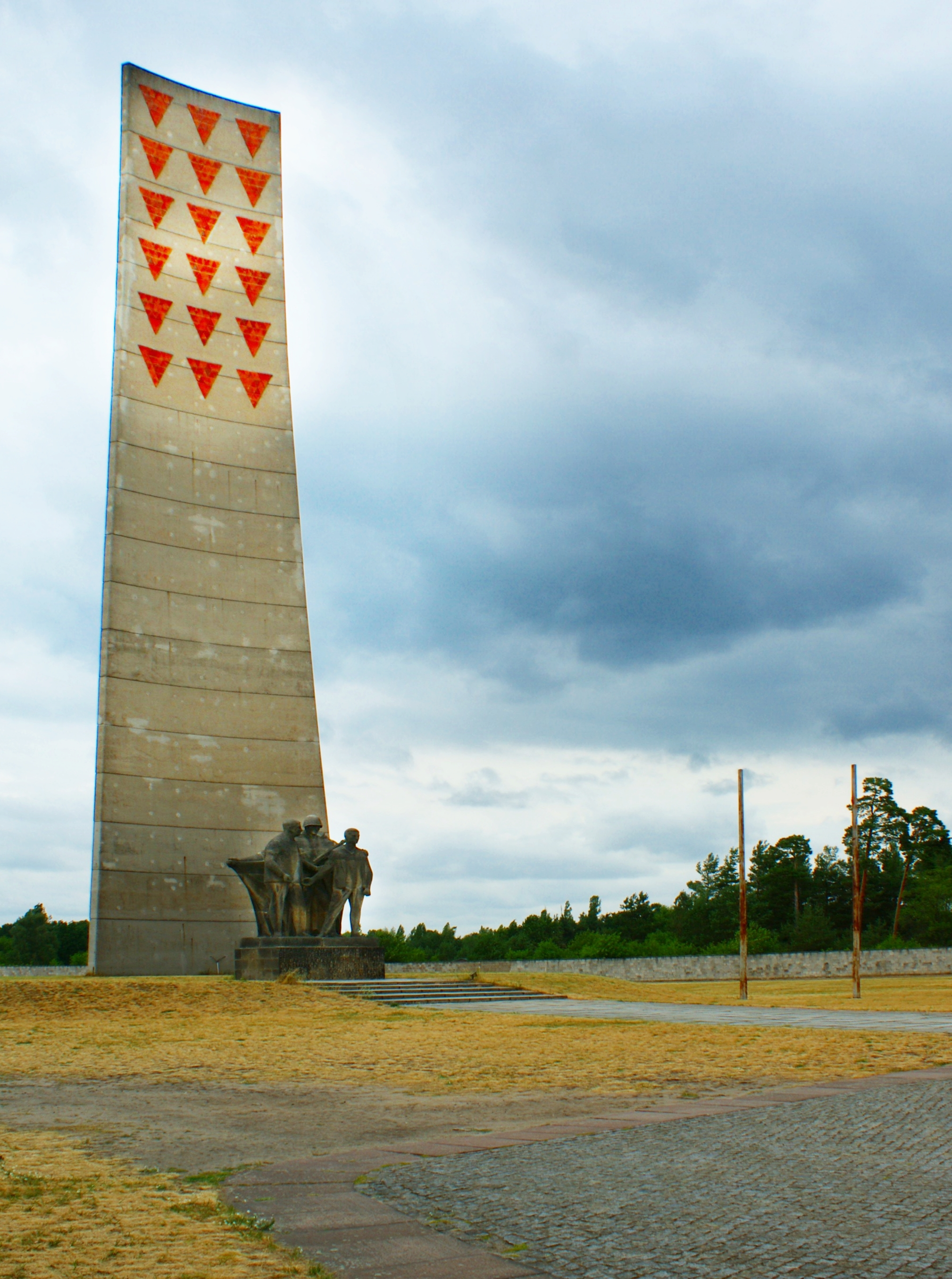
Sachsenhausen memorial

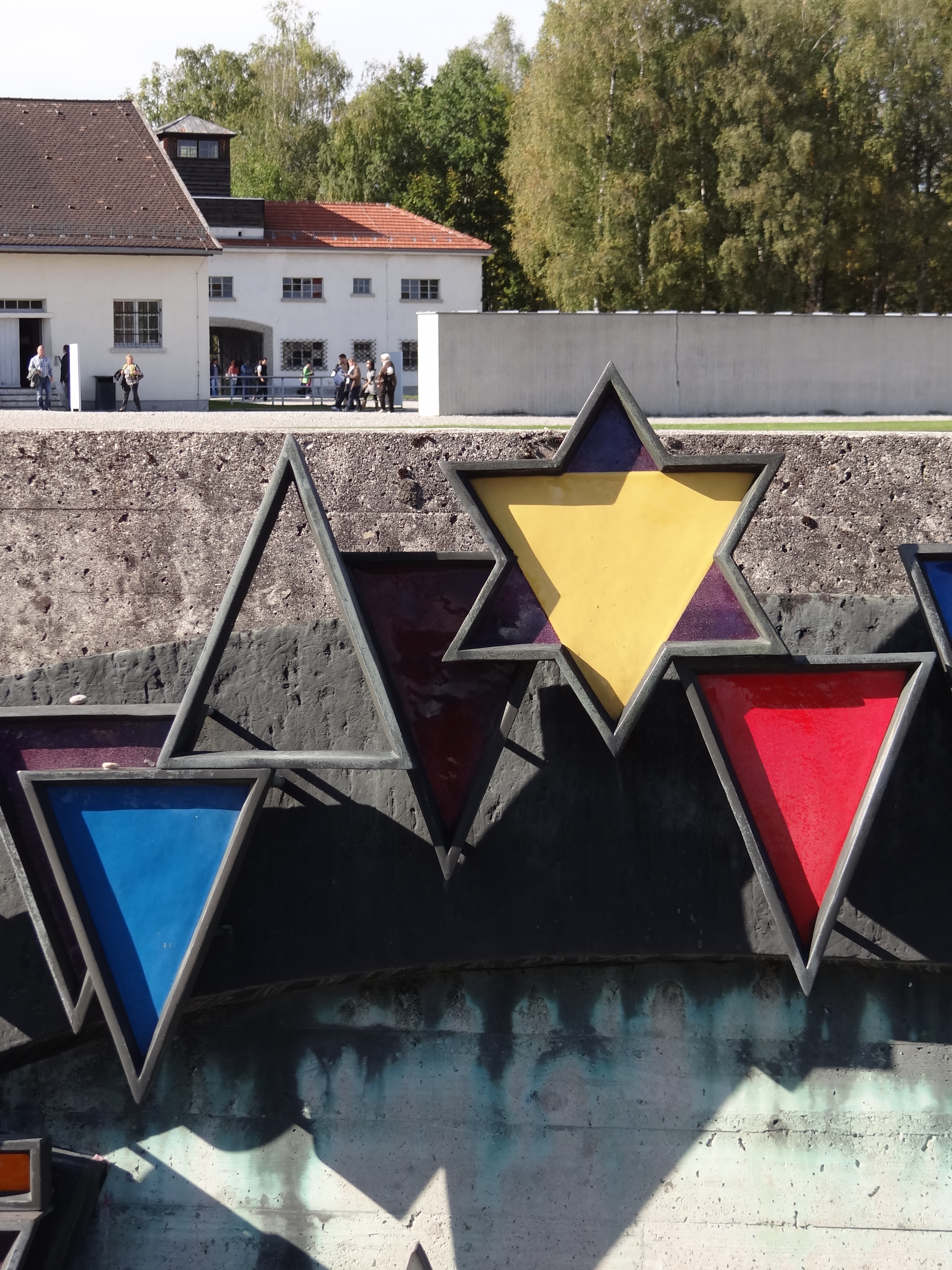
Various badges on a Dachau memorial.

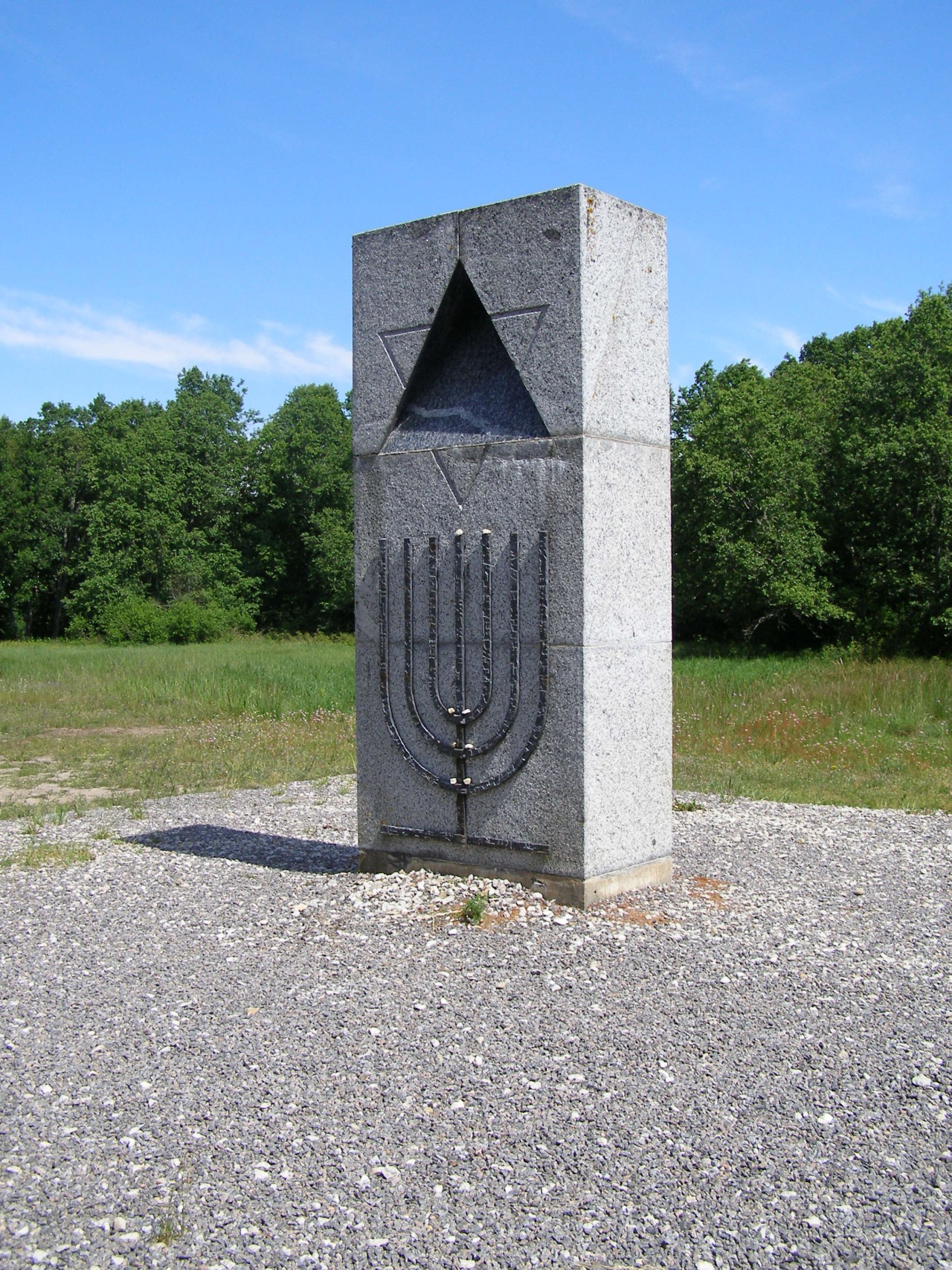
On the Klooga Jewish victims' memorial

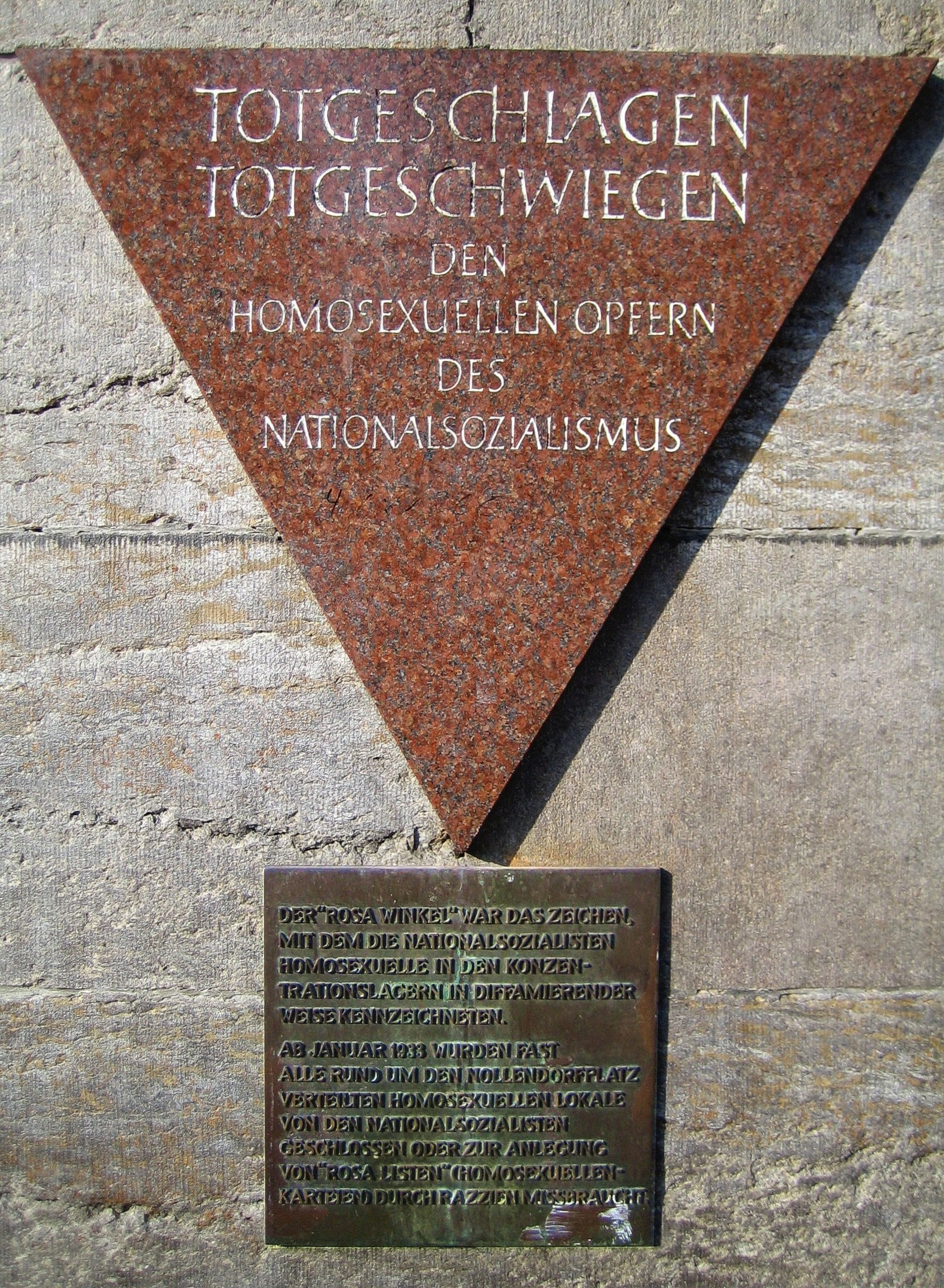
Pink triangle plaque honouring gay victims, a subway station in Berlin.

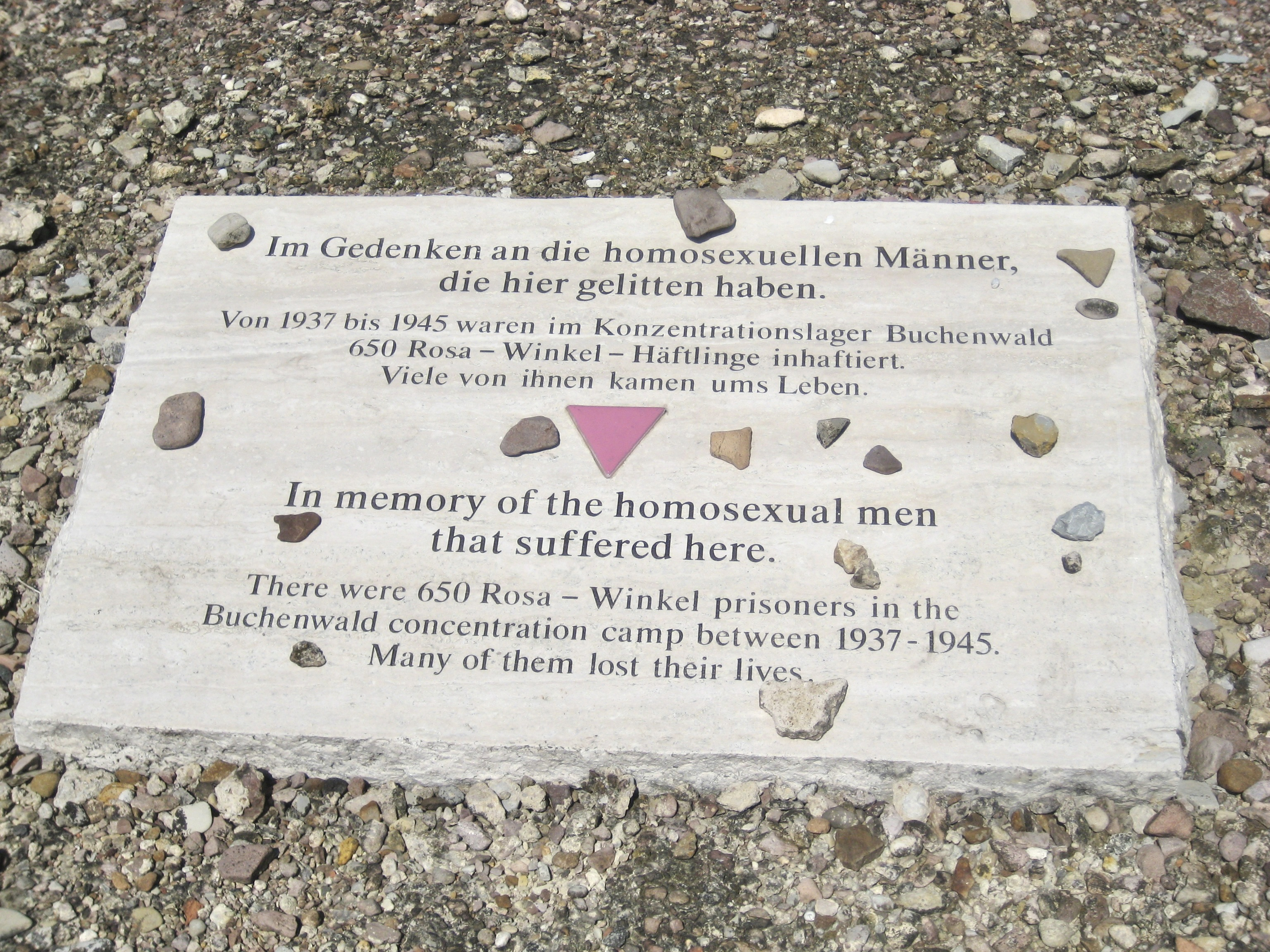
Pink triangle (Rosa Winkel in German) memorial for gay men killed at Buchenwald

=== Red inverted triangles in political symbols ===
VVN-BdA

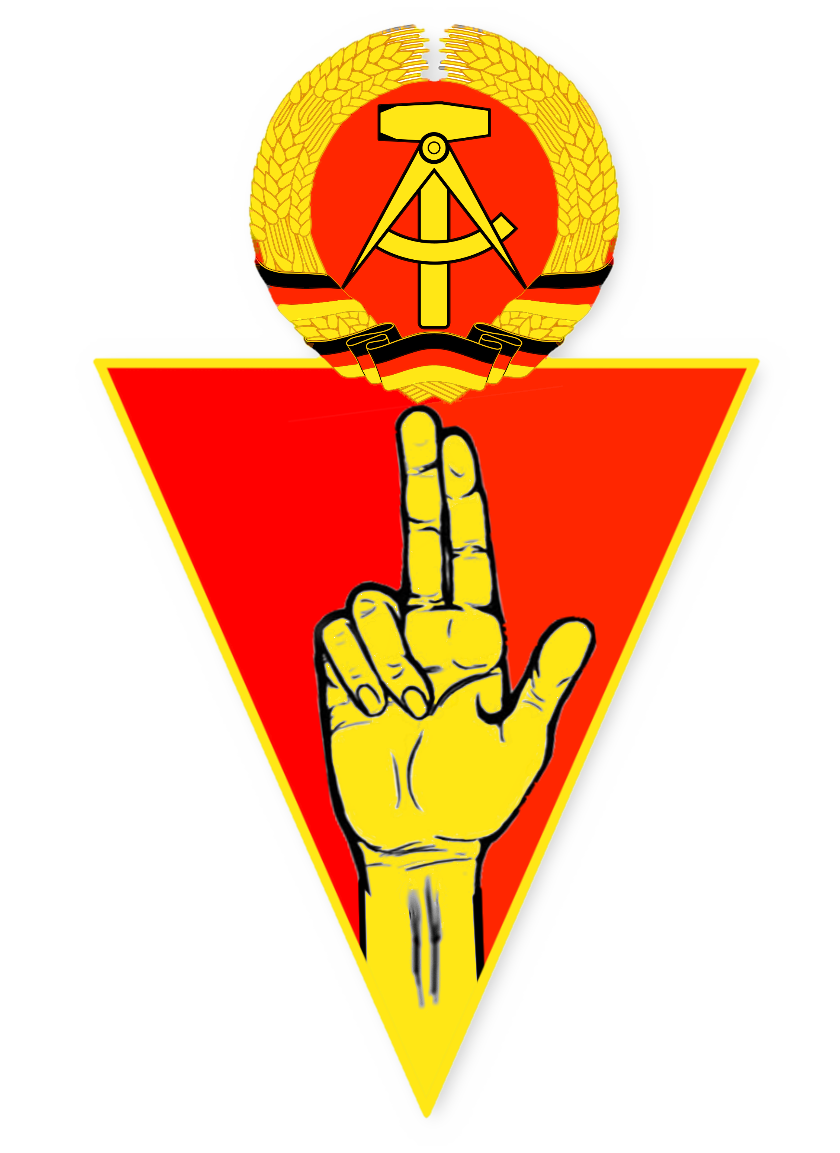
KdAW

==== Early organizations in post-war Germany ====
One of the first was Committees for the Victims of Fascism (German: OdF-Ausschüsse).

The Association of Persecutees of the Nazi Regime – Federation of Antifascists (VVN‑BdA) was founded in West Germany soon after the end of World War Two.

The Committee of Antifascist Resistance Fighters (KdAW) (Note: German: Komitee der antifaschistischen Widerstandskämpfer.) was formed in 1953. It functioned as the East German counterpart of the VVN (German: Vereinigung der Verfolgten des Naziregimes, lit. 'Union of Persecutees of the Nazi Regime'). The KdAW played an important role in the commemoration of German resistance to Nazism and The Holocaust in East Germany. East Germany utilised such commemorative functions to emphasise the anti-fascist orientation of the state. It also included survivors of concentration camps, former prisoners of Brandenburg-Görden Prison, veterans of the International Brigades of the Spanish Civil War, and others.

==== Other groups who use the red inverted triangle ====
ANED (Note: Italian: Associazione nazionale ex deportati nei campi nazisti, lit. 'National Association of Former Nazi Camp Deportees'.)

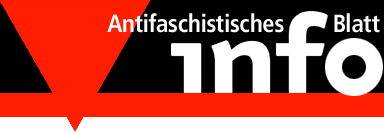
Antifaschistisches Infoblatt

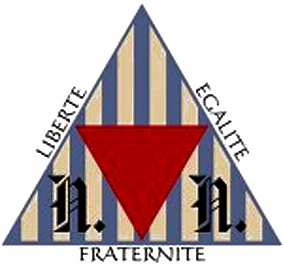
Respectable Loge Liberté Chérie

- National Association of Former Nazi Camp Deportees (ANED) Italian: Associazione nazionale ex deportati nei campi nazisti
- Anti-Fascist Action in the United Kingdom used the symbol in badges in the 80s, the one example showed the pointed red shape smashing a black swastika.
- Antifaschistisches Infoblatt (AIB) is an anti-fascist publication in Berlin, Germany.
- Liberté chérie (French for "Cherished Liberty") was a Masonic Lodge founded in 1943 by imprisoned freemasons, from the Belgian resistance, at Esterwegen concentration camp. It was one of the few lodges of Freemasons founded within a Nazi concentration camp during the Second World War. (see also: Persecution of Freemasons § Nazi Germany and occupied Europe and Grand Anti-Masonic Exhibition)
- NIKA (German: Nationalismus ist keine Alternative, lit. 'Nationalism is not an alternative') was started in Germany in response to the rise of Germany's far-right party, the AfD (German: Alternative für Deutschland, lit. 'Alternative for Germany').
- Qassam Brigades (Arabic: كتئب القسام, romanized: Kataeb al-Qassam) have used an inverted red triangle (Arabic: المثلث الأحمر المقلوب) in their propaganda videos since November 2023. The inverted red triangle was later included in the logo of their Military Media division. Qassam differ from most of the other groups by being religious and nationalist. Most media have said Qassam's symbol has different origins (see below).
- Ras l'front (RLF, English: "Fed up") use an inverted red triangle in some of their modern logos. For example: RLF Voiron.
- Territoires de la Mémoire (Territories of Memory) and Triangle Rouge (Red Triangle) are Belgian organisations who promote the use of the red triangle as a symbol of anti-fascism and anti-racism. (Note: Note: as of 2023-06-08 their page-long French language definition of Anti-Semitism made no mention of either Israel or Zionism, see also: IHRA definition of antisemitism.) (See also: Avenue Louise § World War II)
- United Left (Spanish: Izquierda Unida), Spain. Their membership cards feature a red, green, and purple triangle. Their Madrid office tweeted in 2021, "🔻The red triangle that we, the members of @IzquierdaUnida, wear on our lapels and in our Twitter handles commemorates the political prisoners in Nazi camps. It is an honor to share this symbol with other oppressed groups whose Holocaust we remember today".

===== The Red Wedge and other origins =====
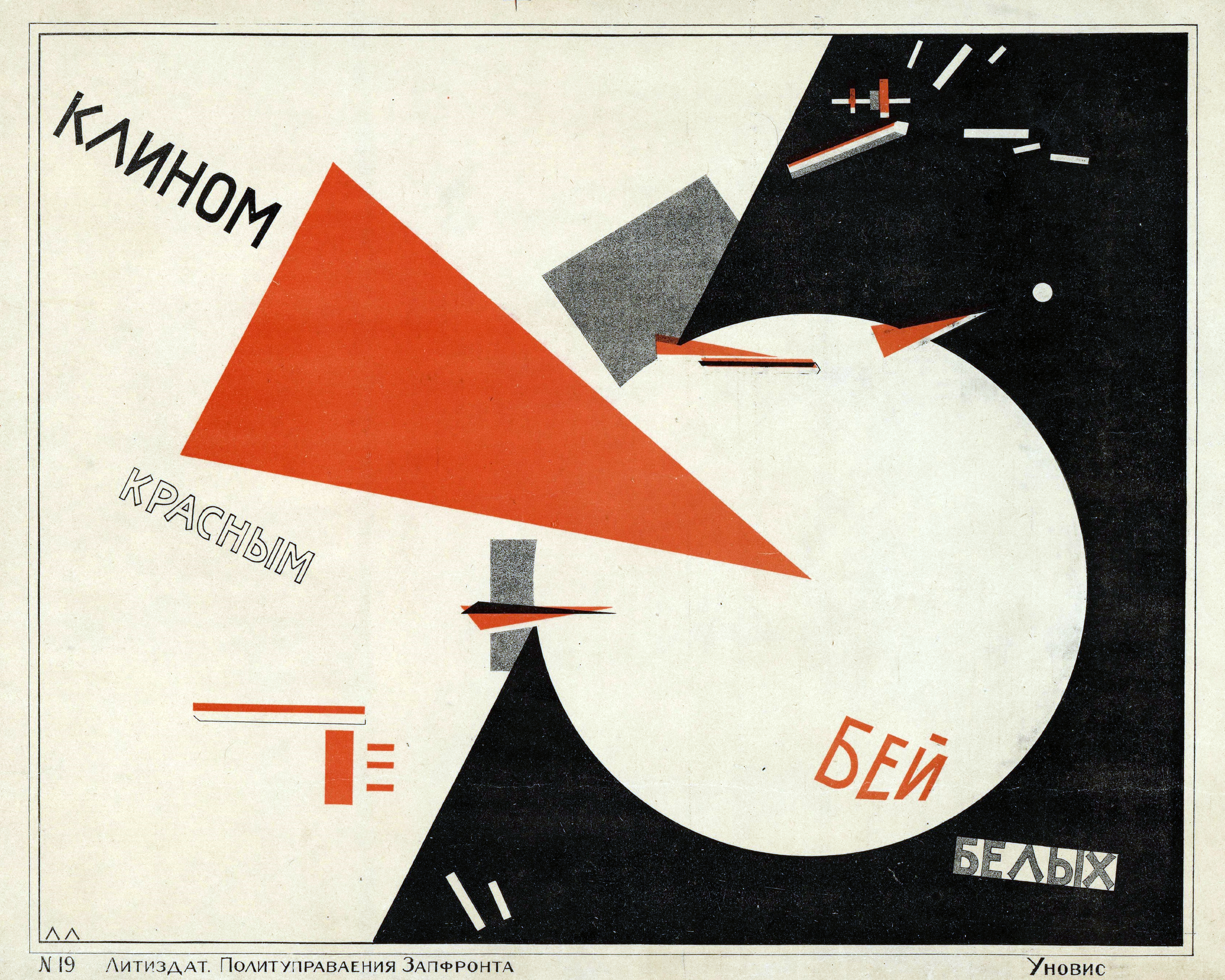
Beat the Whites with the Red Wedge, El Lissitzky, 1919

The simplicity of the red and pink triangles means the origin is sometimes ambiguous or disputed. Some of the above, such as Anti-Fascist Action, also resemble the red wedge from the 1919 Russian revolutionary propaganda poster Beat the Whites with the Red Wedge by El Lissitzky. They are used somewhat interchangeably. The above are all used for an explicitly anti-Nazi, anti-fascist, or pro-resistance meaning. Some sources have said that Qassam's symbol originates from the Palestinian flag. The implied anti-Nazi and explicitly pro-resistance meaning of Qassam's using the symbol used to honour WWII resistance is controversial. Palestinian resistance is often labelled as terrorism by allies of the United States. (Note: Such as Japan, the United Kingdom, Canada, and Australia.) Qassam, and their civilian political wing (Hamas), have referred to the military forces occupying Palestine as Nazis since their founding documents; this was omitted in the revised version, which was much shorter.

=== Medals and honours ===
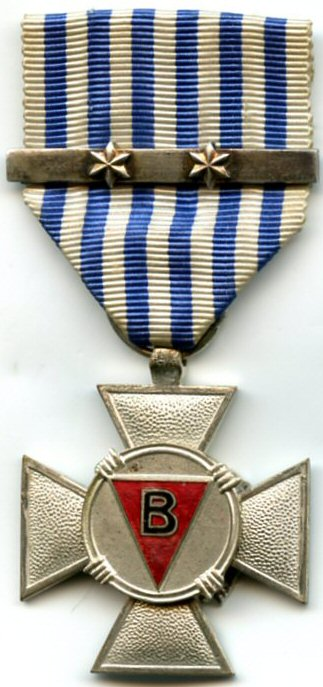
Belgian Political Prisoner's Cross

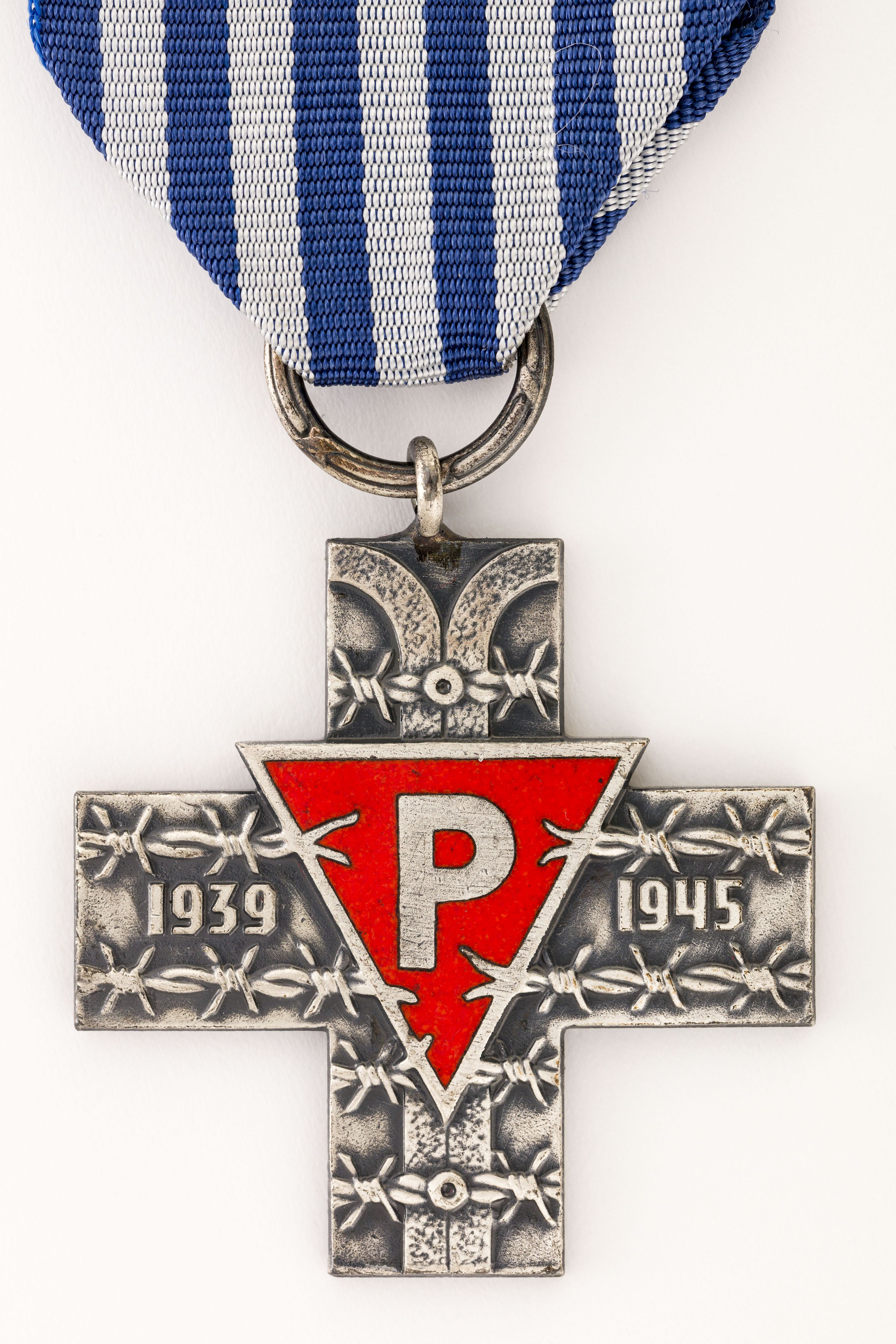
"P" on Poland's Auschwitz Cross

Service medals awarded to prisoners of war and other camp inmates after WWII feature the triangle that was used on prisoners' uniforms. Some also include the blue stripe of the prisoner uniforms as the ribbon design. The Auschwitz Cross, a Polish medal for camp victims and the Political Prisoner's Cross 1940–1945, a Belgian medal both show a red triangle with a nationality indicator, and the ribbons replicate the striped fabric of some camp uniforms.

==== Political Prisoner's Cross (Belgium) ====
The Political Prisoner's Cross 1940–1945 (French: Croix du Prisonnier Politique 1940–1945, Dutch: Politieke Gevangenkruis 1940–1945) was a Belgian war medal established by royal decree of the Regent on 13 November 1947 and awarded to Belgian citizens arrested and interned by the Germans as political prisoners during the Second World War. The award's statute included provisions for posthumous award should the intended recipient not survive detention, and the right of the widow, the mother or the father of the deceased to wear the cross.

==== Medal of the KdAW (East Germany, 1975) ====
From 1975 onwards, the Deutsche Demokratische Republik (DDR, also known as East Germany) released a medal for the "Committee of Antifascist Resistance Fighters" (KdAW, German: Komitee der Antifaschistischen Widerstandskämpfer) of the GDR that included a red triangle. It was named German: Medaille des Komitees der antifaschistischen Widerstadskämpfer der DDR, lit. 'Medal of the Committee of Anti-fascist Resistance Fighters of East Germany'. They also had an anti-fascist medal with a different design, membership in the KdAW made one eligible to receive the Medal for Fighters Against Fascism.

==== Auschwitz Cross (Poland) ====
The Auschwitz Cross (Polish: Krzyż Oświęcimski), instituted on 14 March 1985, was a Polish decoration awarded to honour survivors of Nazi German concentration camps, including Auschwitz. Auschwitz is a German name for the Polish town Oświęcim, where a complex of concentration camps was built by Nazi Germany during the German occupation of Europe during WWII. It was awarded generally to Poles, but it was possible to award it to foreigners in special cases. It could be awarded posthumously. It ceased to be awarded in 1999. An exception was made in the case of Greta Ferušić, who was awarded it in February 2004. Some of the people awarded the medal were Jewish, including Szymon Kluger (Shimson Kleuger).

=== LGBTQ symbols (1990s onwards) ===
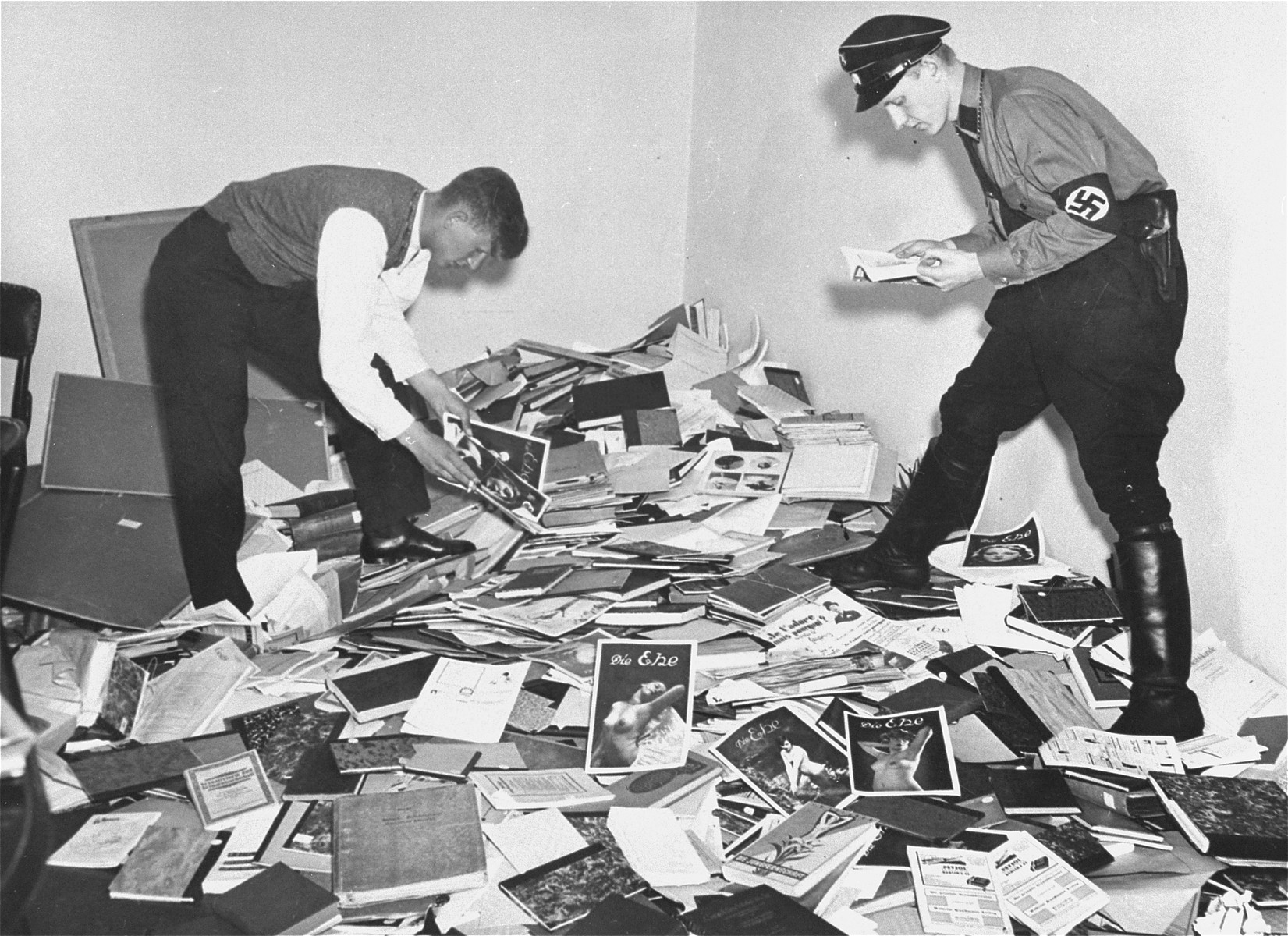
The photographs of Sturmabteilung raid on the Institute for Sex Research, on 6 May 1933 are iconic images of the prosecution of gay and transgender people by Nazi Germany.

Stories of queer holocaust victims were largely ignored until the 1990s. There have been numerous variants, including the Silence=Death Project logo, usually a re-inverted symbols that point upright. Historically, the pink triangle was mostly used to mark gay men, but the Nazi party also persecuted transgender people, gender non-conforming people, and lesbians. Gender non-conforming men were labelled with the pink triangle, while women (including lesbians) who did not conform to Nazi gender norms and nationalist pronatalism were usually labelled with the black triangle. Some lesbians were prominent in the original resistance, and thus they were labelled with the red triangle, such as Yvonne Ziegler and Suzanne Leclézio.

Silence Equals Death

The biangles symbol of bisexuality (Note: designed by Liz Nania)

"Safe space" symbol: pink triangle in a green circle

Equality Michigan

==== LGBTQ Holocaust memorials ====
Memorials to the Queer victims, many of which feature the pink triangle were not erected until recently, most in the 21st century. The monument in Sydney was erected in 2001, and in Berlin (above) in 2008.

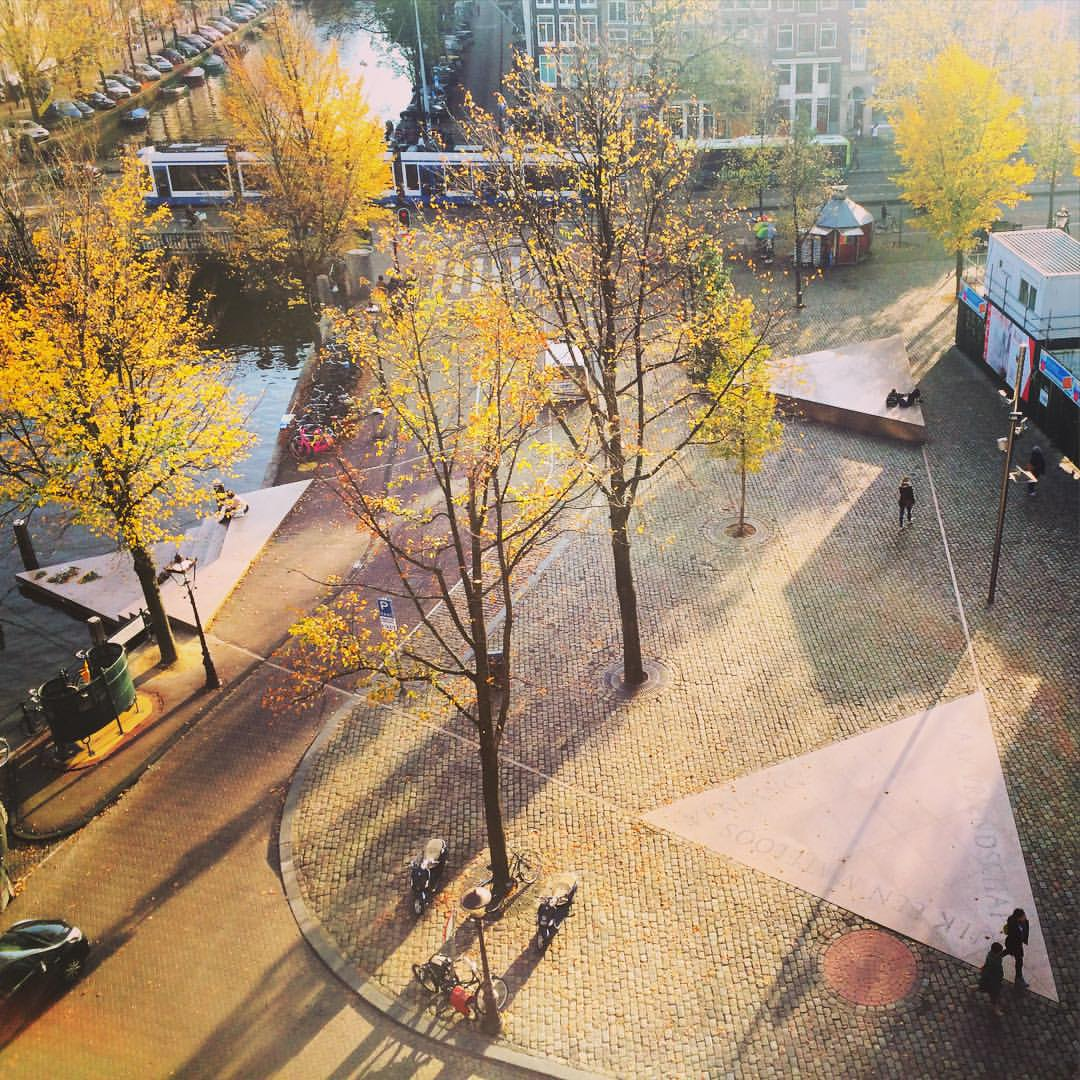
Amsterdam's Homomonument. (Note: uses three pink triangles symbolically to memorialize gay men killed in the Holocaust other victims of anti-gay violence.)

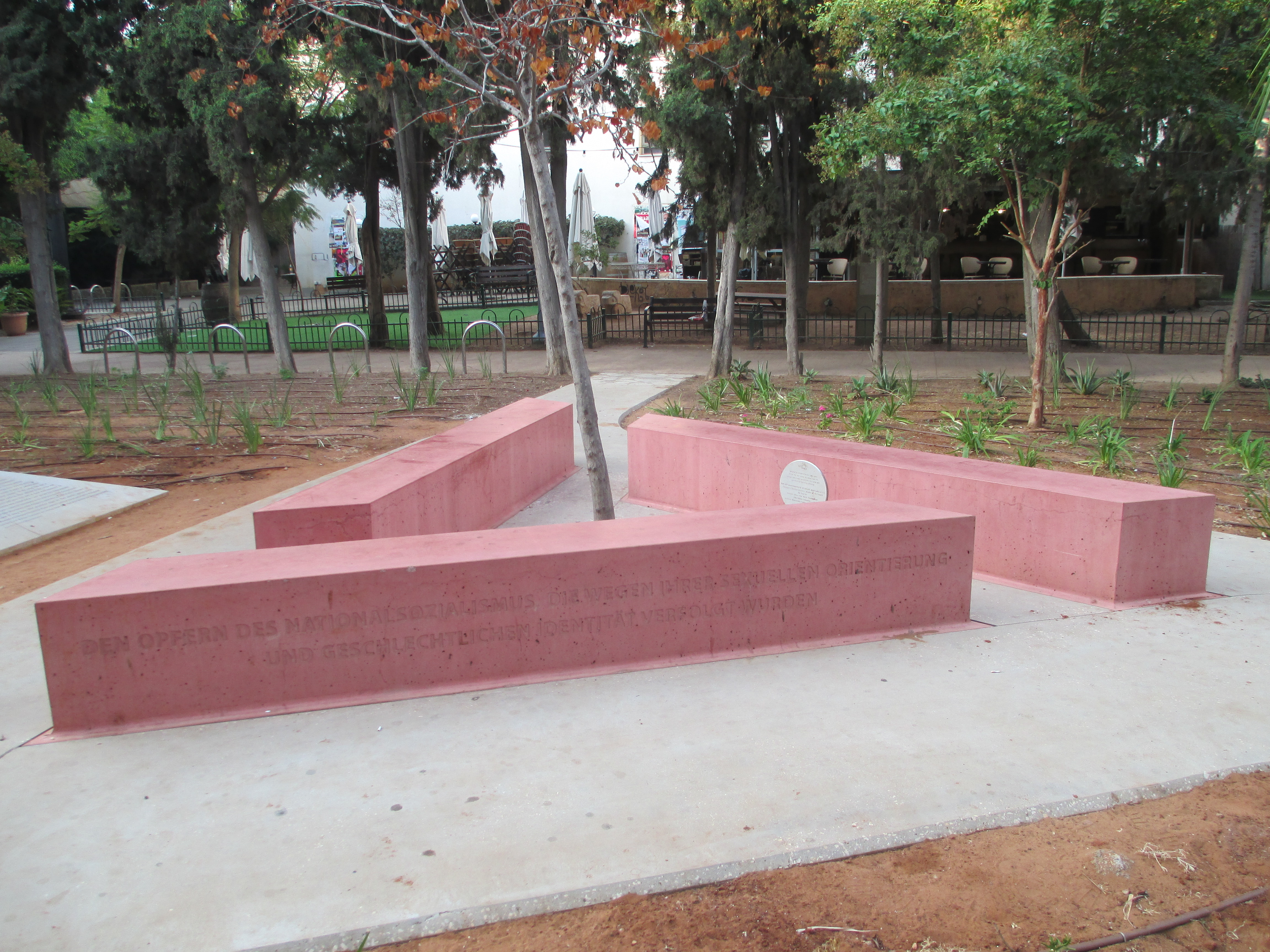
Monument to the Gays and Lesbians Persecuted in the Holocaust in Tel Aviv. (Note: Constructed in January 2014. See also: Tel Aviv Pride and Lehava.)

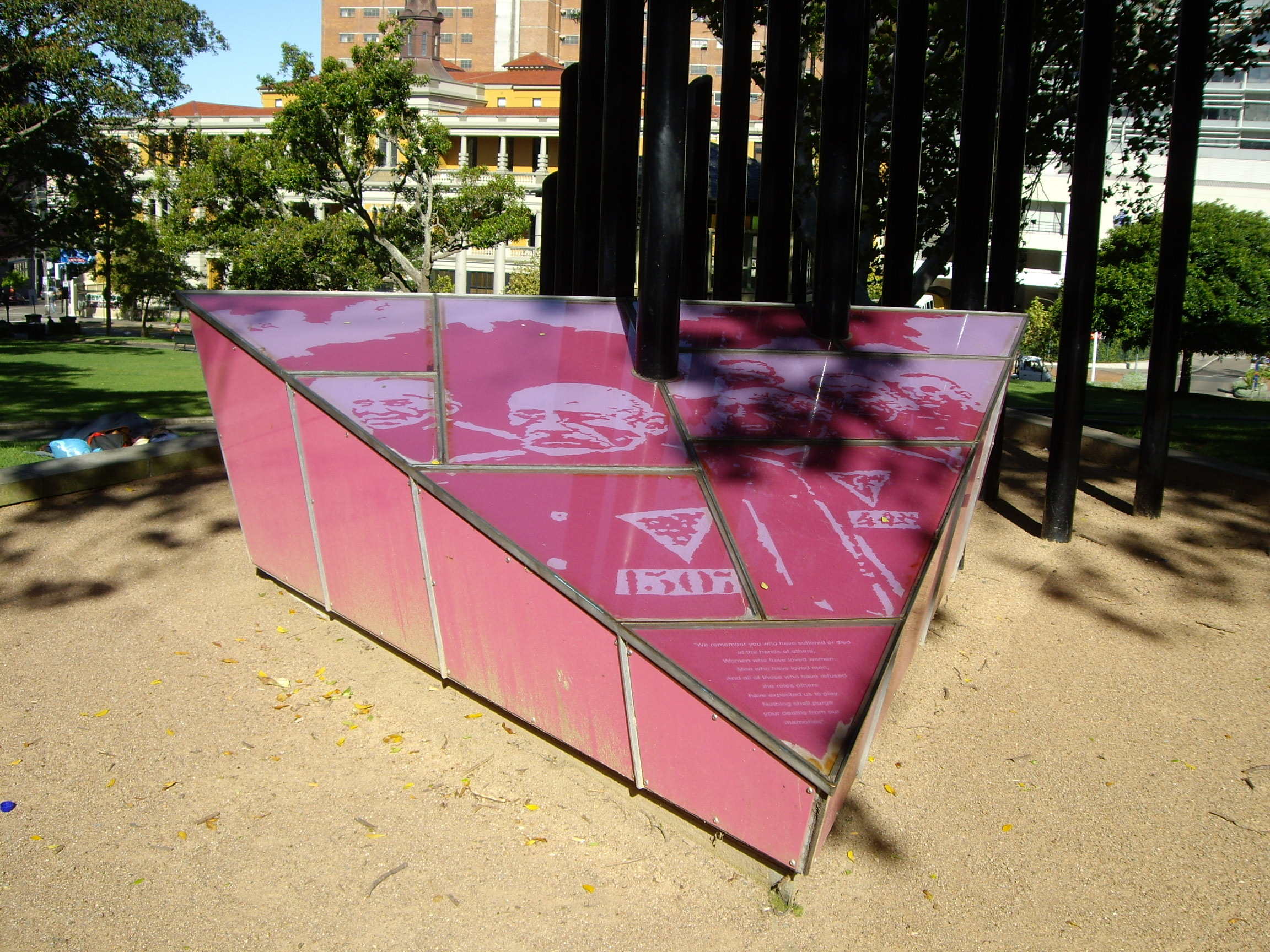
The Sydney Gay and Lesbian Holocaust Memorial. (Note: LGBTQ history in Sydney, Australia: Gay gang murders and Sydney Gay and Lesbian Mardi Gras.)

=== Red triangle lapel pins in 21st Century Europe ===
In 2020, Spanish politicians Pablo Iglesias (Second Deputy Prime Minister of Spain) and Alberto Garzón (Ministry of Consumer Affairs) wore red triangle lapel pins while being sworn into government by the King of Spain. Alberto Garzón has been wearing the symbol since 2016.

Red inverted triangle lapel pins are widely distributed Western European countries. Red triangle pins are worn by socialist, communist, and other left-wing or far-left politicians in countries such as Belgium, Spain, and France.

Left-wing French presidential candidate Jean-Luc Mélenchon wore a red triangle lapel pin during his campaign, the message was particularly aimed at diffentiating himself from far-right National Front candidate Marine Le Pen (daughter of the party's even more controversial founder, Jean-Marie Le Pen).

Jean-Luc Mélenchon explained the meaning of the symbol, "I have been compared to the National Front. I was outraged. I said to myself, what could I wear? And someone, a Belgian, a comrade, said to me, 'Listen, I'll give you mine, it's the insignia of the communist deportees in the Nazi concentration camps'. And so I said: 'now I'm putting it on, I'm not taking it off' ... We forget this moment in history. But the first to be deported and massacred were the communists..."

French politician Ugo Bernalicis, from the Left Party (previously from the Socialist Party), represents the department of Nord, in the French National Assembly. Bernalicis was born into a family close to the communist movement, with a militant father, an elected grandfather and a great-grandfather who was deported to the Dachau concentration camp because of his political convictions.

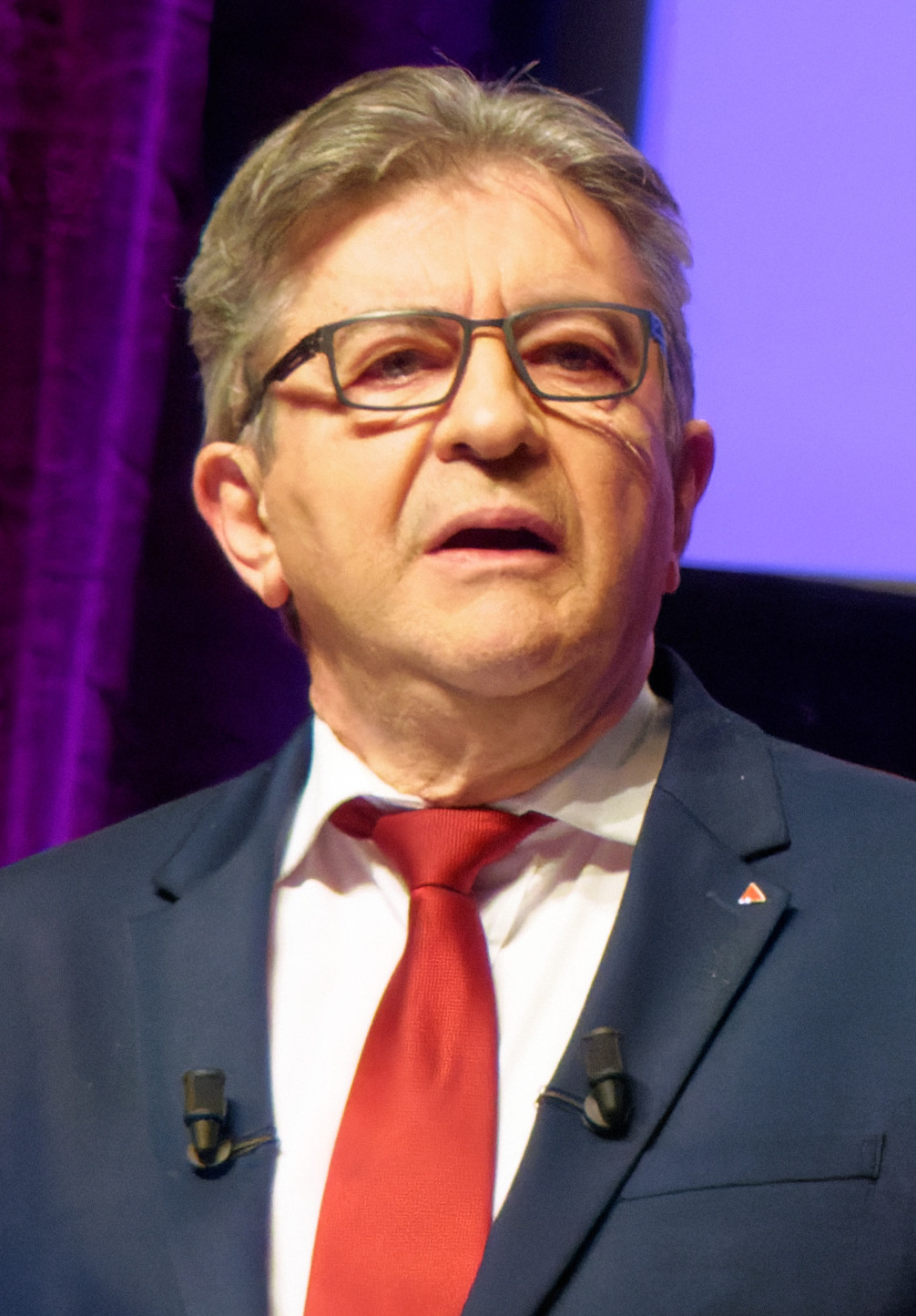
Jean-Luc Mélenchon (photo 2022)

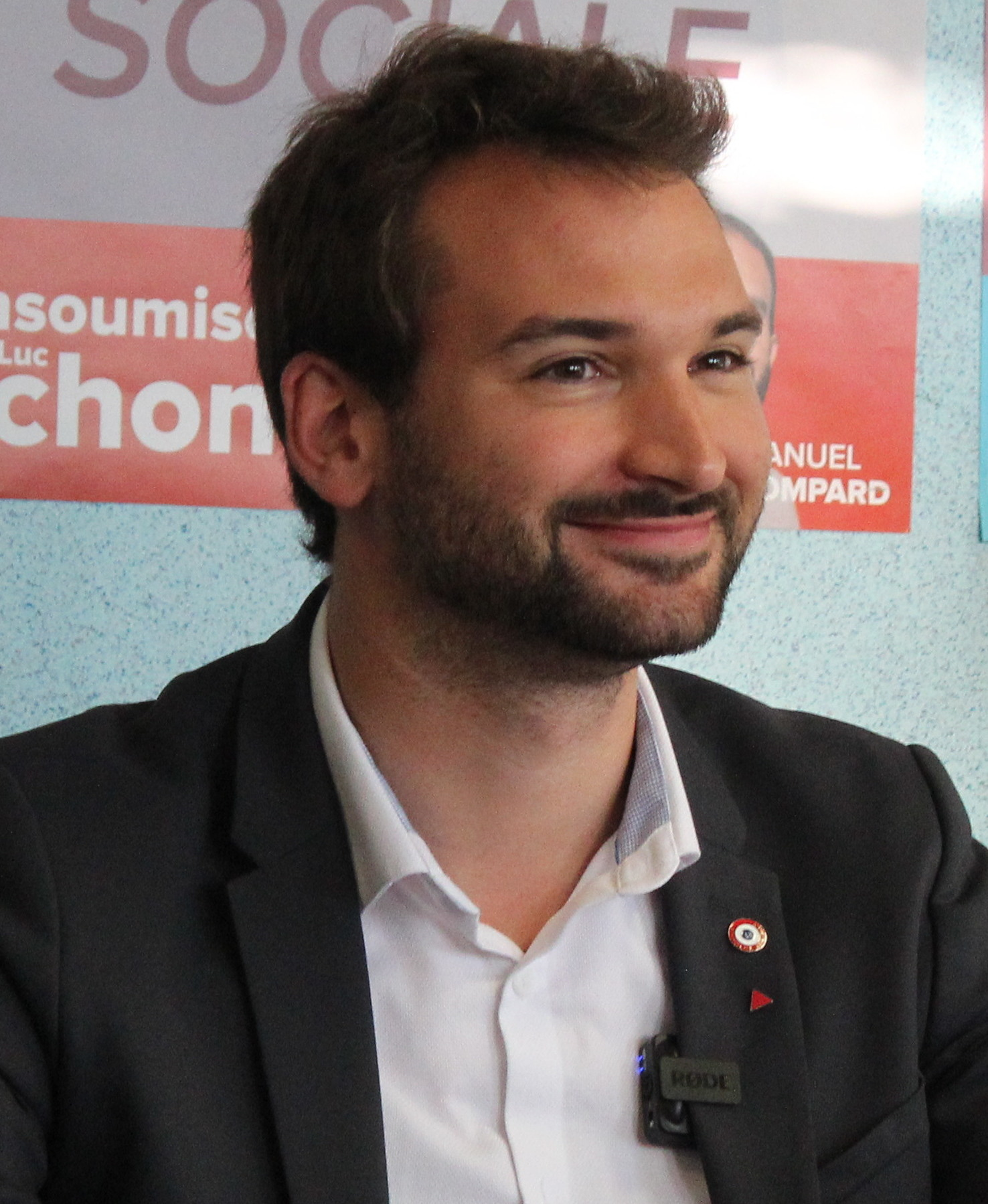
Ugo Bernalicis, Left Party, Nord, French National Assembly (photo 2019)

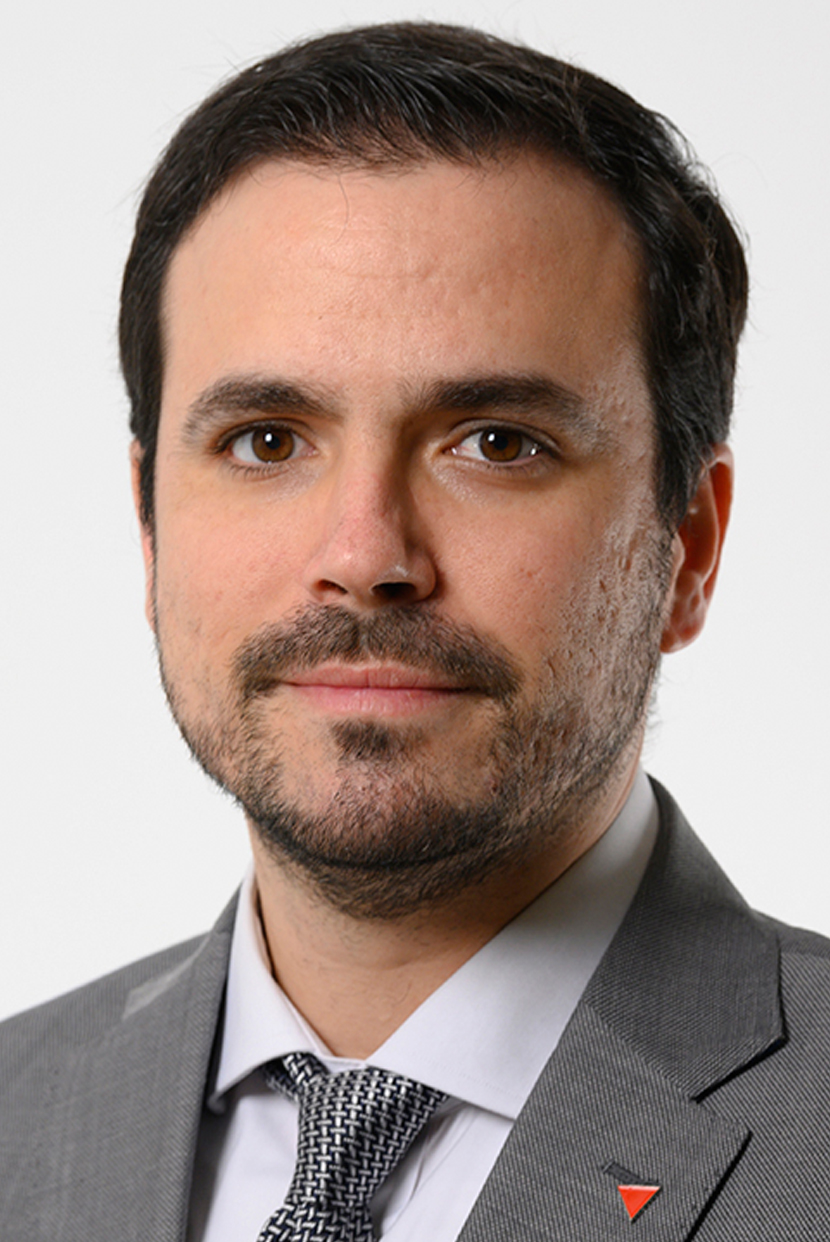
Alberto Garzón, (Note: Spain's Minister of Consumer Affairs) Communist Party of Spain (photo 2020)

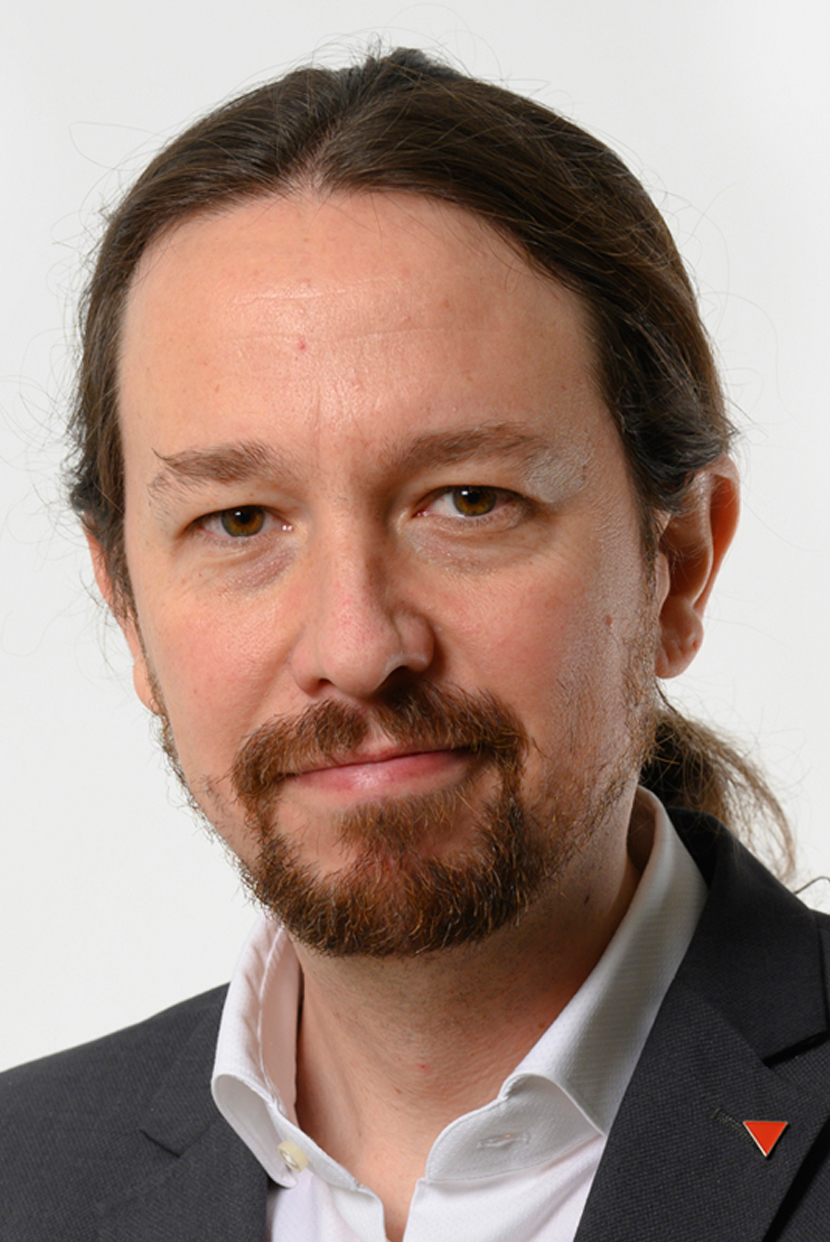
Pablo Iglesias Turrión, Podemos, Spain (photo 2020)

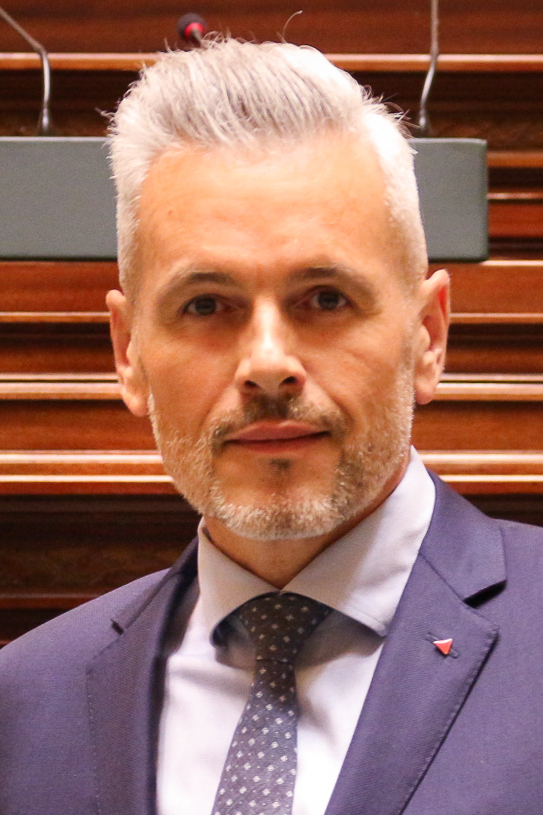
Christophe Lacroix, (Note: Representative for Liège in the Belgium's Chamber of Representatives, Socialist Party) Belgium (photo 2019)

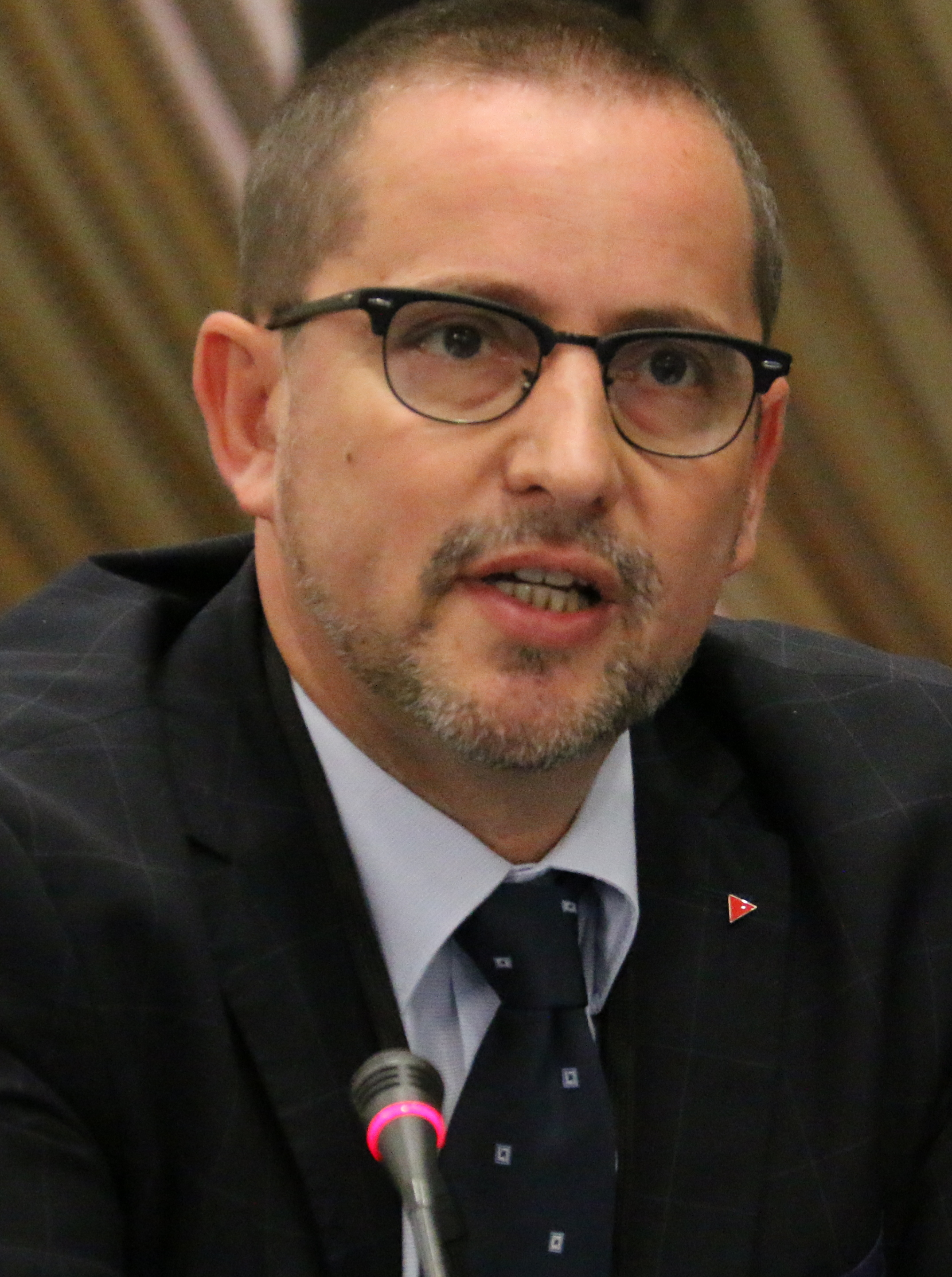
Stéphane Crusnière, Socialist Party, Belgium (photo 2016)

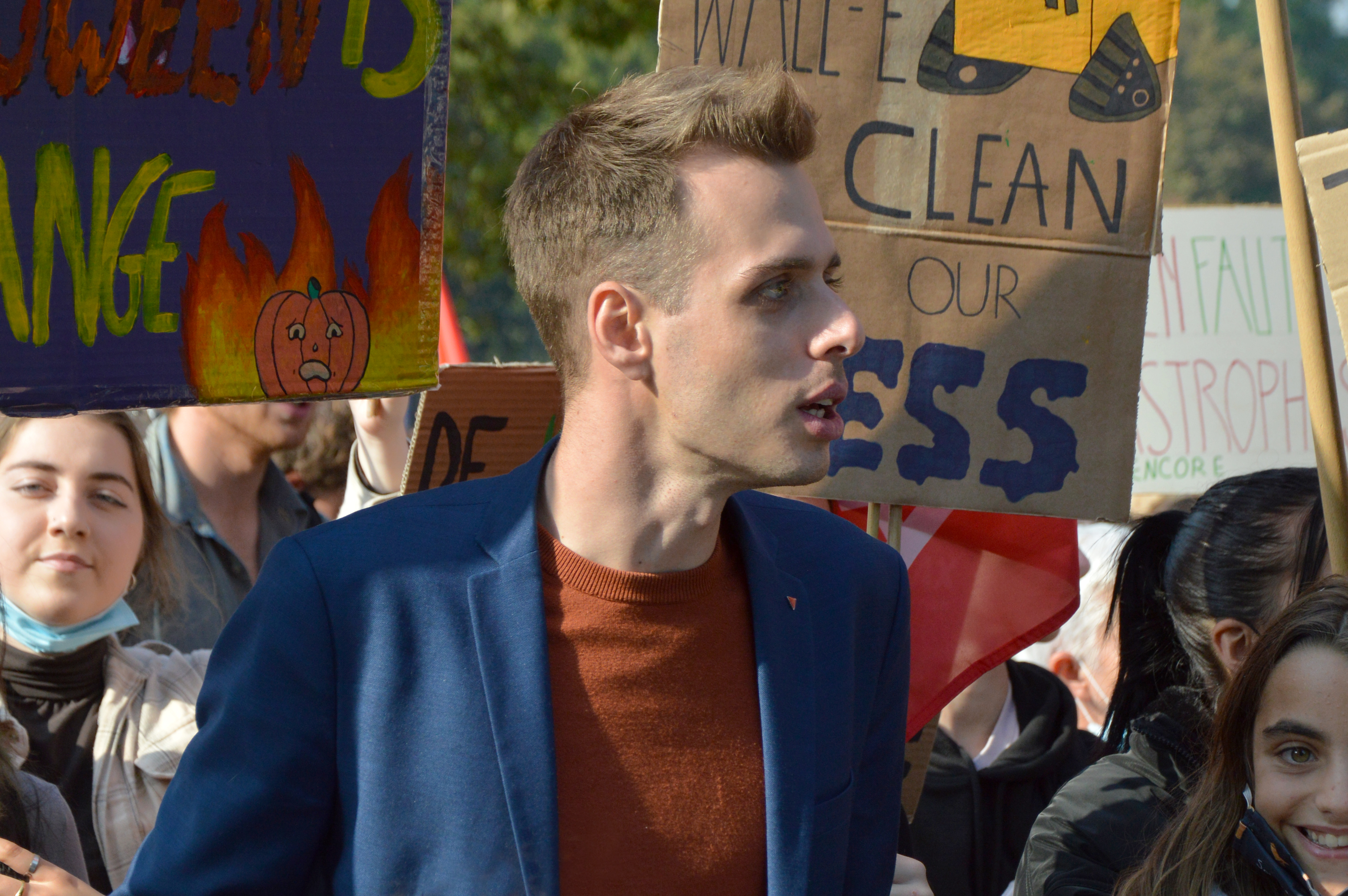
Jos D'Haese, Workers' Party of Belgium, (Note: WPB, PVDA-PTB) at the 2021 Back to the Climate march in Brussels

=== Symbols at protests and rallies ===
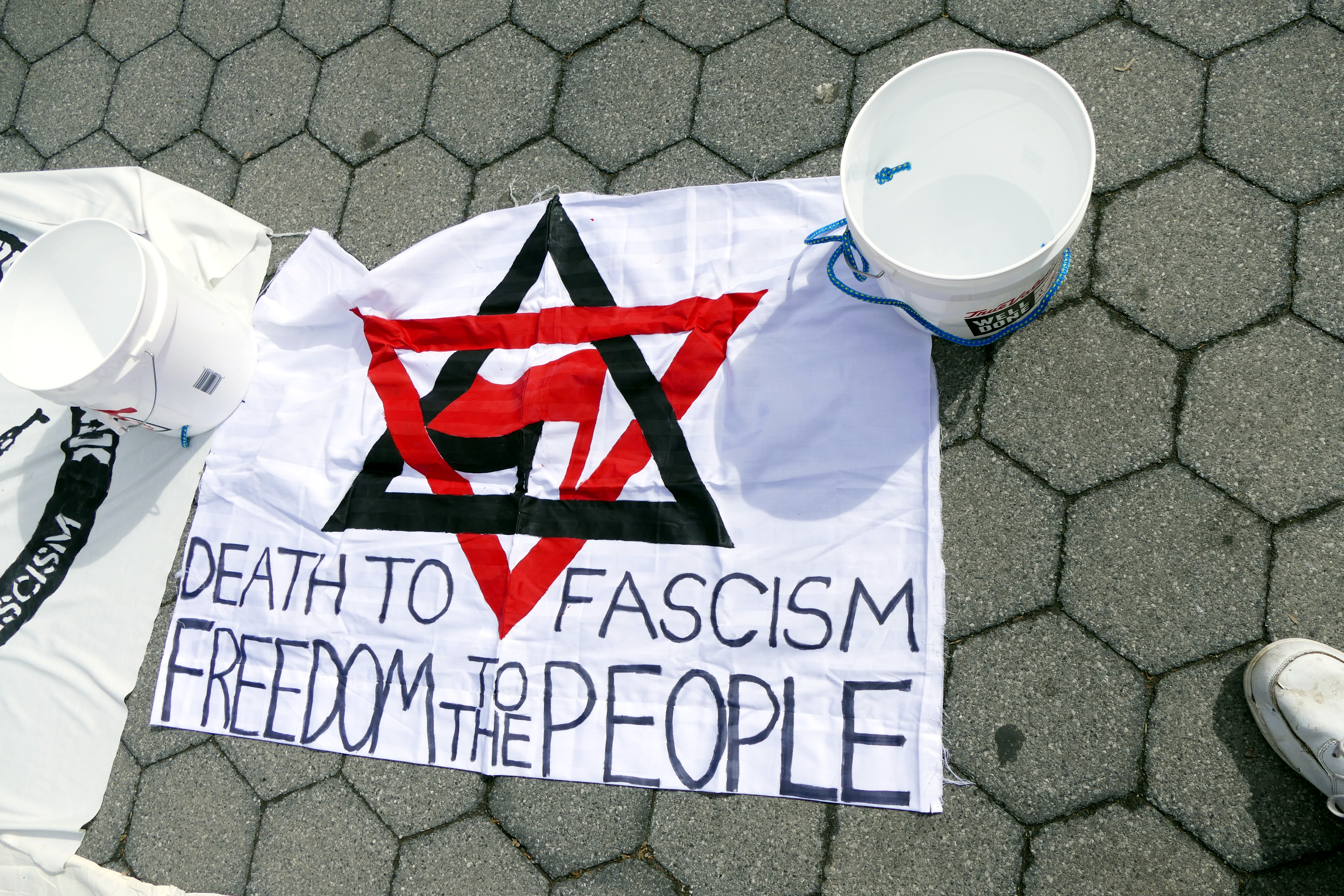
Variant anti-fascist symbol, based on the red and yellow badge of Jewish political prisoners, on a banner in New York in March 2019. (Note: after the Christchurch mosque massacre committed by an Australian Neonazi in New Zealand. At a rally against the Christchurch mosque massacre and other fascist violence. March Against Racism and Fascism in New York City on 16 March 2019. Similar symbols have been used elsewhere, such as by Jewish Anti Fascist Action in the UK and at protests elsewhere.)

Left: Modern anti-fascist symbol used in the USA. Right: "Come to us", 1932 poster from Antifaschistische Aktion, opponents of the original Nazi Party in Weimar Germany.

The yellow star, pink triangle, red triangle, and other symbols based on Nazi concentration camp badges have been used at protests and political rallies. Jewish variants of the anti-fascist symbol sometimes replicate the upside down tree triangle from the red and yellow badge used for Jewish political prisoners. (Note: Example: The website of "Jewdas", an anti-Zionist Jewish organisation, sold a variant anti-fascist symbol pin on a backing card based on a famous Ukrainian Jewish anti-Zionist poster.) The yellow star was depicted at rallies in Israel and New York against Donald Trump's ban on Muslim immigration. The red triangle was rarely used in this context except in Europe, this led to repeated confusion and in the 2020s. The red triangle was used ambiguously in Facebook ads for Donald Trump's 2020 presidential election campaign (see below). The red triangle allegedly got more common at protests in the United States during the Gaza war. This was frequently misinterpreted or misrepresented as a symbol of Nazi antisemitism. The Nazis used the symbol to mark political opponents in occupied Europe, not usually Jews, but sone argued the symbol was used in an antisemitic way if it was used to threaten non-Israeli Jews.

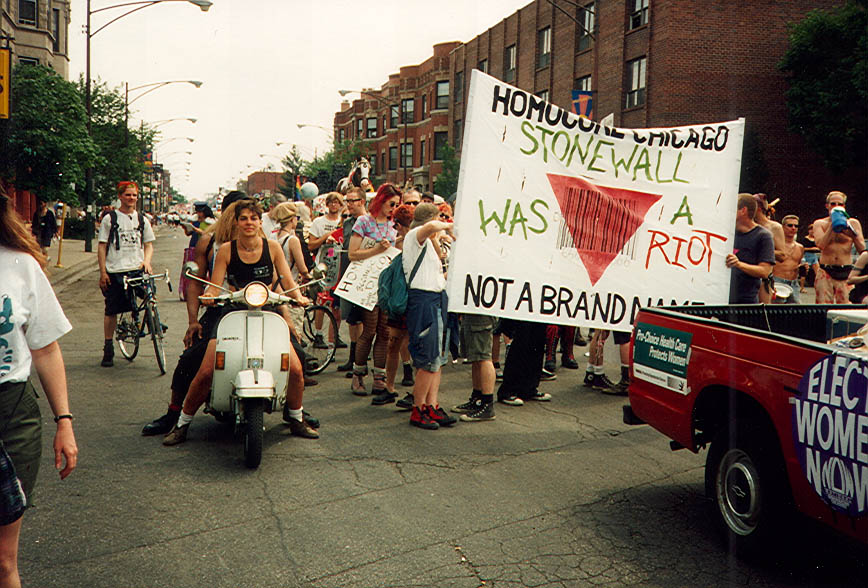
Pink triangle symbol at a queer pride parade on a banner about the Stonewall riots (1994)

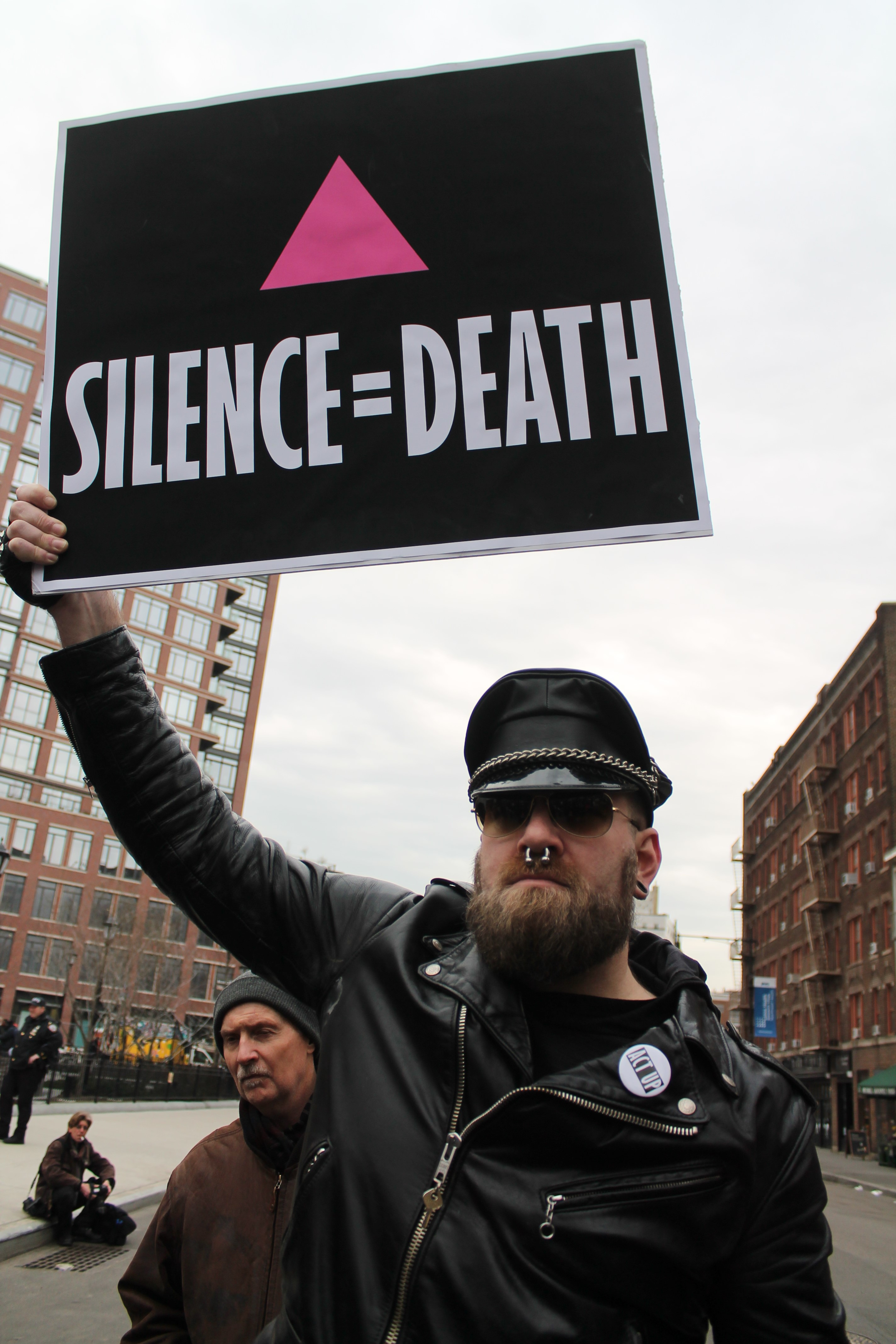
ACT UP sign with an upward-pointing pink triangle (2017)

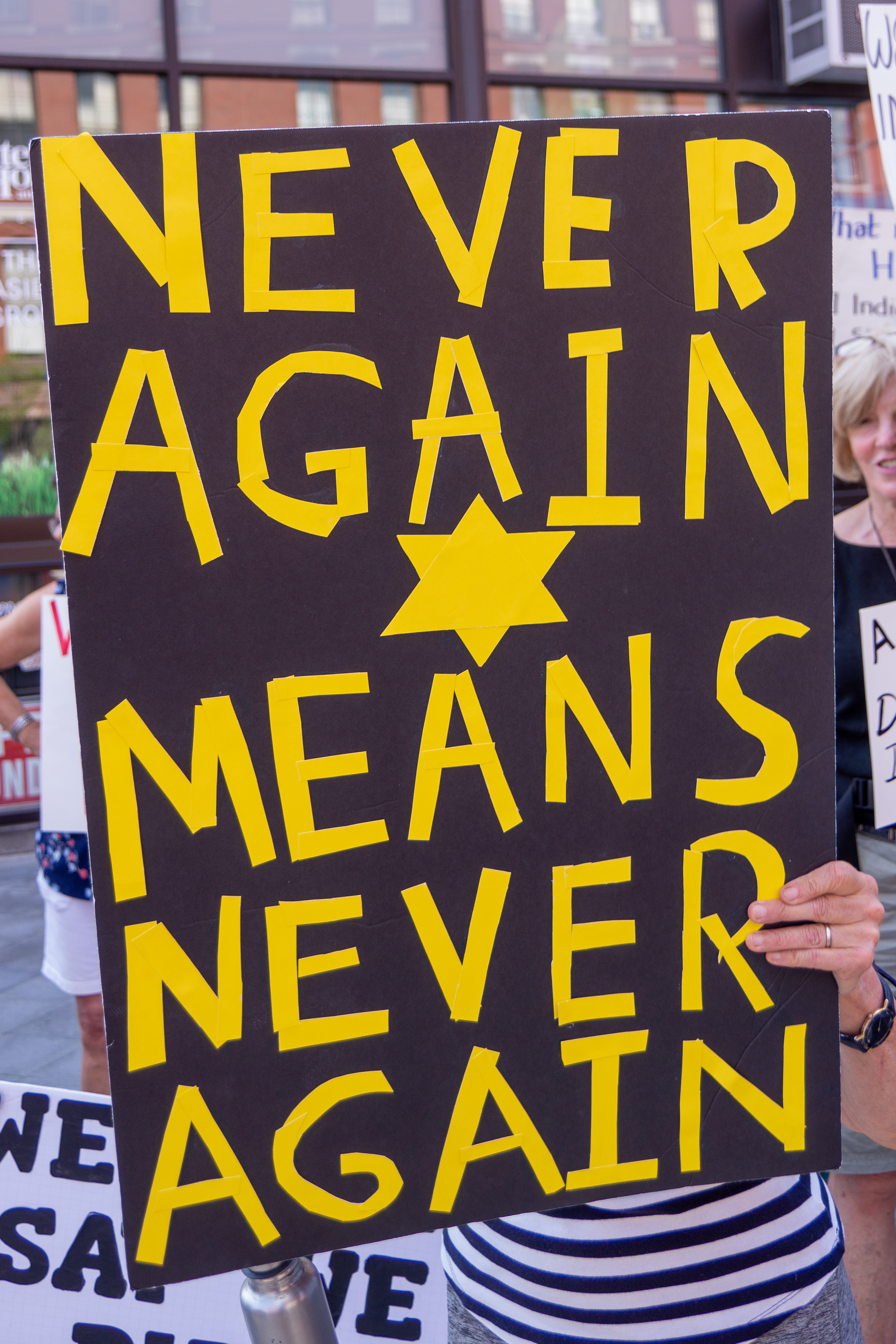
Yellow star and "Never Again Means Never Again" at a protest about immigration detention (2019)

==== Protests against Germany's AfD ====
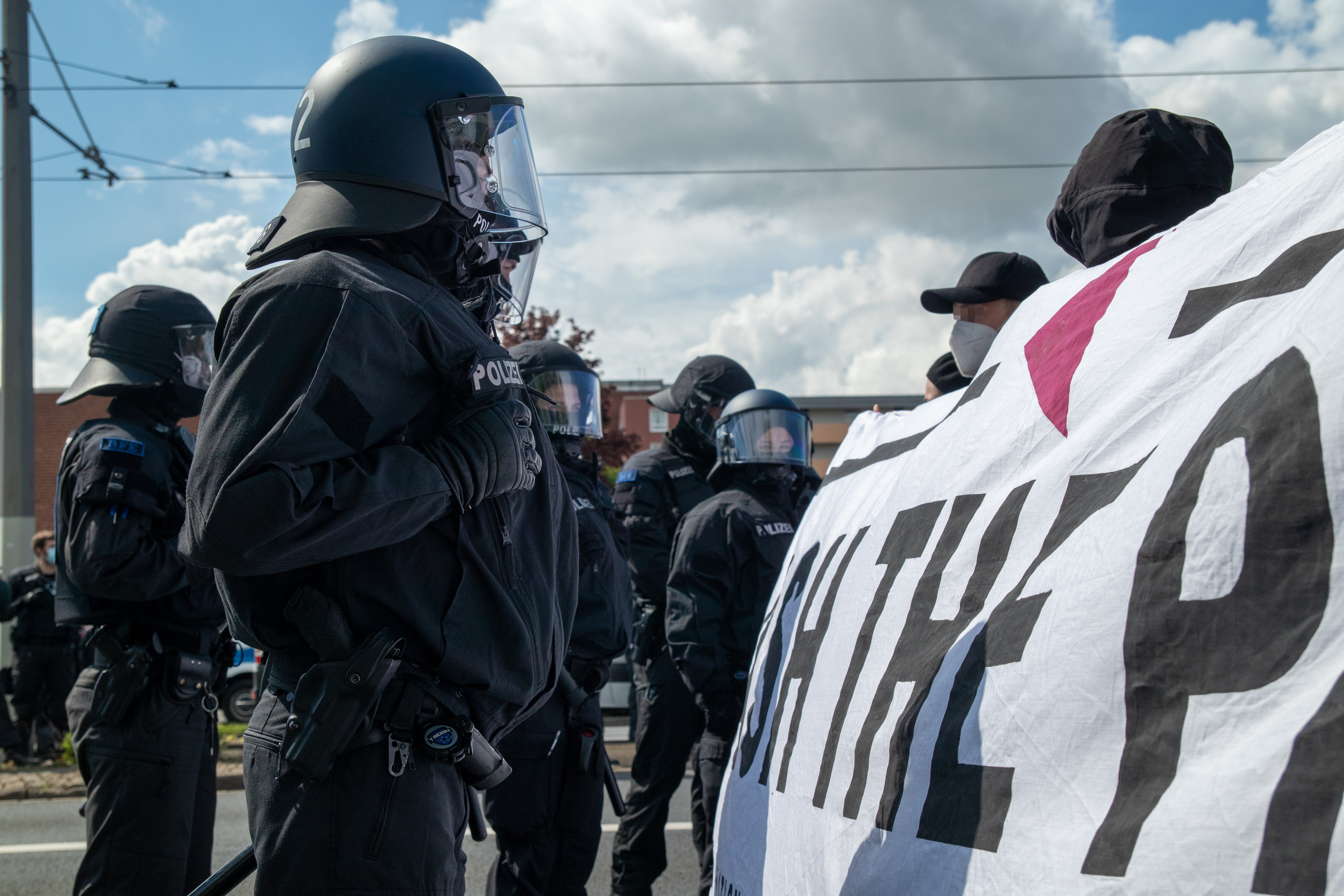
Protest against Alternative for Germany (AfD) in 2021. (Note: Image from a protest in Braunschweig, Lower Saxony in 2021. The banner says "crash the party" (in English) with Nationalismus ist keine Alternative (NIKA, English: Nationalism is not an alternative) underneath, and had been used at earlier protests as well.)

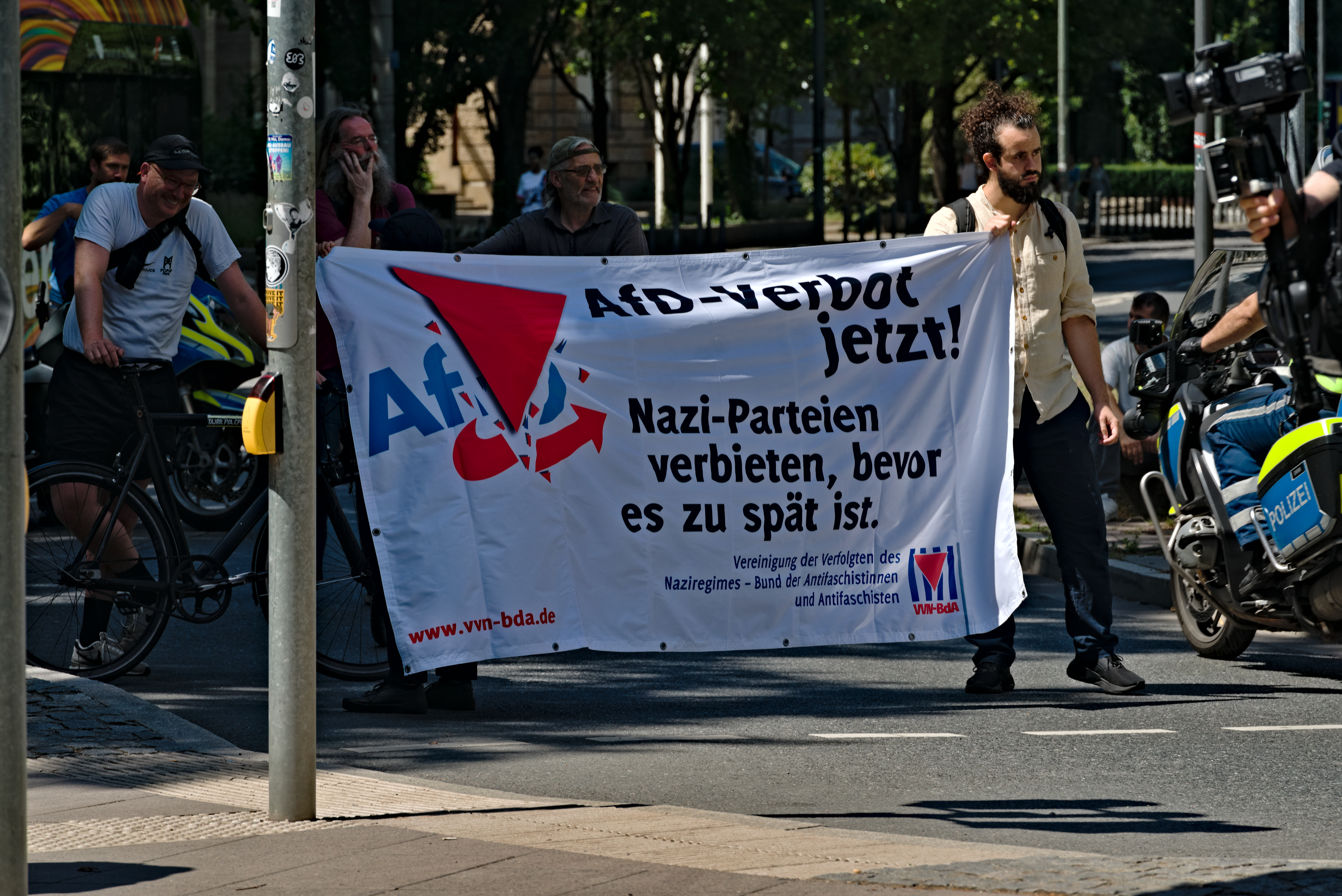
VVN-BdA banner at a protest against Alternative for Germany (AfD) in 2025. (Note: Translation: "Ban the AfD now! Ban Nazi parties, before it's too late".)

=== United States president Donald Trump ===
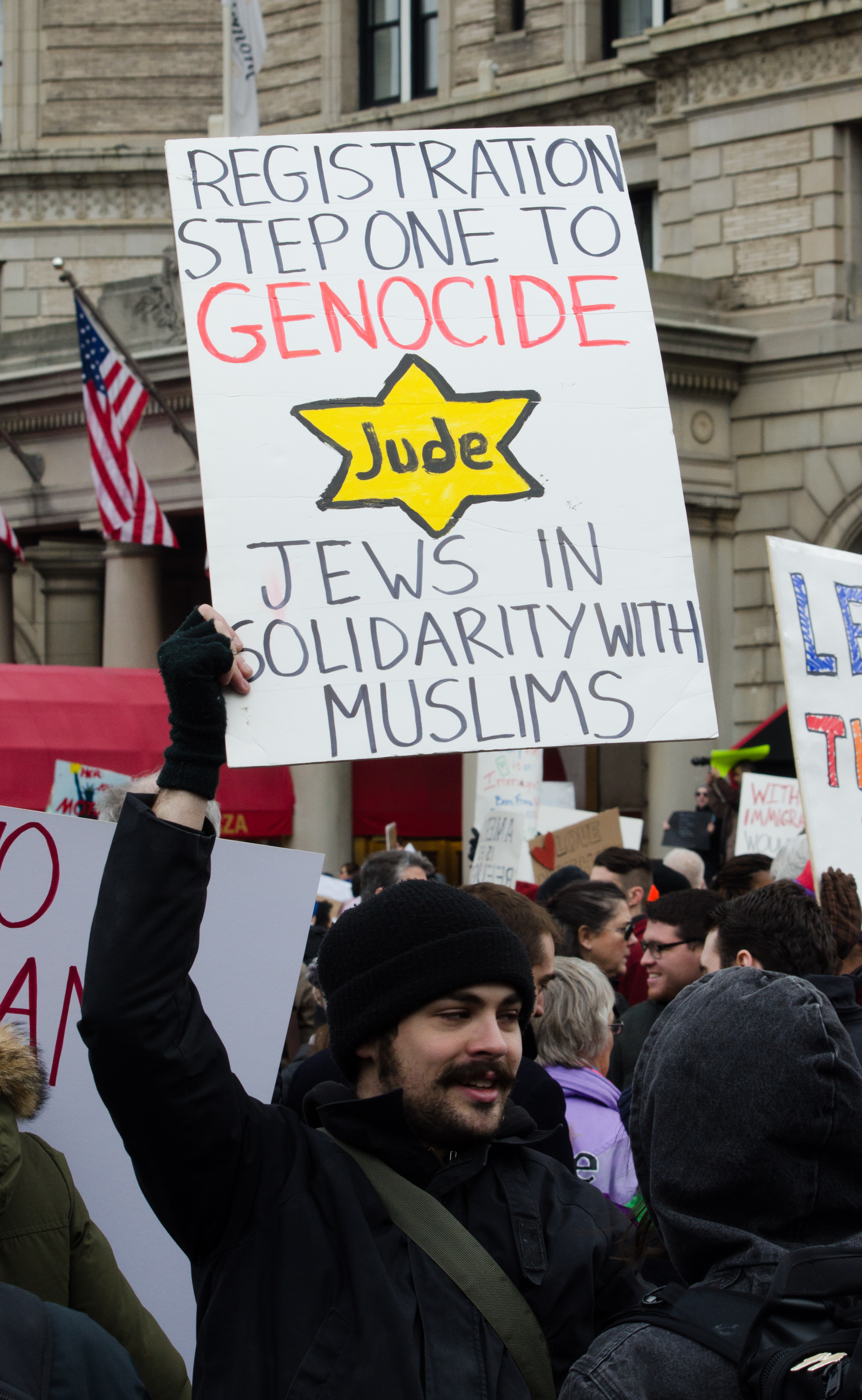
Yellow star at a protest against Islamophobia in the USA (2017)

Donald Trump's inauguration coincided with the arrival of the AfD in Bundestag. Many independent protesters also used yellow stars and pink triangles. One controversial campaign against him in 2017 used multi coloured inverted triangle badges replicating the prisoner designations from Nazi Germany.

In April 2017 Trump "vowed" to "combat antisemitism".

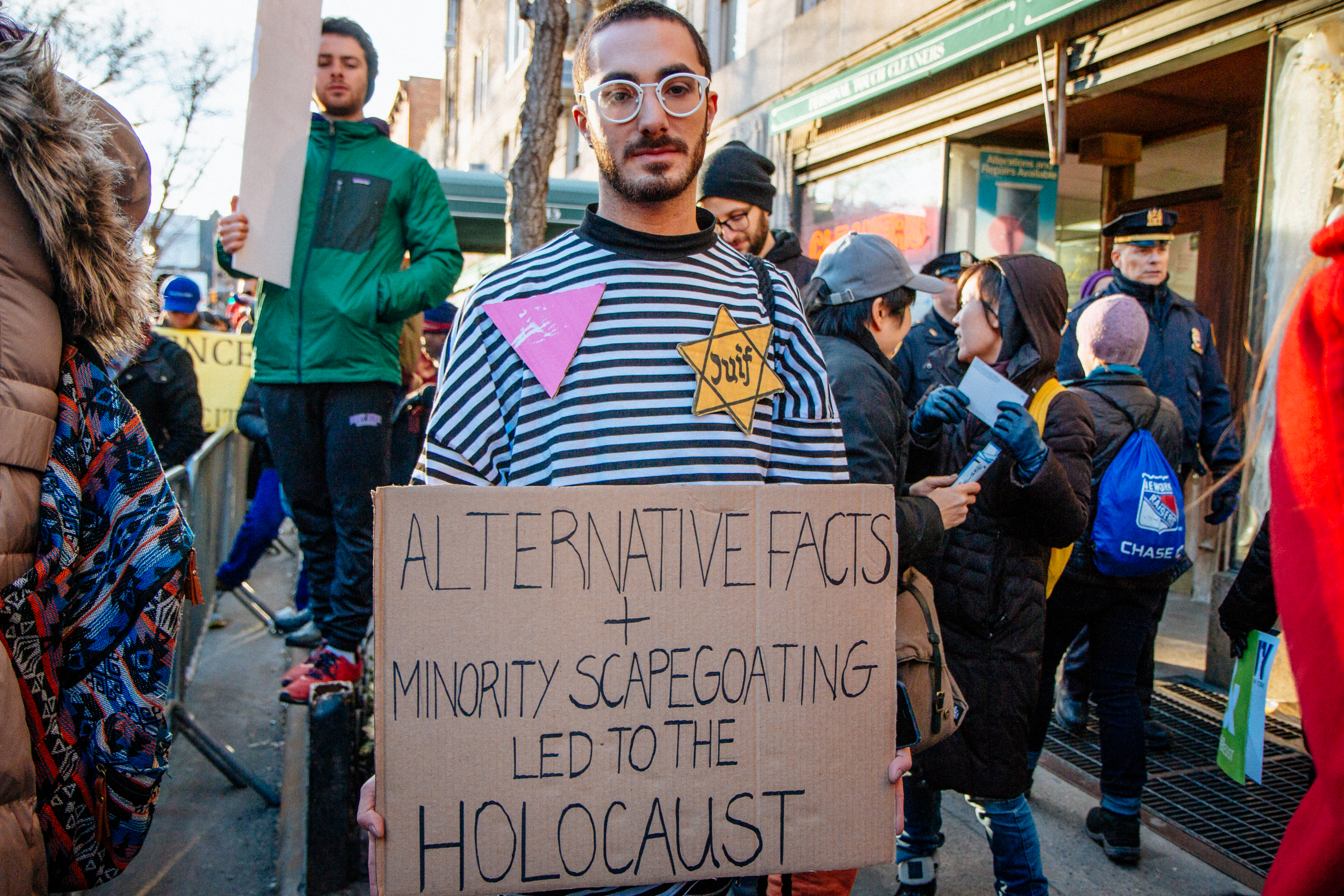
Protest against Trump in February 2017 in front of the Stonewall Inn

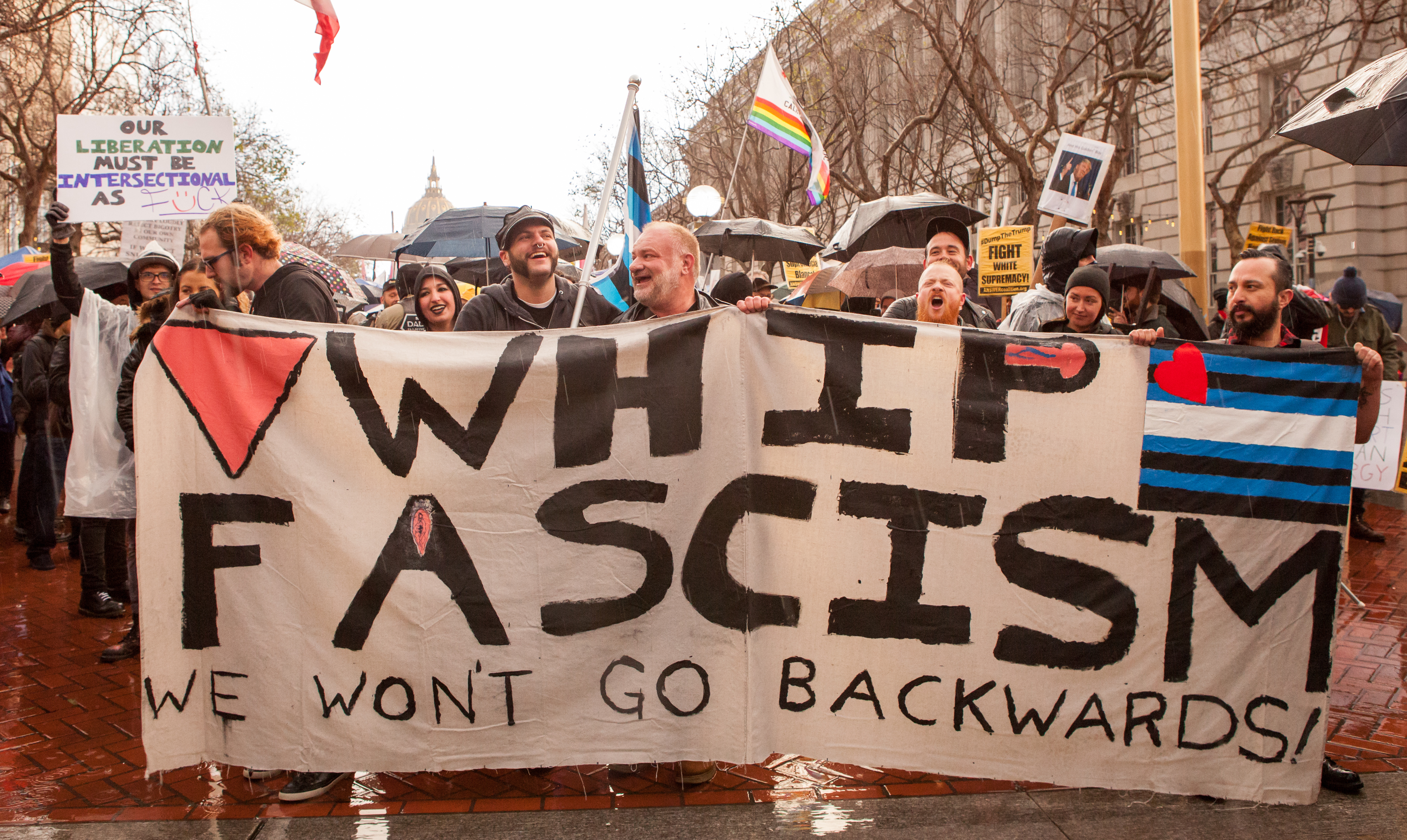
Pink triangle on a protest banner calling Trump a fascist, in San Francisco in 2017

==== 2020 Trump campaign ====
In June 2020, the re-election campaign of Donald Trump posted an advertisement on Facebook stating that "Dangerous MOBS of far-left groups are running through our streets and causing absolute mayhem" and identifying them as "ANTIFA", accompanied by a graphic of a downward-pointing red triangle. The ads appeared on the Facebook pages of Donald Trump, the Trump campaign, and Vice President Mike Pence. Many observers compared the graphic to the symbol used by the Nazis for identifying political prisoners such as communists, social democrats and socialists. Many noted the number of ads – 88 – which is associated with neo-Nazis and white supremacists.

As an example of the public outcry against the use of the downward-pointing red triangle, as reported by MotherJones, the Twitter account (@jewishaction), the account of Bend the Arc: Jewish Action, a Progressive Jewish site stated:

"The President of the United States is campaigning for reelection using a Nazi concentration camp symbol. Nazis used the red triangle to mark political prisoners and people who rescued Jews. Trump & the RNC are using it to smear millions of protestors.

Their masks are off. pic.twitter.com/UzmzDaRBup"

Facebook removed the campaign ads with the graphic, saying that its use in this context violated their policy against "organised hate". The Trump campaign's communications director wrote, "The red triangle is a common Antifa symbol used in an ad about Antifa." Historian Mark Bray, author of Antifa: The Anti-Fascist Handbook, disputed this, saying that the symbol is not associated with Antifa in the United States.

=== Controversial uses of yellow stars ===
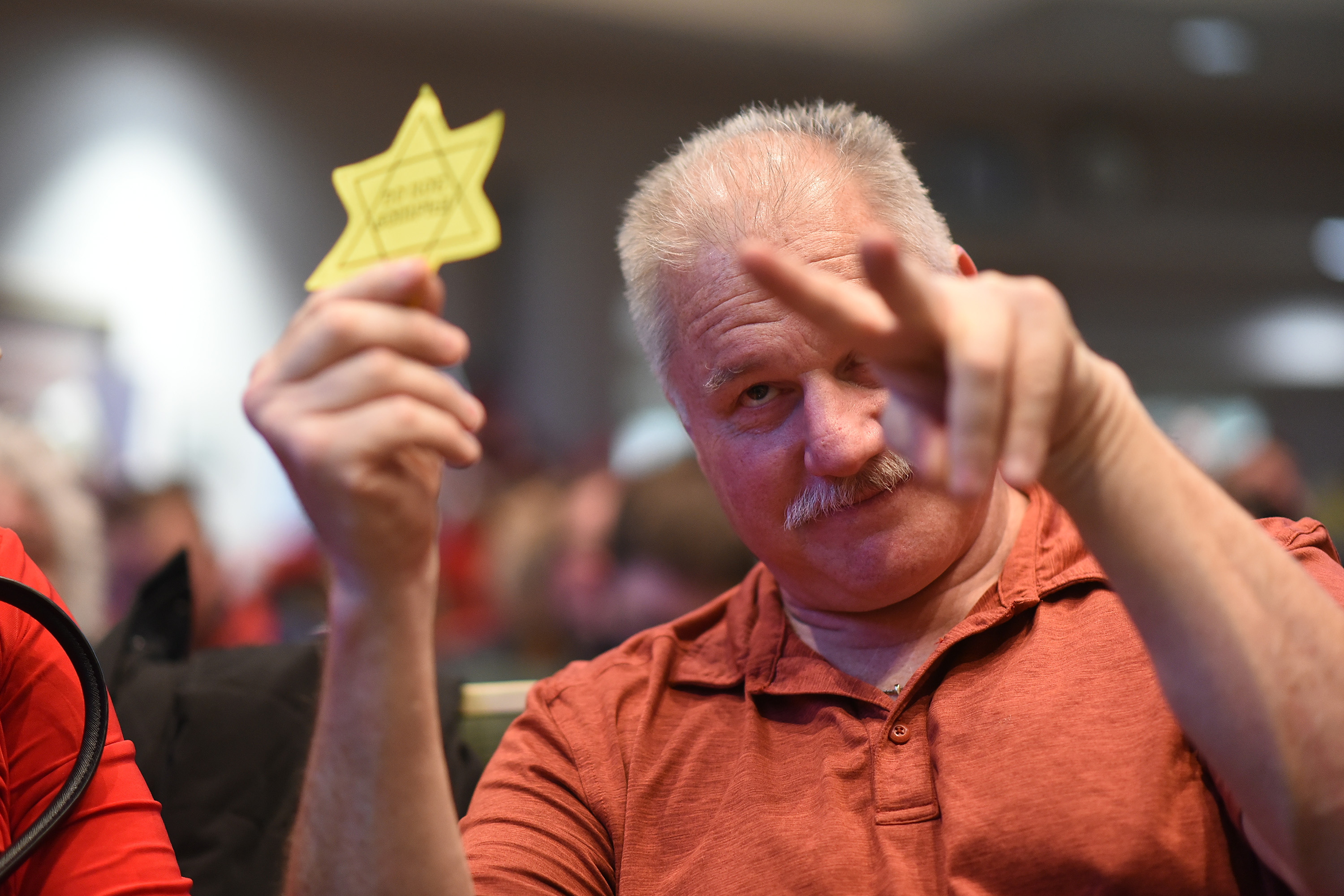
A member of the audience taunts Assembly Member Forrest Dunbar, who is Jewish, with a yellow Star of David at the September 29, 2021 Anchorage Assembly meeting about a proposed mask mandate.

During the COVID-19 pandemic, many anti-vaccine and anti-lockdown protesters appropriated the Jewish yellow star from ghettos and concentration camps.

=== Gaza war protests and military media ===
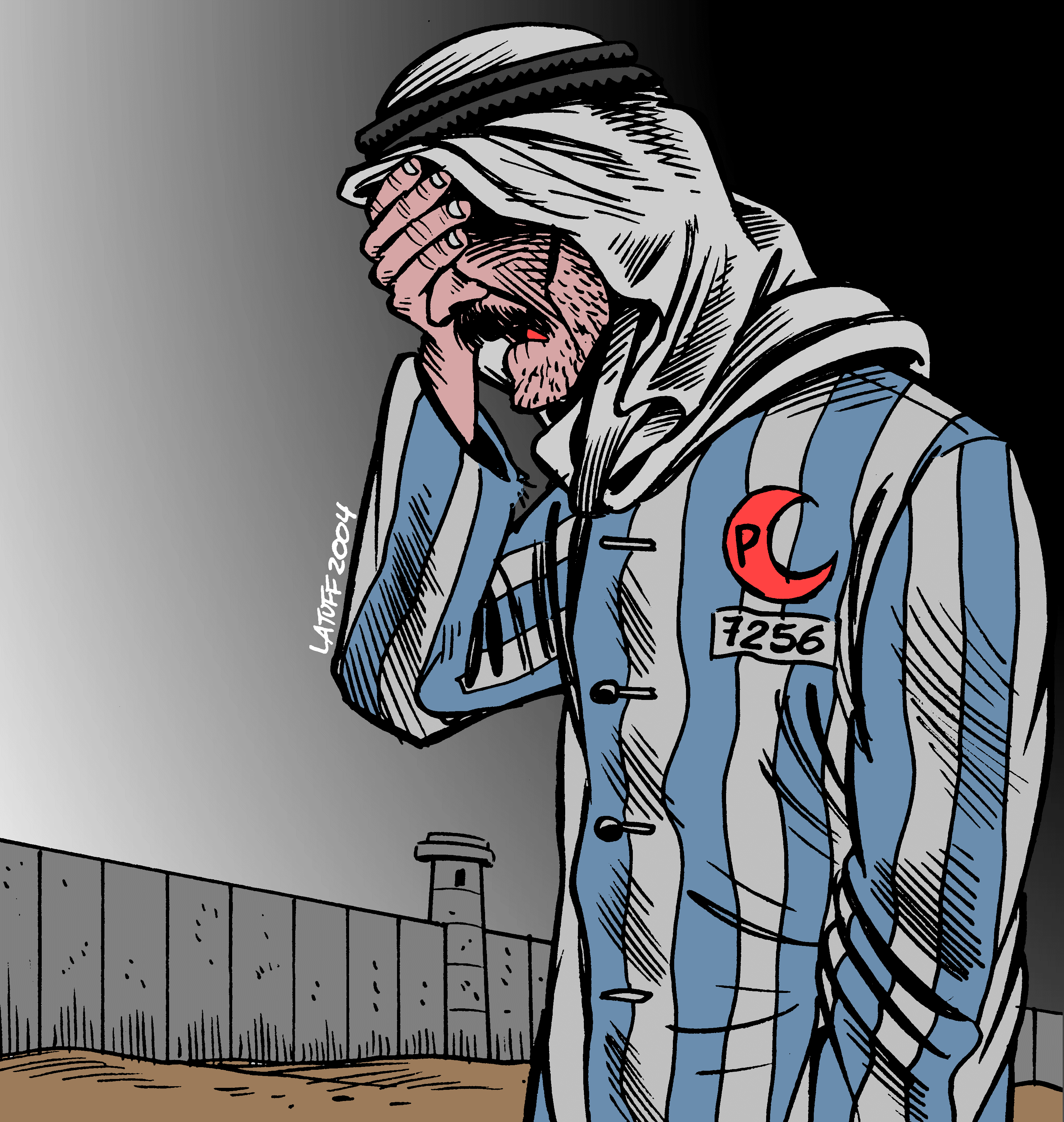
Political cartoon by Carlos Latuff

==== Before 2023 ====
There had been prior uses of concentration camp symbols before the war. Symbols based on the reappropriation of the Nazi red triangle occasionally appeared in artworks and protests about Palestine before 2023 (see above).

A political cartoon by Brazilian artist Carlos Latuff depicted a Palestinian man behind the West Bank barrier in the striped uniform of a Nazi concentration camp, with a red crescent in place of the red inverted triangle worn by political prisoners, or red and yellow star worn by Jewish political prisoners. In 2006 a Latuff's cartoon won second prize in the 2006 International Holocaust Cartoon Competition in Iran. The competition in Iran was started as retaliation for Western cartoonists' depictions of the Islamic prophet Muhammed and associated claims of "free speech", by choosing the topic Western audiences would find most offensive.

==== Yellow stars during the Gaza war ====
In late December 2023, Gilad Erdan, Israel's ambassador to the United Nations, provoked controversy by wearing a yellow star at the assembly. Erdan claimed that the October 7 Attacks was equivalent to Germany's genocide of Jews during The Holocaust in Nazi Germany and German-occupied Europe. The analogy was controversial. The Vad Yashem Holocaust Memorial chairperson Dani Dayan said, "This act belittles the victims of the Holocaust as well as the state of Israel,.. The yellow star symbolizes the helplessness of the Jewish people and their being at the mercy of others... We now have an independent state and a strong army. We are the masters of our own fate".

==== Red triangles during the Gaza war ====
In the first two weeks of the Gaza war European leftists, such as United Left in Spain, began using their own red triangle symbols on flyers promoting protests and other activism. Spain's United Left combined their red triangle symbol with the Palestinian flag on promotions for a protest that was held on 21 October 2023.

Before the Gaza war, right-wing Western European sources have claimed that the red triangle has anti-Jewish connotations for focusing on the non-Jewish victims of the Holocaust.

Some sources have suggested that the inverted red triangle symbol used by Hamas in its propaganda videos is reminiscent of the same red triangle used by the Nazis, with regards to antisemitism during the Gaza war. However, the Nazis used the inverted red triangle to identify prisoners with political views opposed to Nazism, not necessarily Jewish prisoners. The red inverted triangle was first used in the 1930s to mark German communists and Social Democrats, then during WWII the inverted red triangle was used to mark people who resisted the Nazi occupation of their countries by Nazi Germany. However, news media suggested the symbol used in Palestinian propaganda independently originated from the red section on the Palestinian flag.

=== Images of memorials and other post-war use ===
Some examples of camp triangle emblems on monuments and related uses

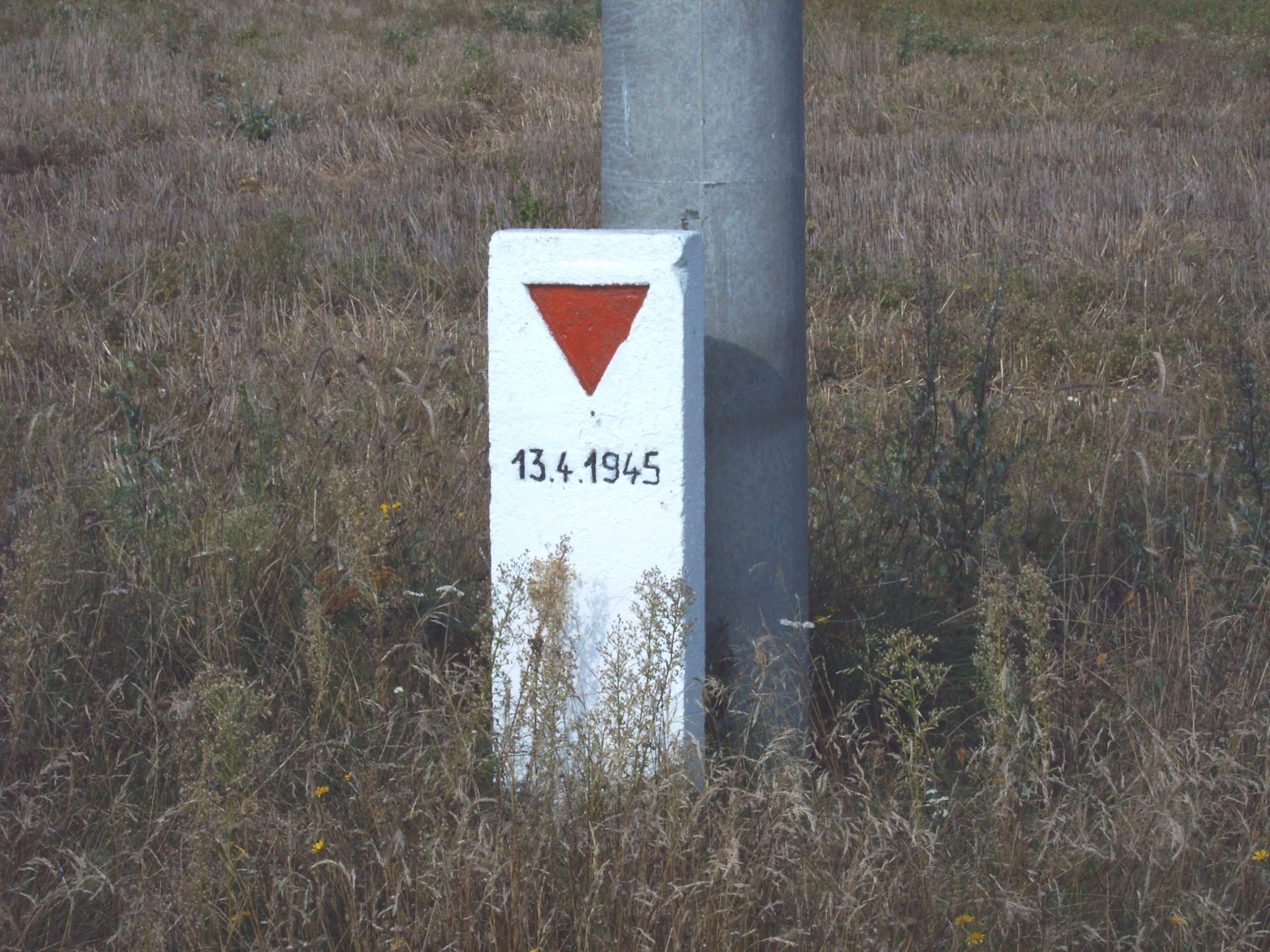
A Dora Todesmarsch (death march) roadside tablet marked only with the date and a red triangle

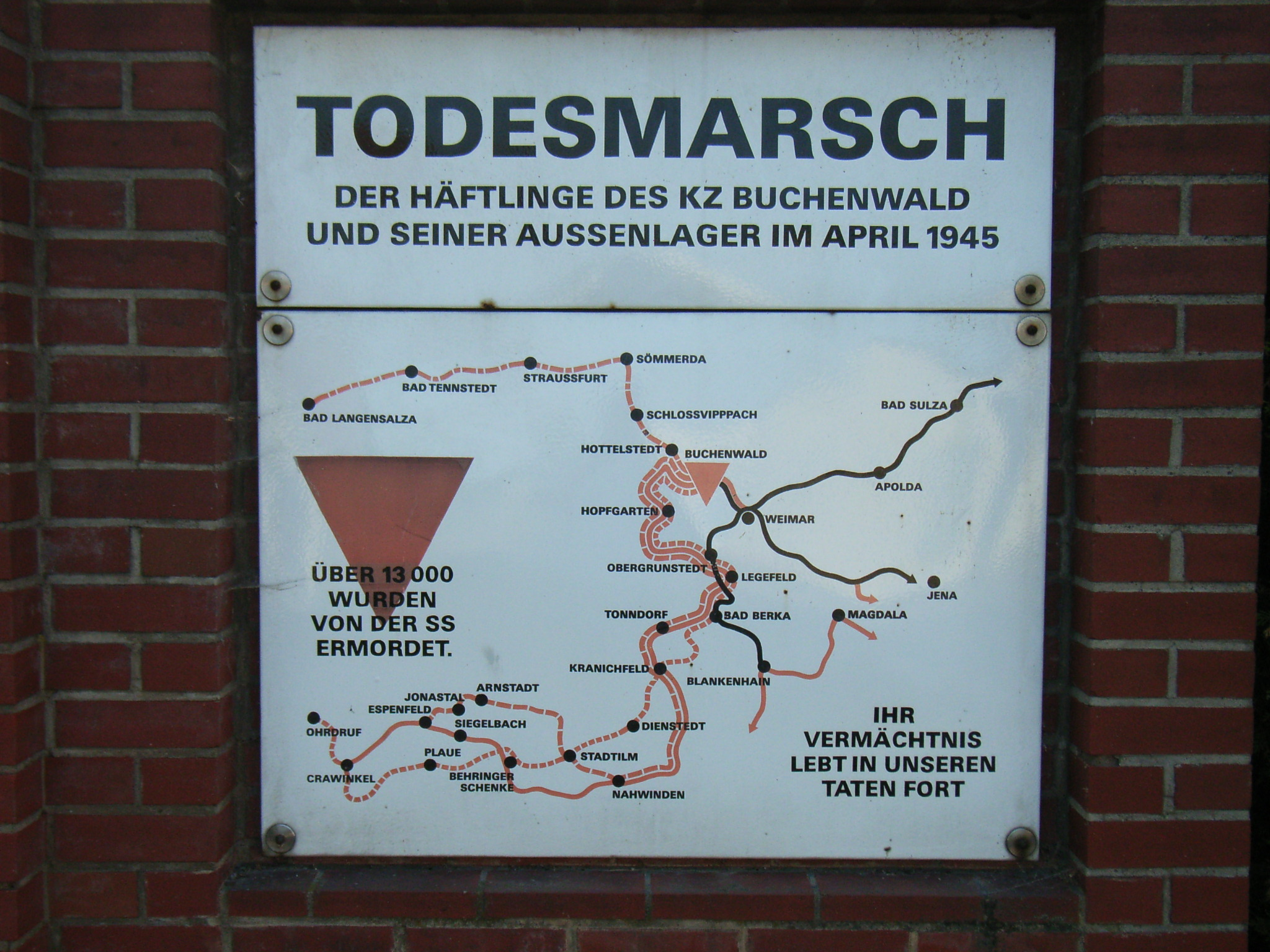
On a Buchenwald Todesmarsch (death march) route historical marker

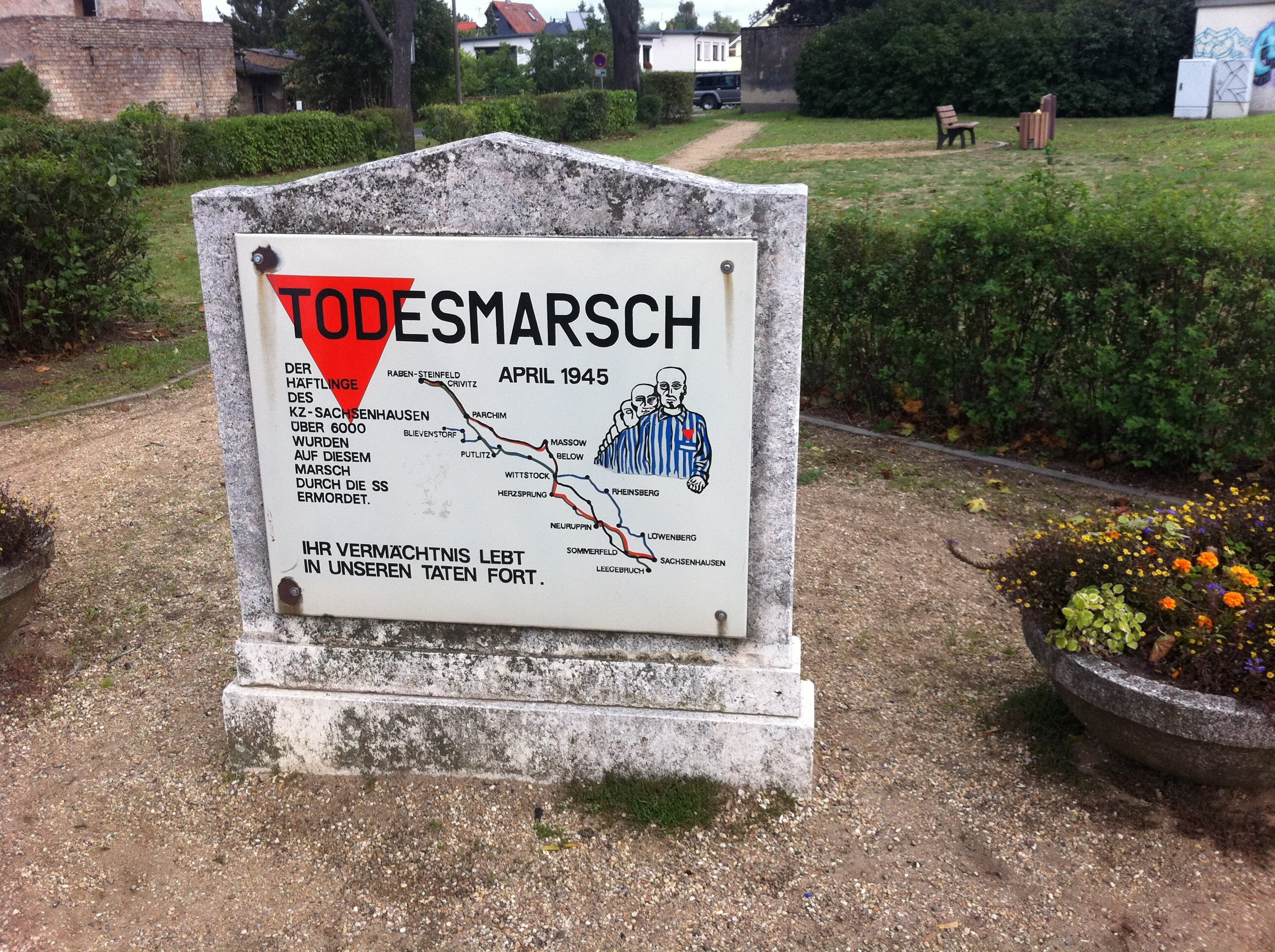
On a Sachsenhausen death march route historical marker

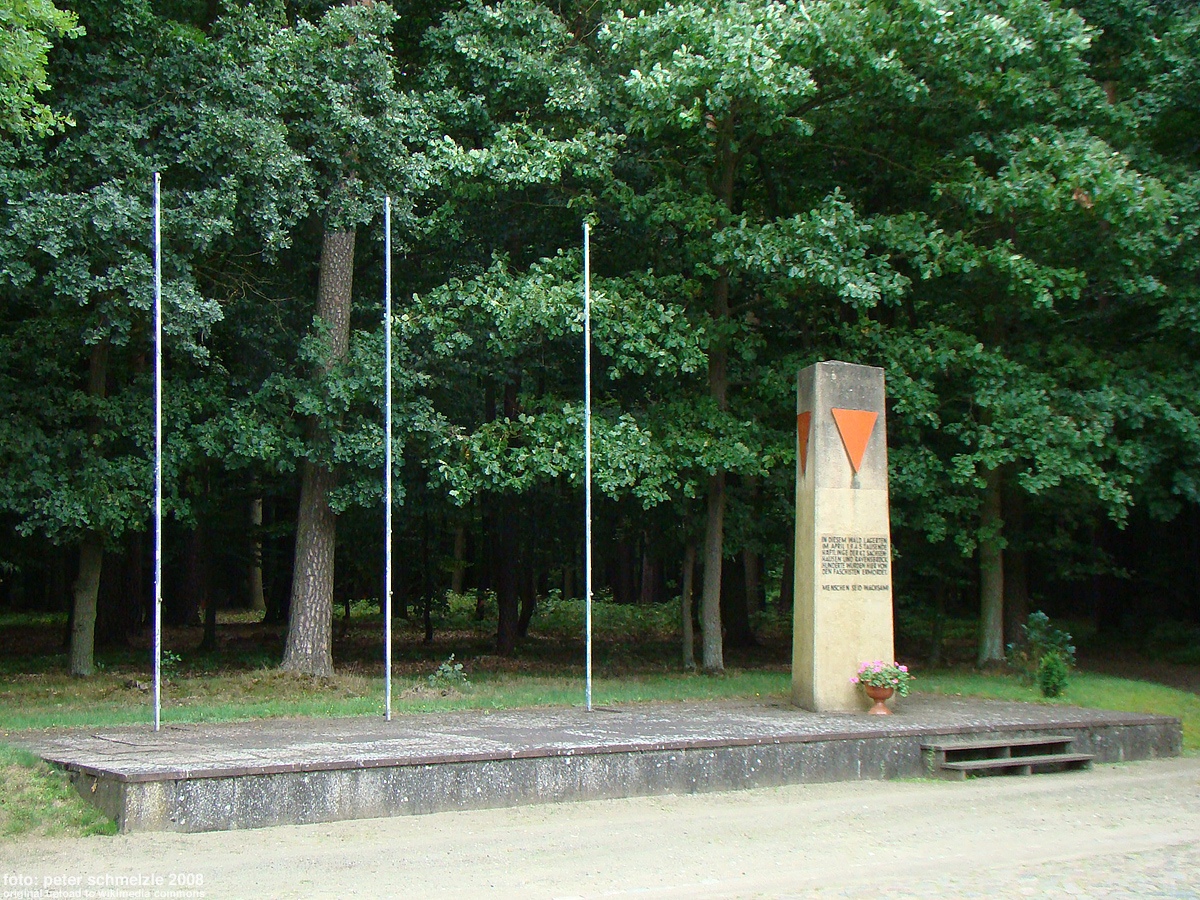
Monument (in the village of Grabow-Below) for Ravensbrück death march victims

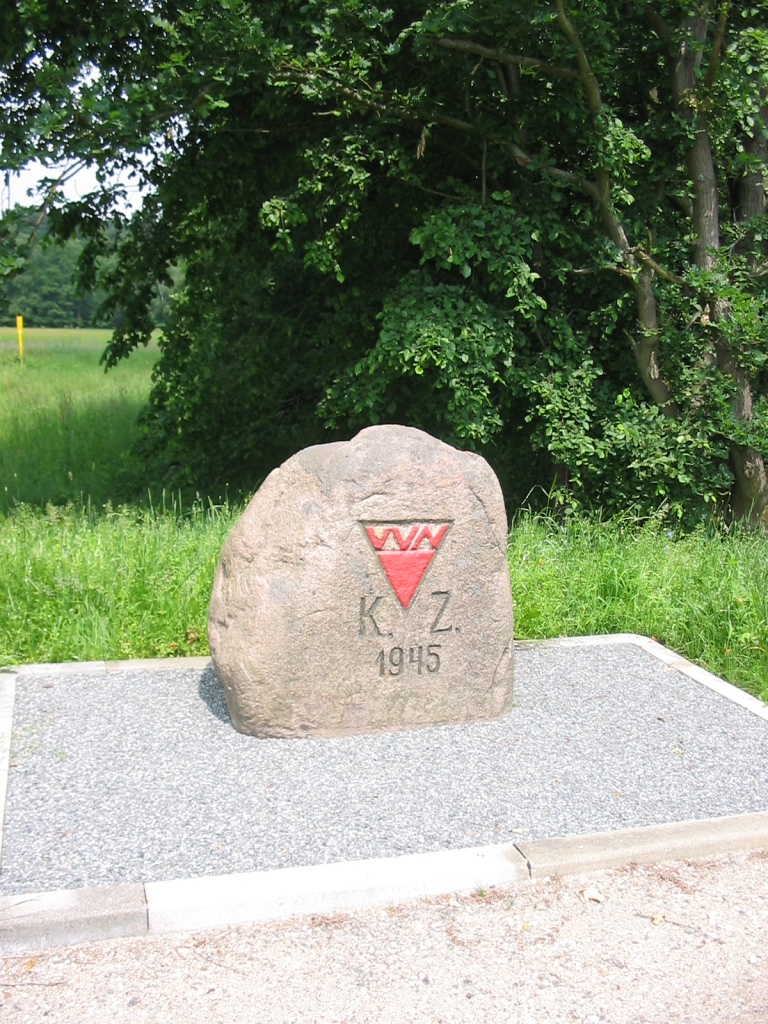
On a Wöbbelin memorial stone

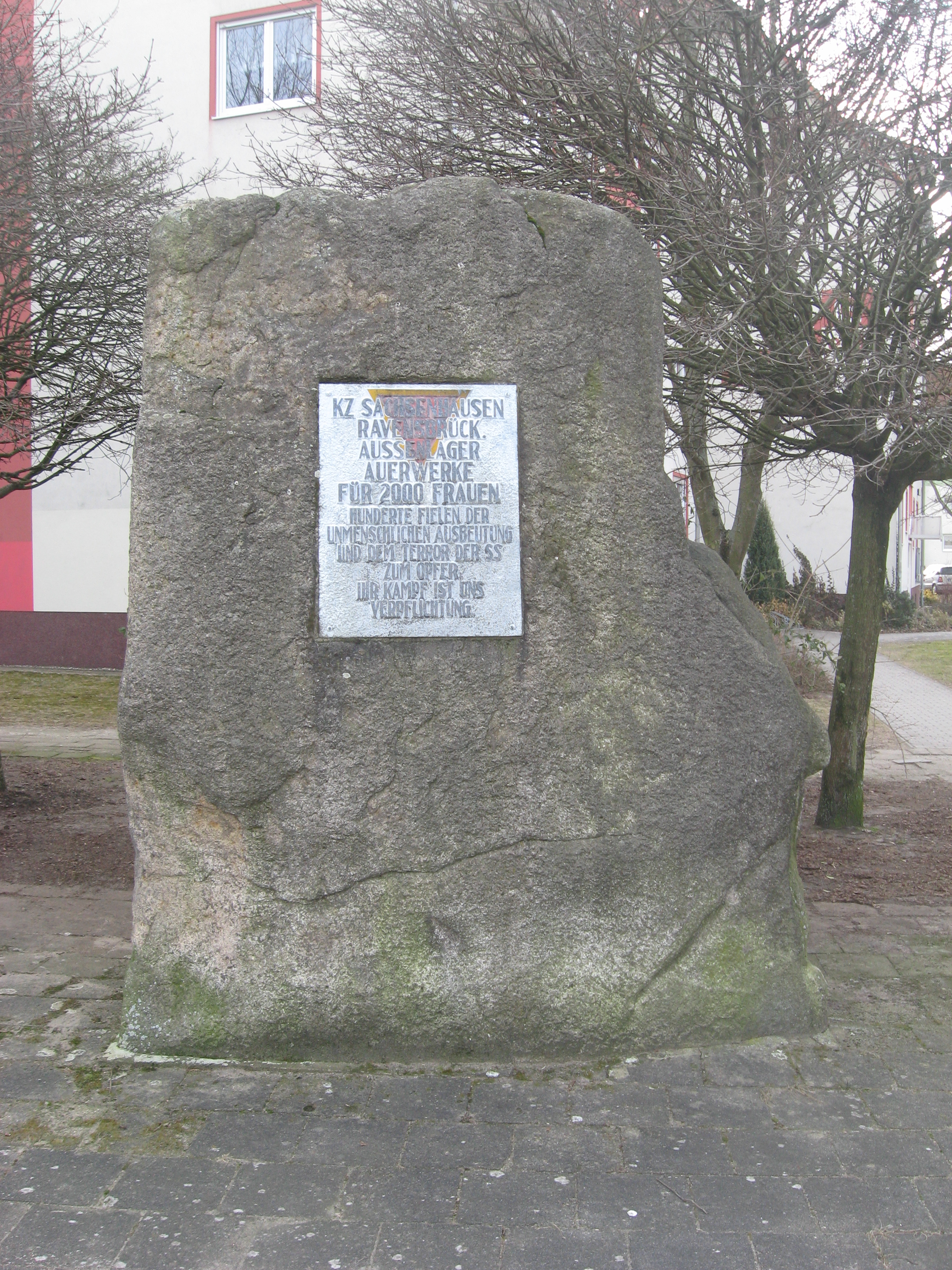
Boulder (in Lindenring) for 2,000 women victims of Ravensbrück

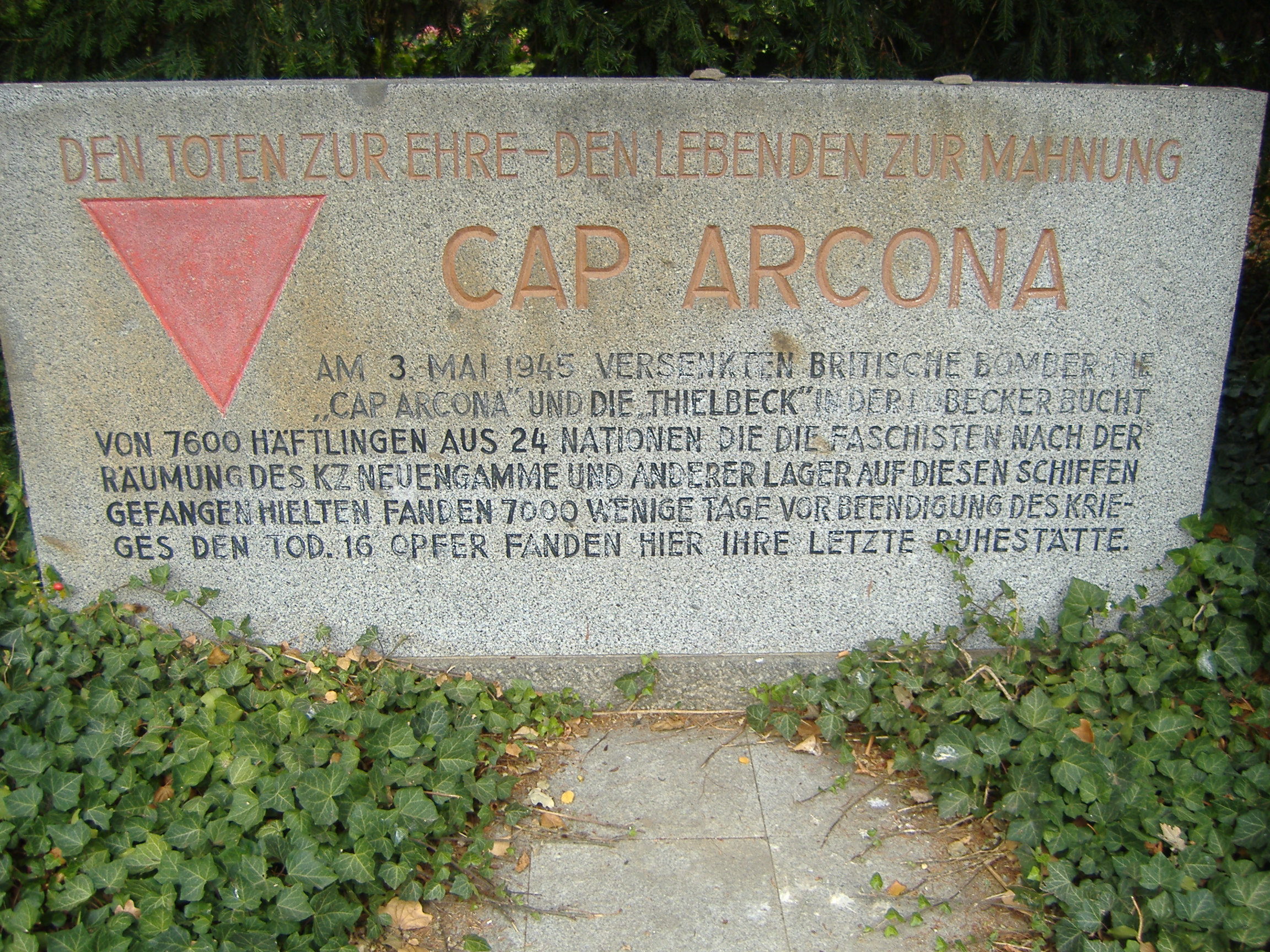
On a Cap Arcona incident memorial

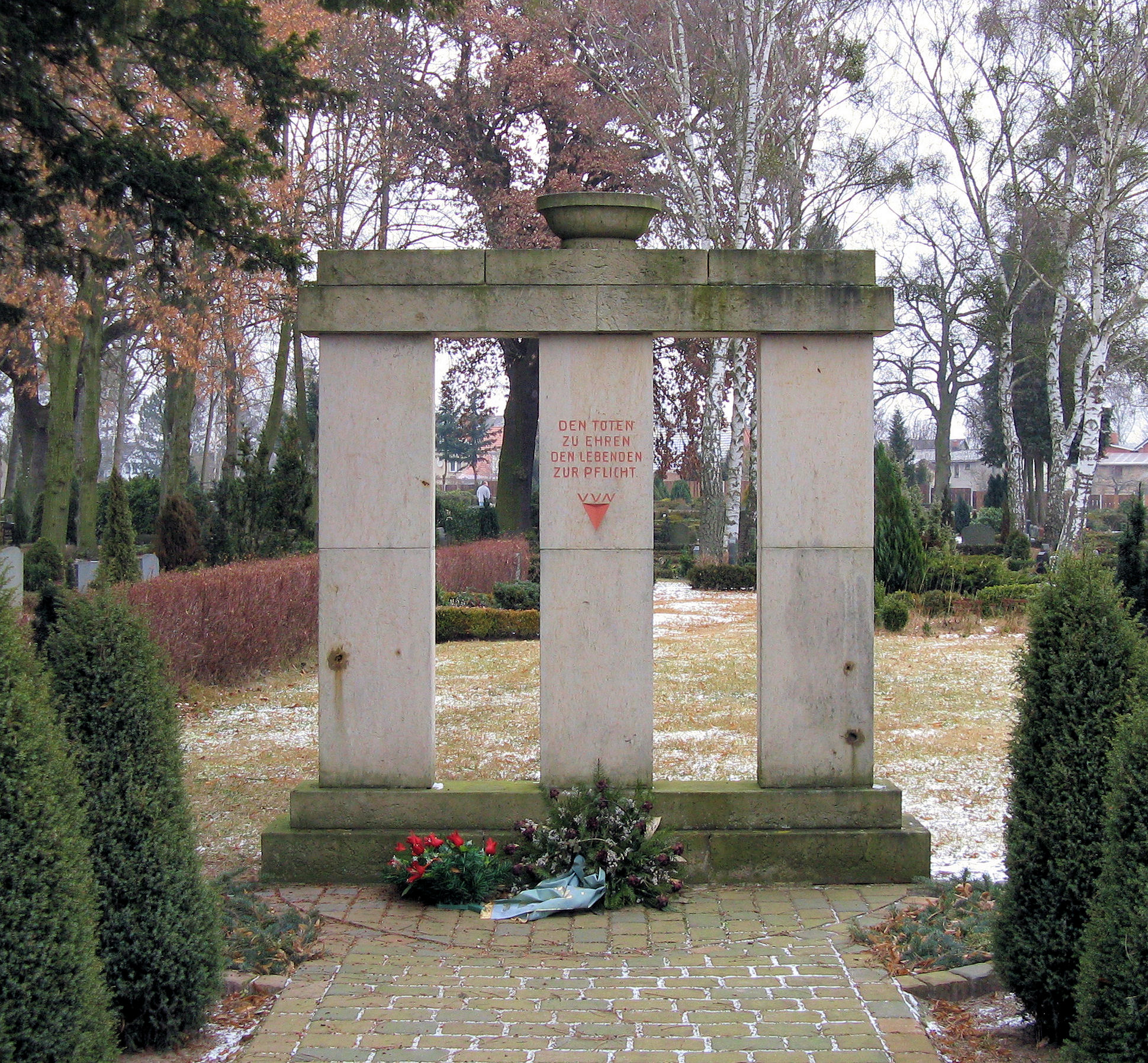
At the Neustadt-Glewe concentration camp memorial

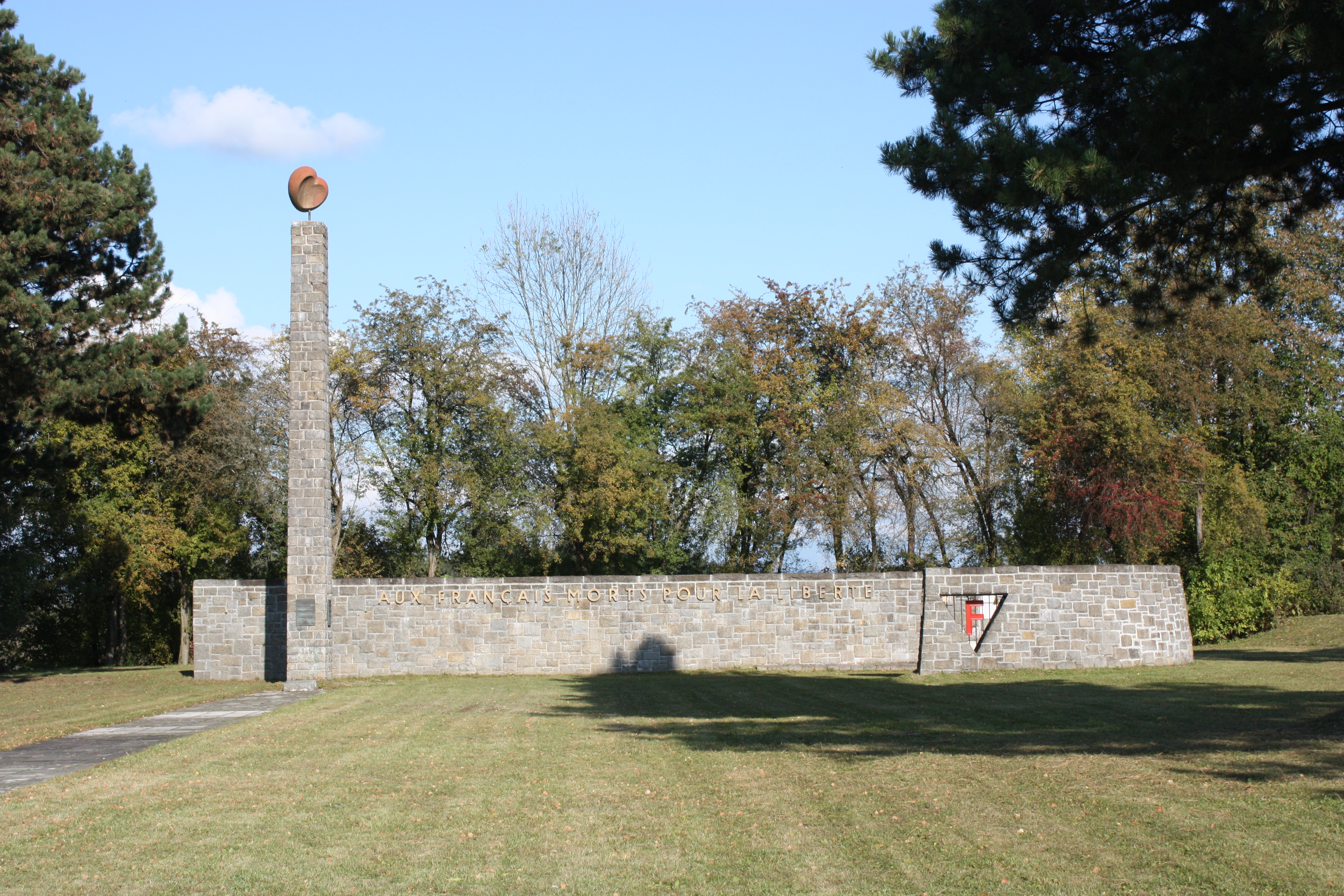
F-triangle at Mauthausen-Gusen honors French victims

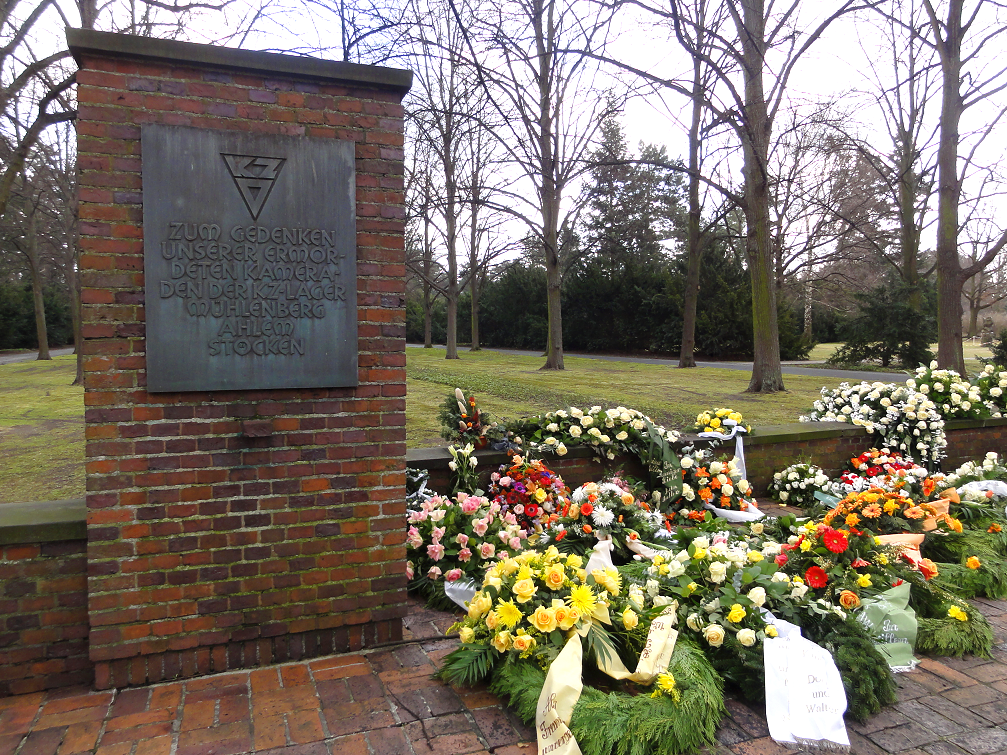
On a monument to Neuengamme victims in Hamburg (Note: the letters KZ are not nationality-letters, but rather are the German abbreviation for Konzentrationslager (concentration camp))

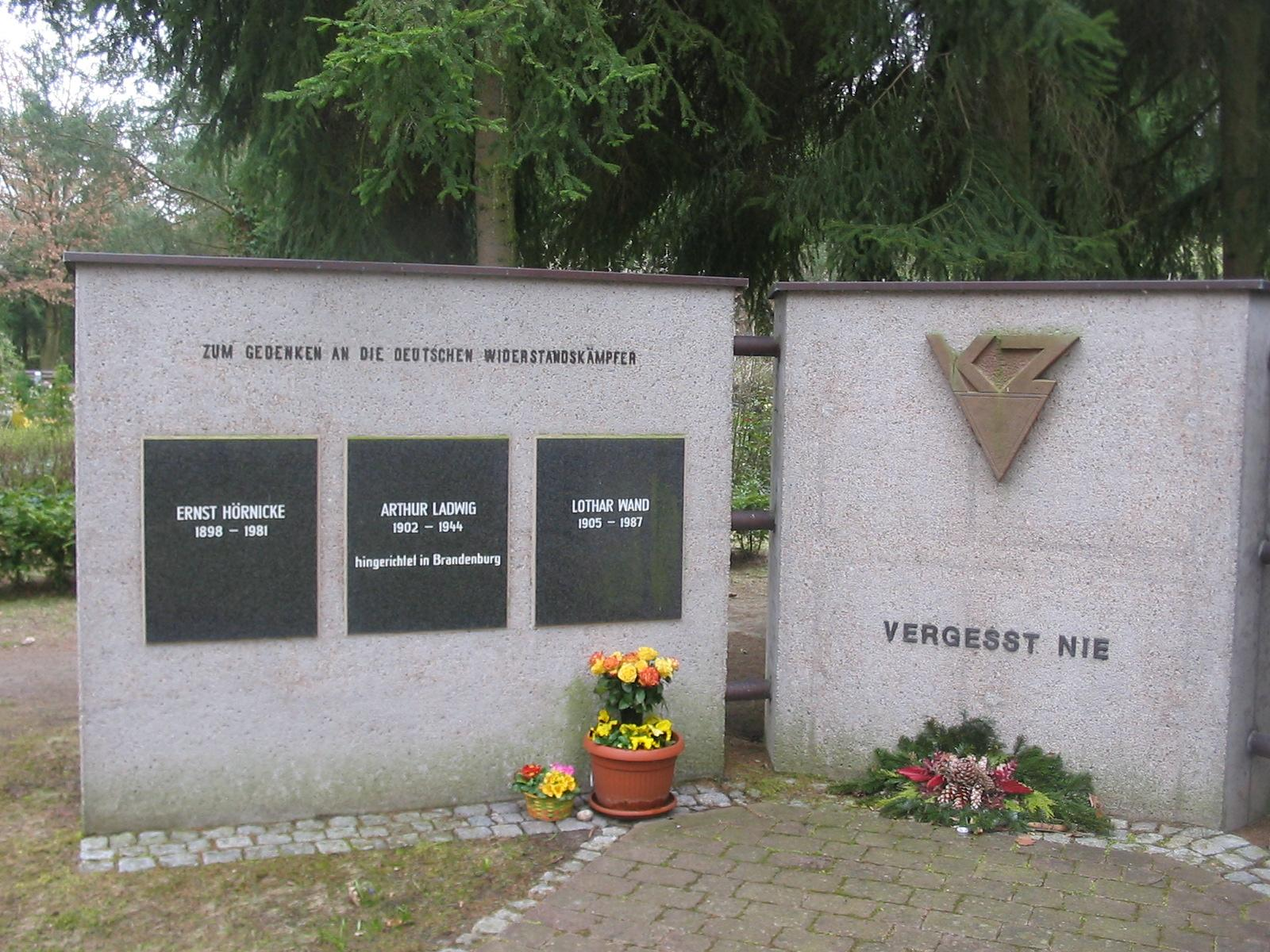
Memorial to victims killed at Genshagen

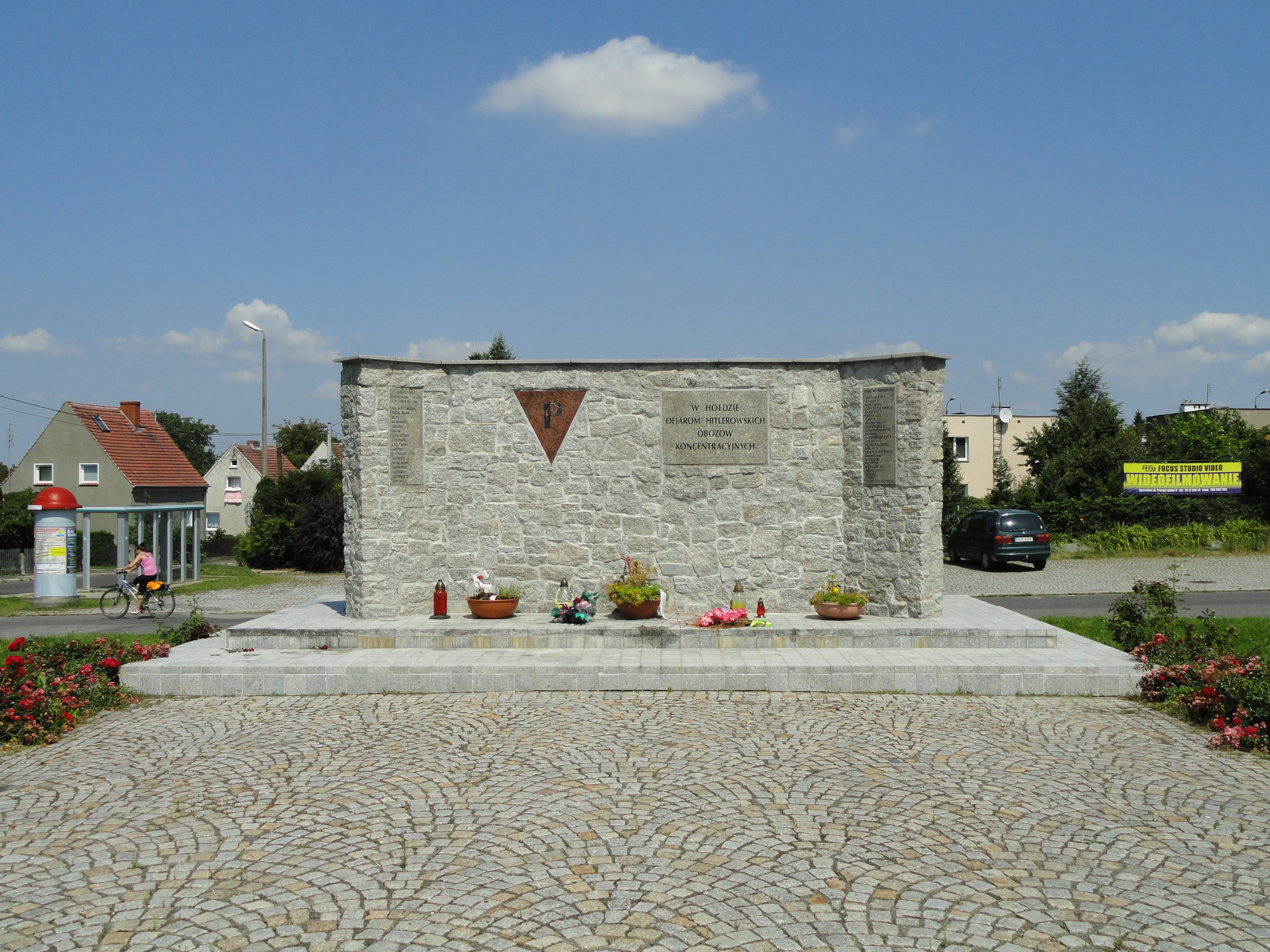
P-triangle at a Zgorzelec memorial

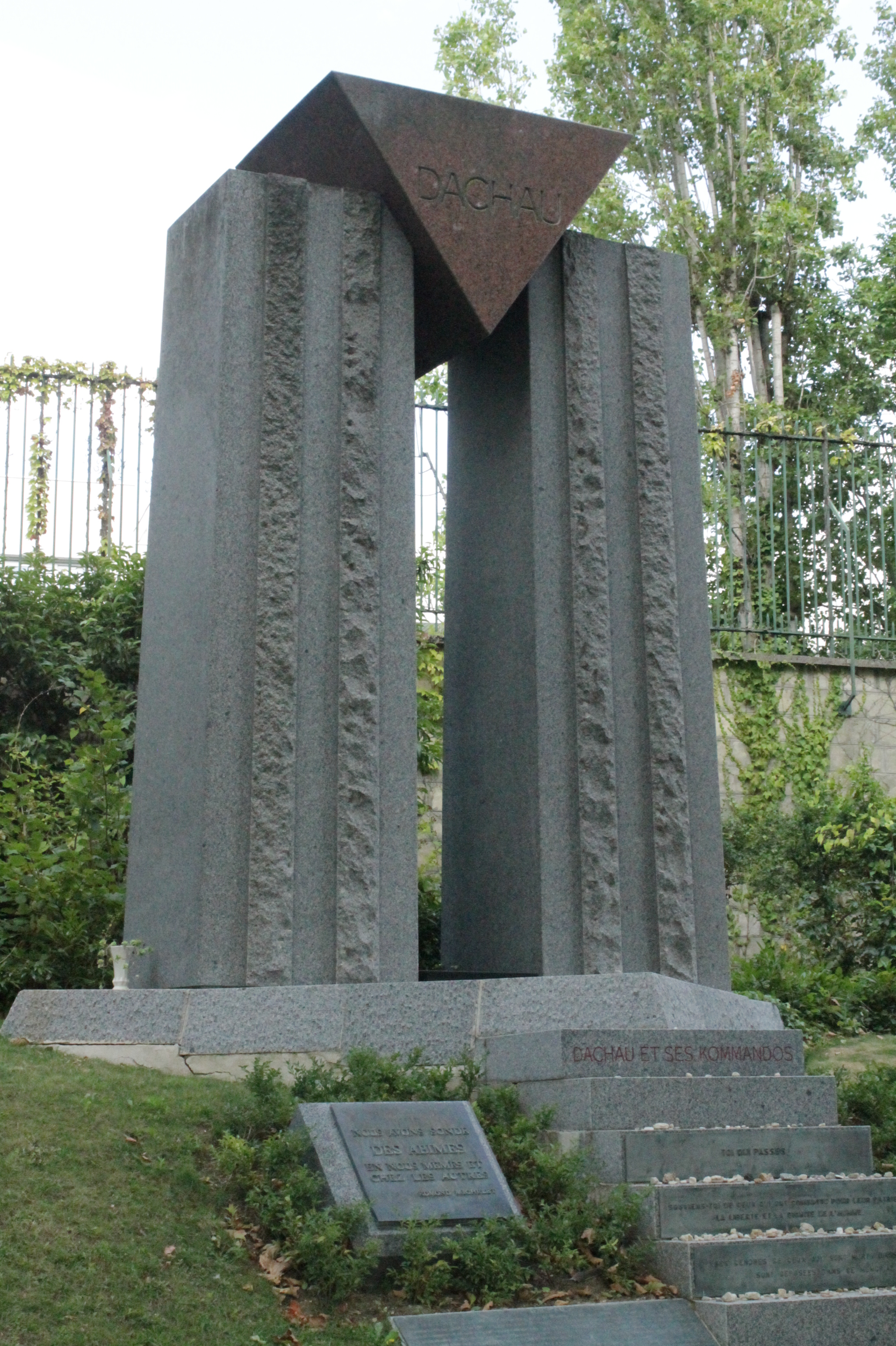
Memorial to French victims of Dachau in Paris. (Note: at Père Lachaise Cemetery)

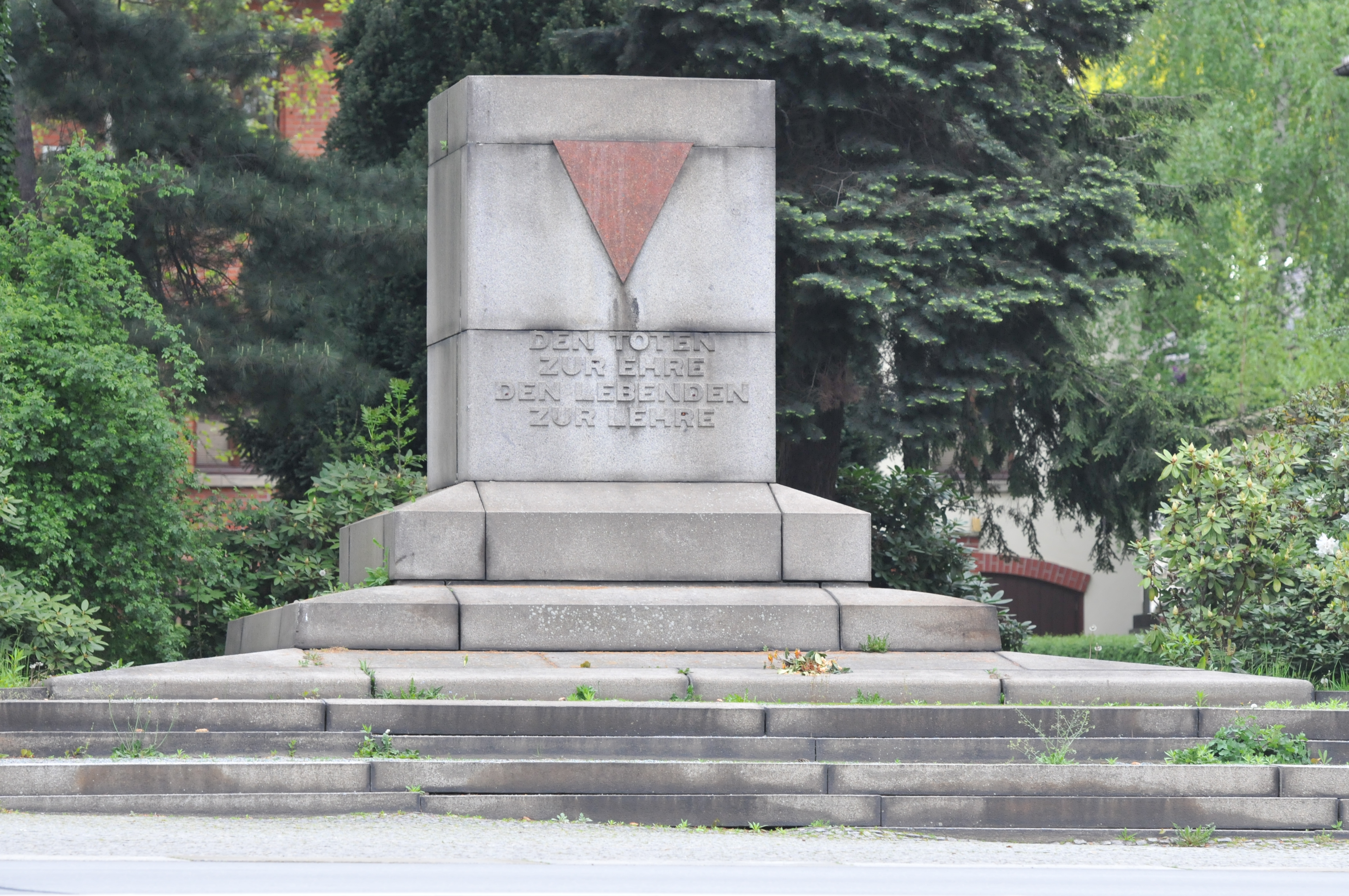
Triangle on the memorial to forced labor deaths at the truck factory in Zittau

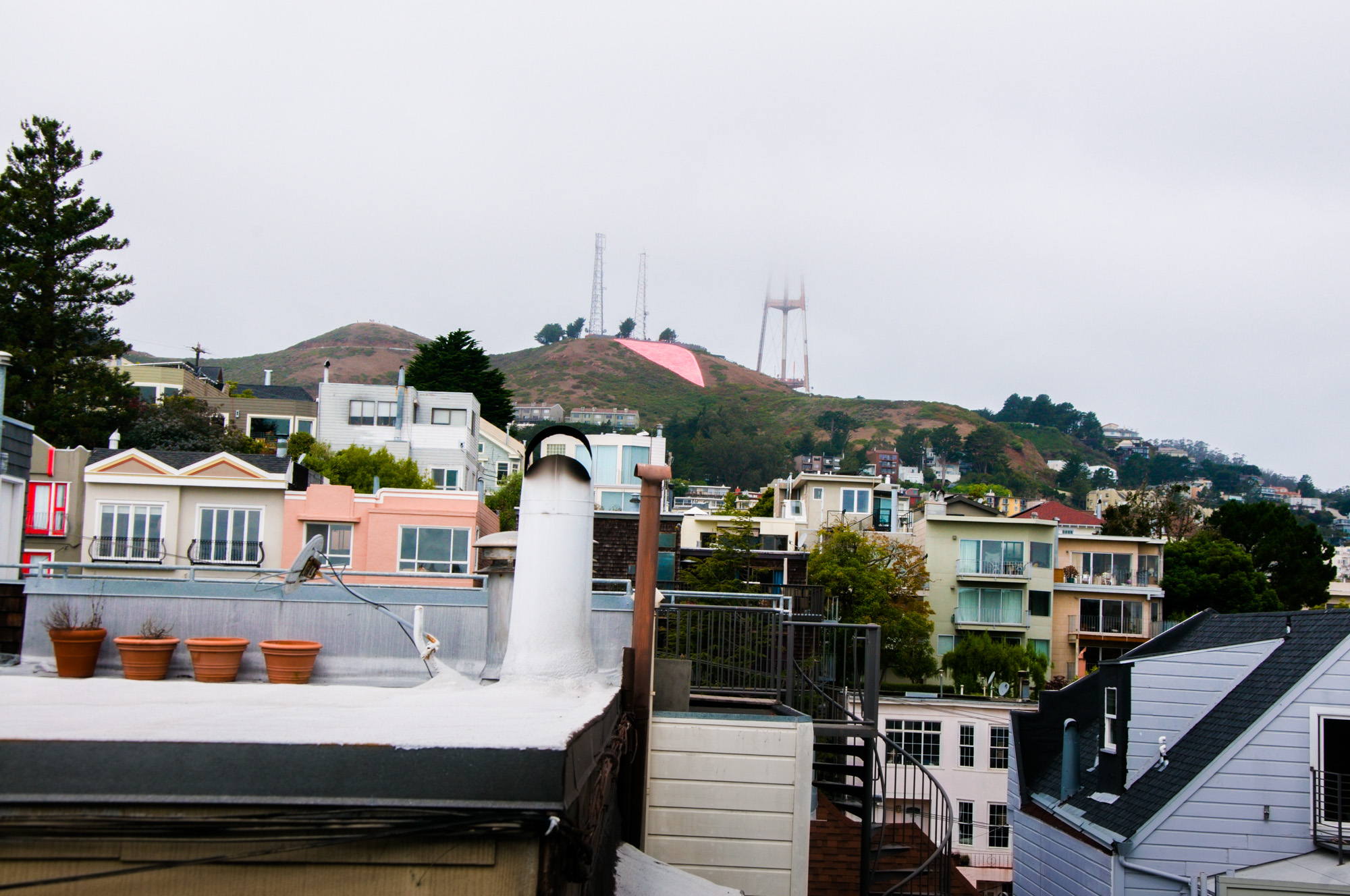
Every year, a pink triangle is erected on Twin Peaks in San Francisco during Pride weekend.

== Summary table of camp inmate markings ==
Prisoner category	Politisch (political prisoner)	Berufsverbrecher (professional criminal)	Emigrant (foreign forced laborer)	Bibelforscher Bible Student (Jehovah's Witnesses)	Homosexuell (homosexual male or sex offender)	"Arbeitsscheu" (work‑shy) or "Asozial" (asocial)	Zigeuner ("Gypsy") Roma or Sinti male
Colours	Red	Green	Blue	Purple	Pink	Black	Brown
Triangles							
Markings for repeaters							
Inmates of Strafkompanie (punishment companies)							
Markings for Jews							
Nationality markings	Political prisoner nationality markings used the capital letter of the name of the country on a red triangle		Belgier (Belgian)	Tscheche (Czech)	Franzose (French)	Pole (Polish)	Spanier (Spanish)
Special markings	Jüdischer Rassenschänder (Jewish race defiler)	Rassenschänderin (Female race defiler)	Escape suspect	Häftlingsnummer (Inmate number)	Kennzeichen für Funktionshäftlinge (Special inmates' brown armband)		Enemy POW or deserter
Example		Marks were worn in descending order as follows: inmate number, repeater bar, triangle or star, member of penal battalion, escape suspect. In this example, the inmate is a Jewish-Romani convict with multiple convictions, serving in a Strafkompanie (penal unit) and who is suspected of trying to escape.					

== See also ==
=== Related topics ===
- Committees for the Victims of Fascism (German: OdF-Ausschüsse)
- Dehumanisation – Behavior or process that undermines individuality of and in others
- Identification of inmates in Nazi concentration camps
- LGBTQ symbols § Triangle badges of Nazi Germany
- German-occupied Europe – Aspect of World War II
- Resistance during World War II – Irregular forces in World War II
- Victims of Nazi Germany

=== Badge symbols ===
- Black triangle (badge) – Nazi concentration camp badge for "asocials"
- Brown triangle – Genocide of the Romani in Europe during World War II
- P (Nazi symbol) – Sign for Polish workers during the NS-Regime in Nazi Germany
- Pink triangle – Symbol for the LGBTQIA+ community
- Purple triangle – Badge used in Nazi concentration camps to identify Jehovah's Witnesses
- Red triangle (badge) – Symbol of anti-fascism
