= Red triangle (badge) =

Symbol of anti-fascism

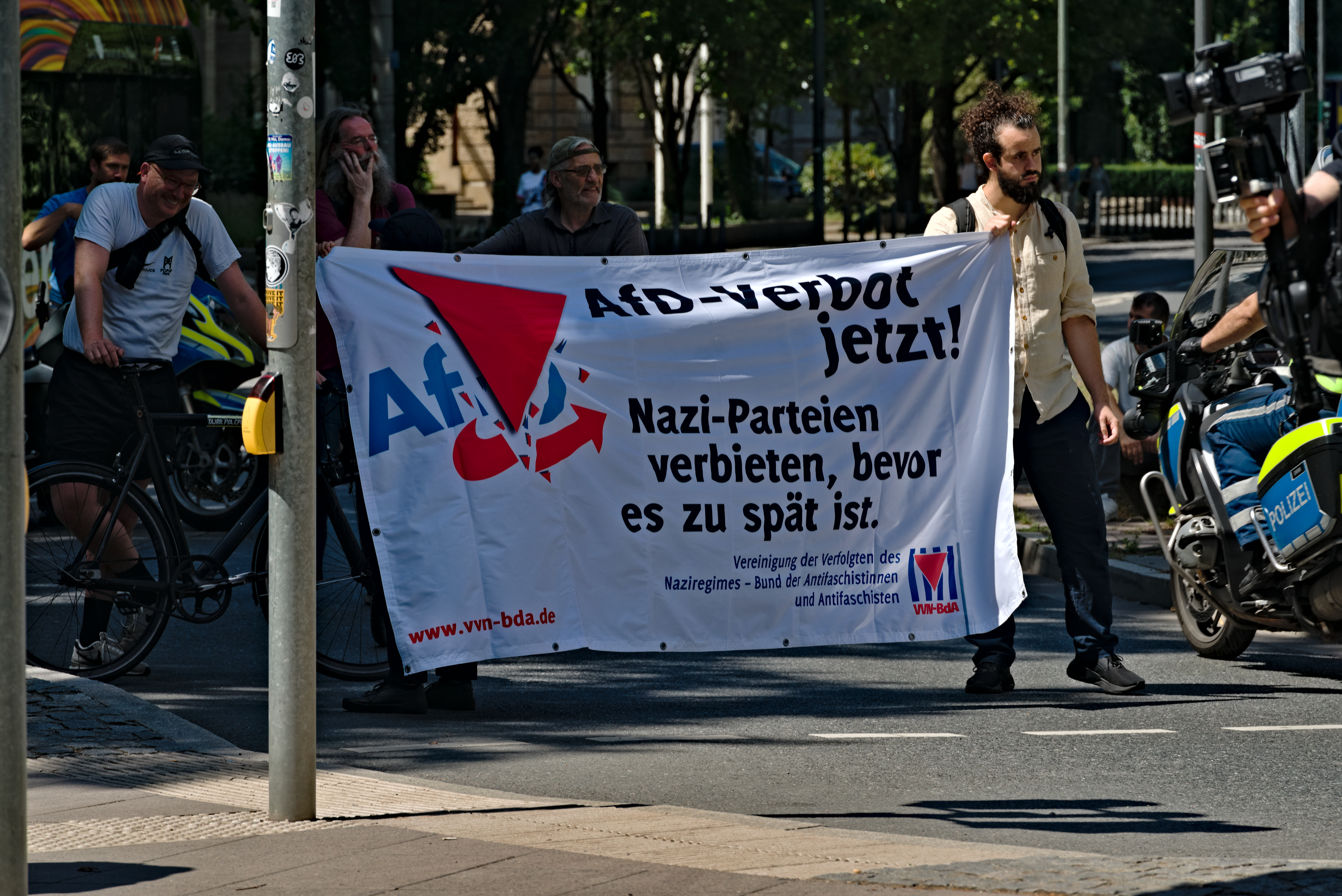
VVN-BdA protest in 2025 against the AfD. (Note: Association of Persecutees of the Nazi Regime – Federation of Antifascists (VVN-BdA) protest banner at a protest against Alternative for Germany in Frankfurt in 2025. Translation: "Ban the AfD now! Ban Nazi parties, before it's too late".)

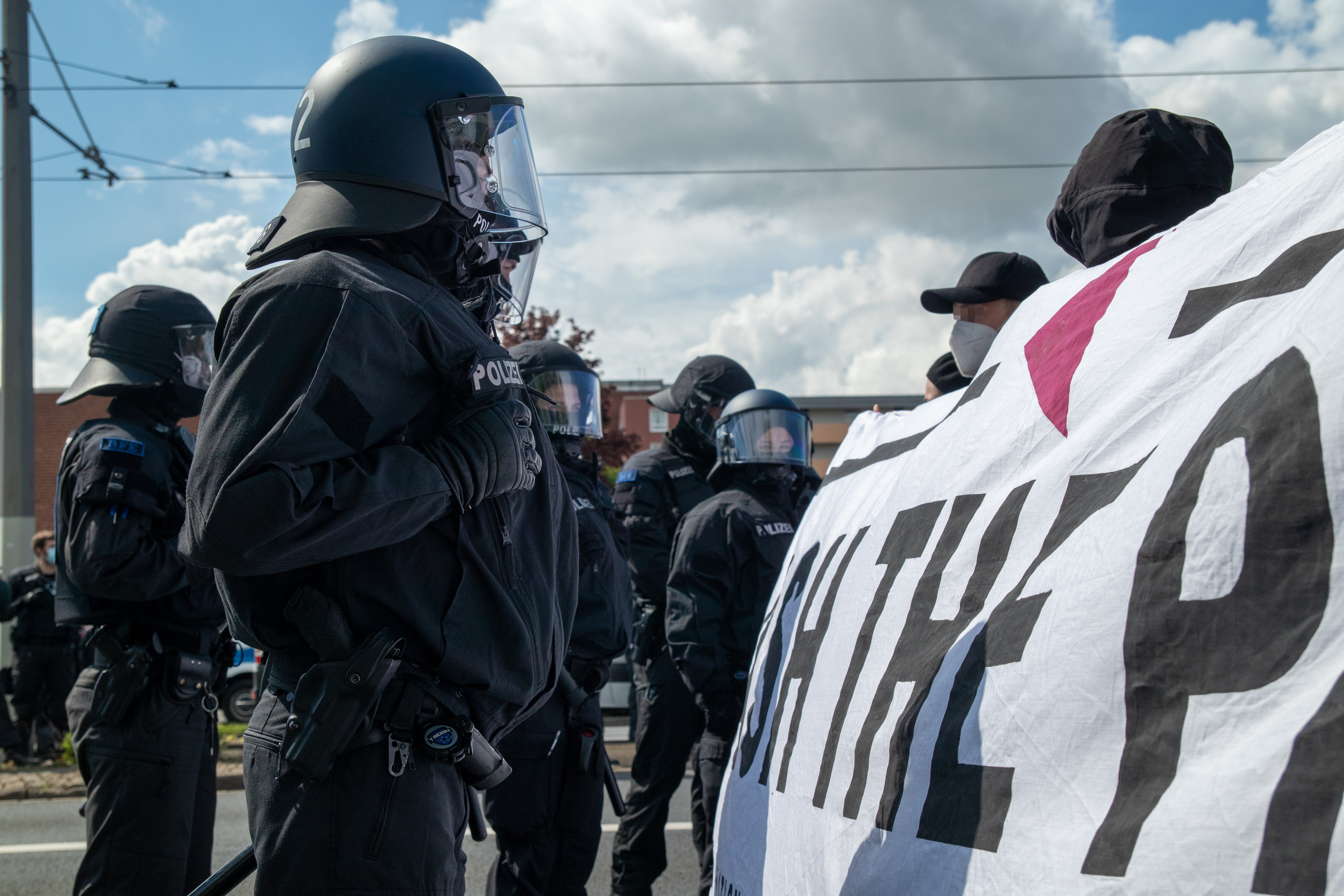
Protest against Alternative for Germany (AfD) in 2021. (Note: Image from a protest in Braunschweig, Lower Saxony in 2021. The banner says "crash the party" (in English) with Nationalismus ist keine Alternative (NIKA, English: Nationalism is not an alternative) underneath, and had been used at earlier protests as well.)

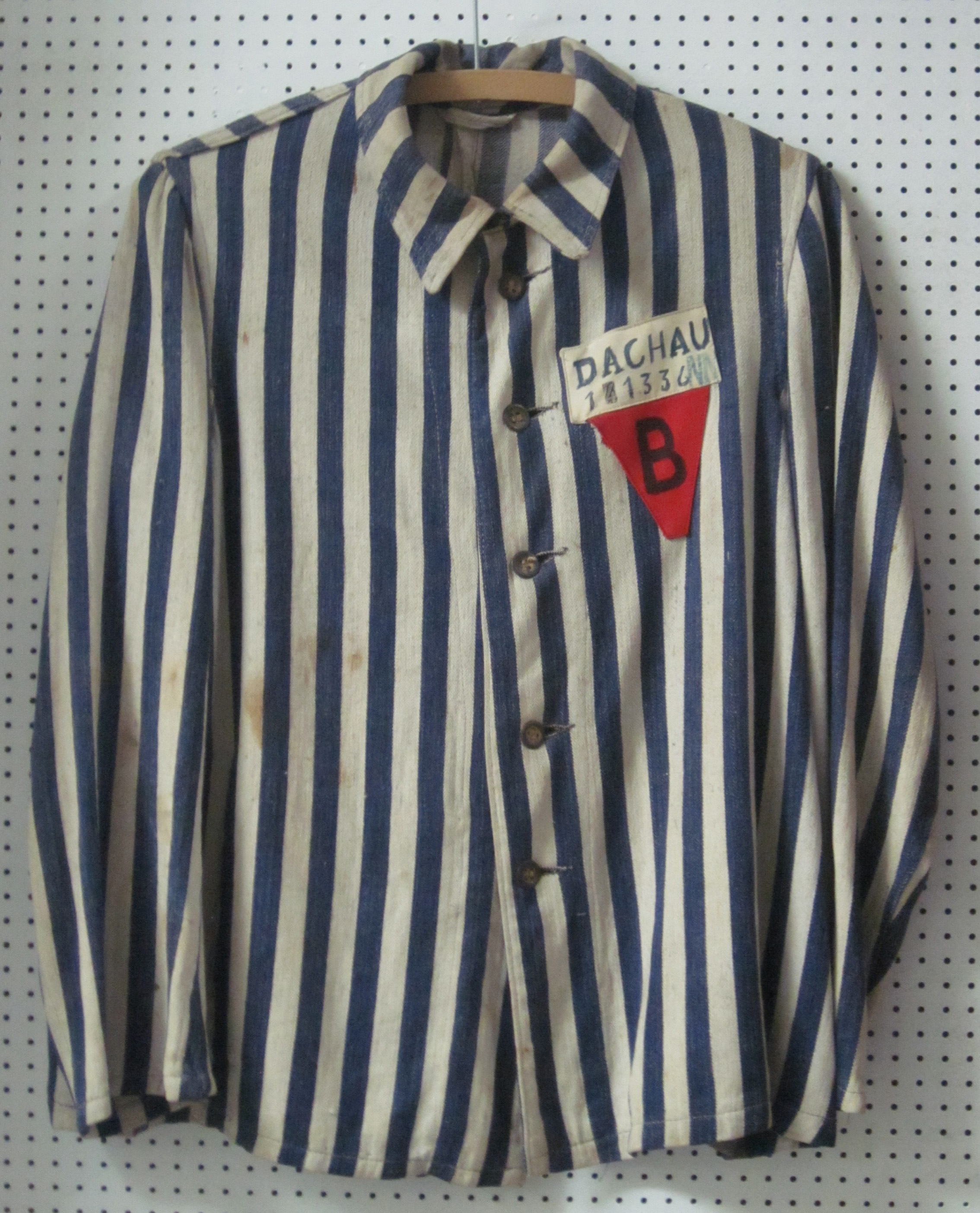
Dachau uniform at Belgium's National Museum of the Resistance

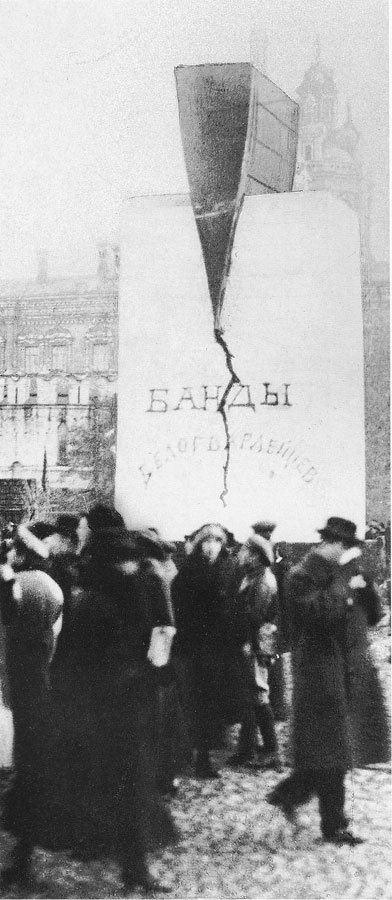
The Red Wedge, Nikolai Kolli, 1918

The red triangle, also known as the red wedge, was a required badge worn by left-wing dissidents incarcerated in Nazi concentration camps during World War Two. An upward-pointing red triangle patch designated prisoners within the jurisdiction of the Wehrmacht, including prisoners of war, spies, and military deserters. An inverted red triangle was worn by political prisoners, including resistance fighters. The red triangle designated communists, liberals, anarchists, Social Democrats, and Freemasons, among others. After the war, the inverted red triangle symbol was reclaimed by anti-fascists in Europe, in a way similar to the reclamation of the pink triangle used to mark gay prisoners. The reclaimed red triangle symbol has been used as the logo of the Association of Persecutees of the Nazi Regime – Federation of Antifascists in Germany and numerous other post-war remembrances and memorial groups. It has also been worn as a lapel pin by left-wing politicians from Belgium, France, and Spain.

Other left-wing, anti-fascist, and resistance groups have used red triangle or red wedge symbols that reference images from before World War II. One of these is Beat the Whites with the Red Wedge, a 1919 propaganda poster by El Lissitzky. An earlier image recalled by some labour movements is an equilateral triangle representing eight hours of work, eight hours of leisure, and eight hours of sleep in a 24-hour day.

In 2020, Donald Trump's presidential re-election campaign attracted controversy for its use of the symbol in social media advertisements attacking his opponents, whom he described as "Antifa."

== Before Nazi Germany ==
=== Eight-hour workday ===
The red triangle has been a left-wing political symbol since the 19th century. On Labor Day in 1890 in France, workers wore a red triangle as a symbol of the eight-hour working day they were fighting for; the three points of the triangle represented 8 hours of work, 8 hours of rest, and 8 hours of leisure. The red triangle is still used with this meaning in some parts of Europe, in conjunction with Labour Day celebrations on 8 May.

In July 1889 in Paris, the Second International, the workers' association of European socialist and workers' parties, decided that workers would demonstrate on May 1 of the following year to demand the eight-hour working day. The red leather triangle was adopted on 1 May 1890 in Paris during the workers' struggles so that demonstrators could distinguish themselves from uninvolved citizens. The inscription "1 May, 8 hours of work" was sewn onto red triangle badges for the demonstration.

Following the immense success of the 1 May 1890 mobilization – in Belgium, 150,000 workers went on strike – the date was designated International Workers' Day (French: Journée internationale des travailleurs). The eight-hour day was obtained in 1919 in France and in 1921 in Belgium.

Advertisements for 'Three 8' brand soap (Note: 'Three 8' referred to 8 hours of work, 8 hours of leisure, and 8 hours of sleep.) (Note: Media related to Workers' Soap Factory at Wikimedia Commons)

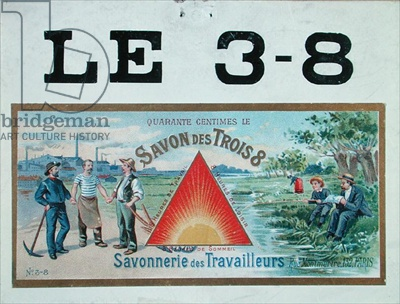
'3x8' brand soap

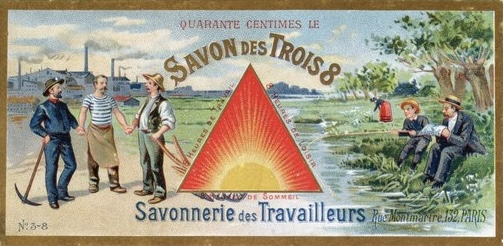
French: Savon des Trois 8, lit. 'Soap of the Three 8'

=== El Lissitzky's Red Wedge ===
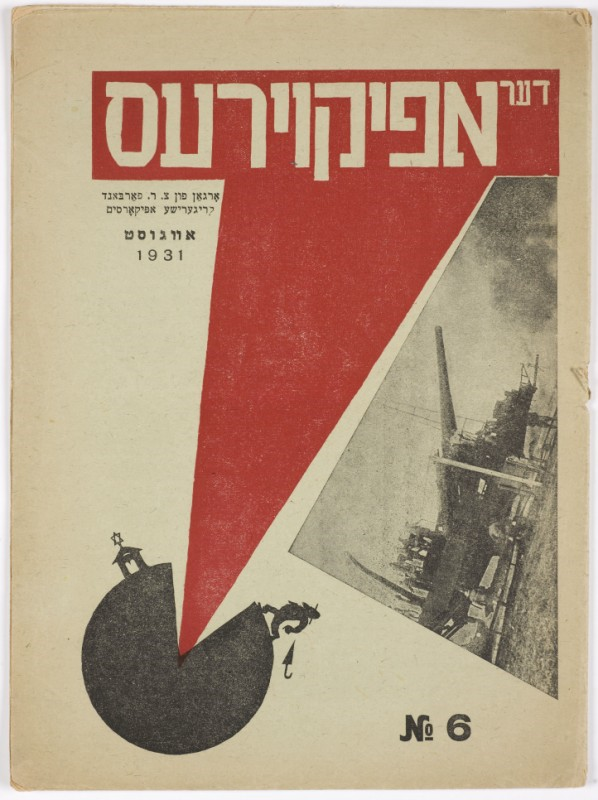
Cover of Der Apikojres № 6 (Yiddish: דער אפיקוירעס), by El Lissitzky in 1931 (a periodical published by the League of Militant Atheists).

Symbols similar to the red triangle were used in far-left politics in early 20th century Russia. A red triangle or red wedge features on some early communist posters. A red wedge appeared in a 1919 Soviet propaganda poster by constructivist artist El Lissitzky, entitled "Beat the Whites with the Red Wedge", referring to the anti-communist White movement, which was defeated by the Red Army during the Russian Civil War. The title, allegedly recommended by Ilya Ehrenburg, is possibly a response to the pogrom slogan "Beat the Jews!" (Russian: Бей жидов!, romanized: Bej zhidov!). The full slogan was Beat the Jews – save Russia! (Russian: Бей жидов — спасай Россию!), and it was predominantly used by right-wing monarchists and their militant Black Hundreds.

Numerous modern left-wing groups and publications have used symbols that reference the red wedge, or the reclamation of the red triangle badge that the Nazis used to mark their political opponents, or both. The black flag used by modern anti-fascists (Antifa) also dates back to the era of the Russian Revolution. The El Lissitzky poster was the namesake of the 1980s British left-wing musical collective Red Wedge. The group opposed British conservatives but did not describe themselves as communist.

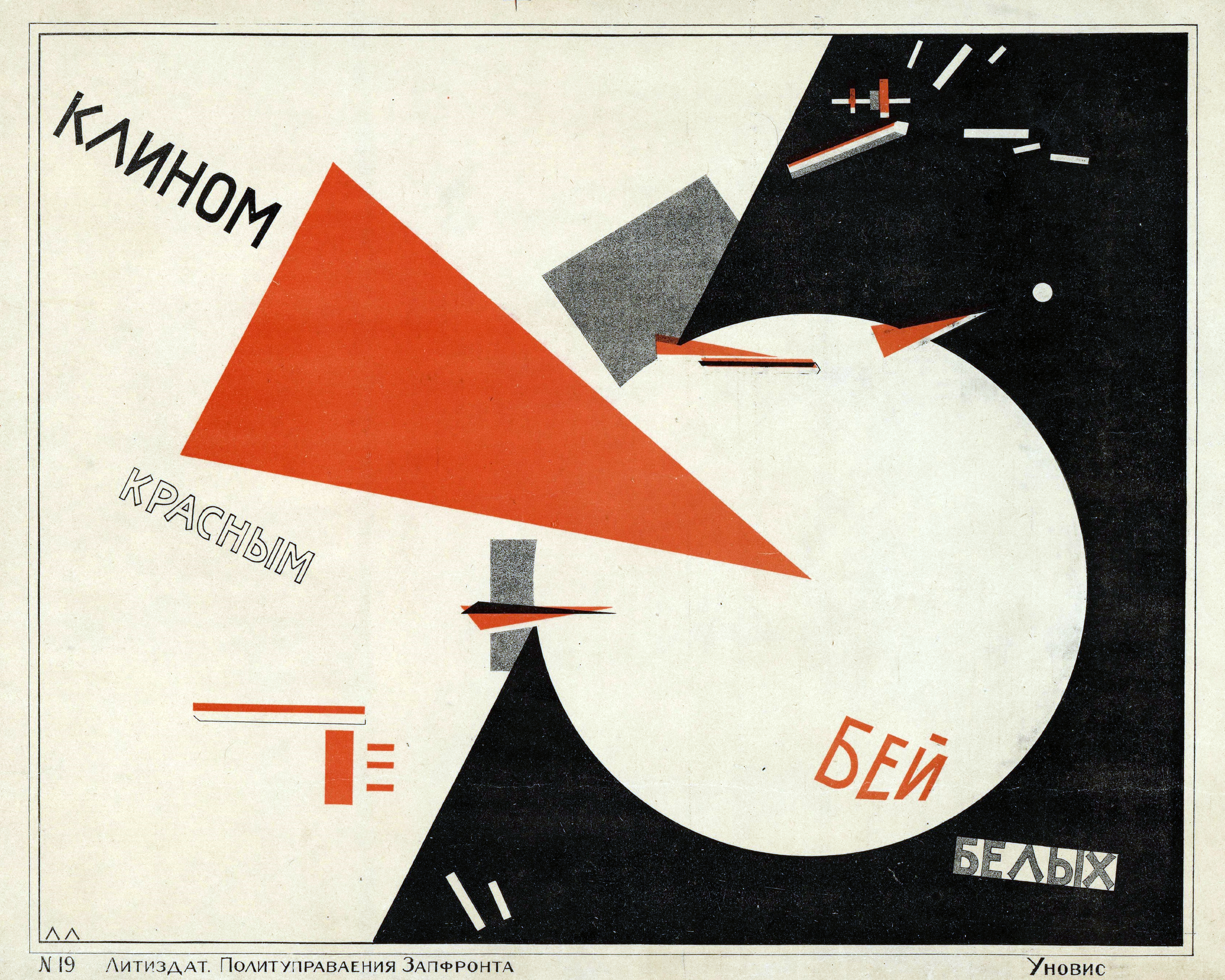
El Lissitzky's 1919 anti-White movement poster, Beat the Whites with the Red Wedge (Russian: Клином красным бей белых).

== Opponents of the Nazi Party ==
=== Background to Nazi persecution of left-wing opponents ===
The colour of the symbol comes from the party colours of the Communist Party of Germany, one of the first groups detained in the Nazi concentration camps. Nazi crackdowns on their left-wing political enemies started very early. The poem First They Came by Martin Niemöller, a German priest, begins, "When the Nazis came for the communists, I kept quiet; I wasn't a communist" (German: Als die Nazis die Kommunisten holten). The most common English version begins, "First they came for the Communists". In a 2024 article about the origins of the red triangle symbol, Germany's public broadcaster Deutsche Welle reported, "At first, the majority of political inmates were German Social Democrats or Communists and the red of the triangle referred to their party colors.. most were non-Germans from across the political spectrum who had opposed National Socialism or Nazi Germany's occupation of their countries".

=== The red triangle badge in Nazi concentration camps ===
Red triangle
prisoner categories
communists
social democrats
liberals
members of the Resistance
anarchists
trade unionists
Freemasons
Strasserists

Red inverted triangle badges were worn by political prisoners in Nazi concentration camps. The red triangle was only used for Jewish prisoners in unusual circumstances, such as when the Nazi authorities were unaware that the prisoner was Jewish.

German communists were among the first to be imprisoned in concentration camps. Their ties to the USSR concerned Hitler, and the Nazi Party was intractably opposed to communism. Rumours of communist violence were spread by the Nazis to justify the Enabling Act of 1933, which gave Hitler his first dictatorial powers. Hermann Göring testified at Nuremberg that Nazi willingness to repress German communists prompted Hindenburg and the old elite to cooperate with them. Hitler and the Nazis also despised German leftists because of their resistance to Nazi racism. Hitler referred to Marxism and "Bolshevism" as means for "the international Jew" to undermine "racial purity", stir up class tension and mobilise trade unions against the government and business. When the Nazis occupied a territory, communists, socialists and anarchists were usually among the first to be repressed. This repression included summary executions, such as Hitler's Commissar Order, in which he demanded the summary execution of all Soviet troops who were political commissars and offered resistance or were captured in battle.

Many red triangle wearers were interned at Dachau concentration camp. The triangle and star system was used at the Dachau concentration camp from 1938 to 1942.

According to the Auschwitz-Birkenau State Museum in Oświęcim, Poland, 95% of prisoners at Auschwitz concentration camp were accused of political crimes. (Note: Note: Auschwitz is the German name for Oświęcim.)

Many later political detainees were German and foreign civilian activists from across the political spectrum who opposed the Nazi regime; captured resistance fighters (many of whom were executed during — or immediately after — their interrogation, particularly in occupied Poland and France); and, sometimes, the families of political prisoners. German political prisoners were a substantial proportion of the first inmates at Dachau concentration camp. The political People's Court was notorious for the number of its death sentences.

Schematics of prisoner badge symbols in Nazi concentration camps
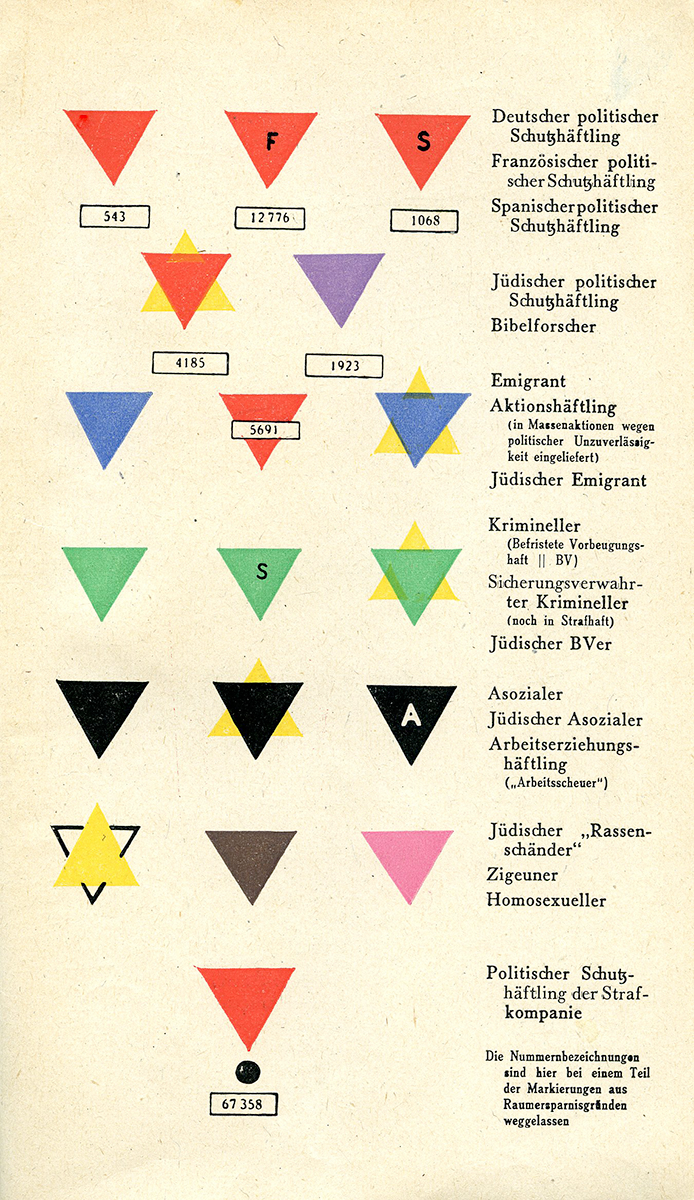
Schematic

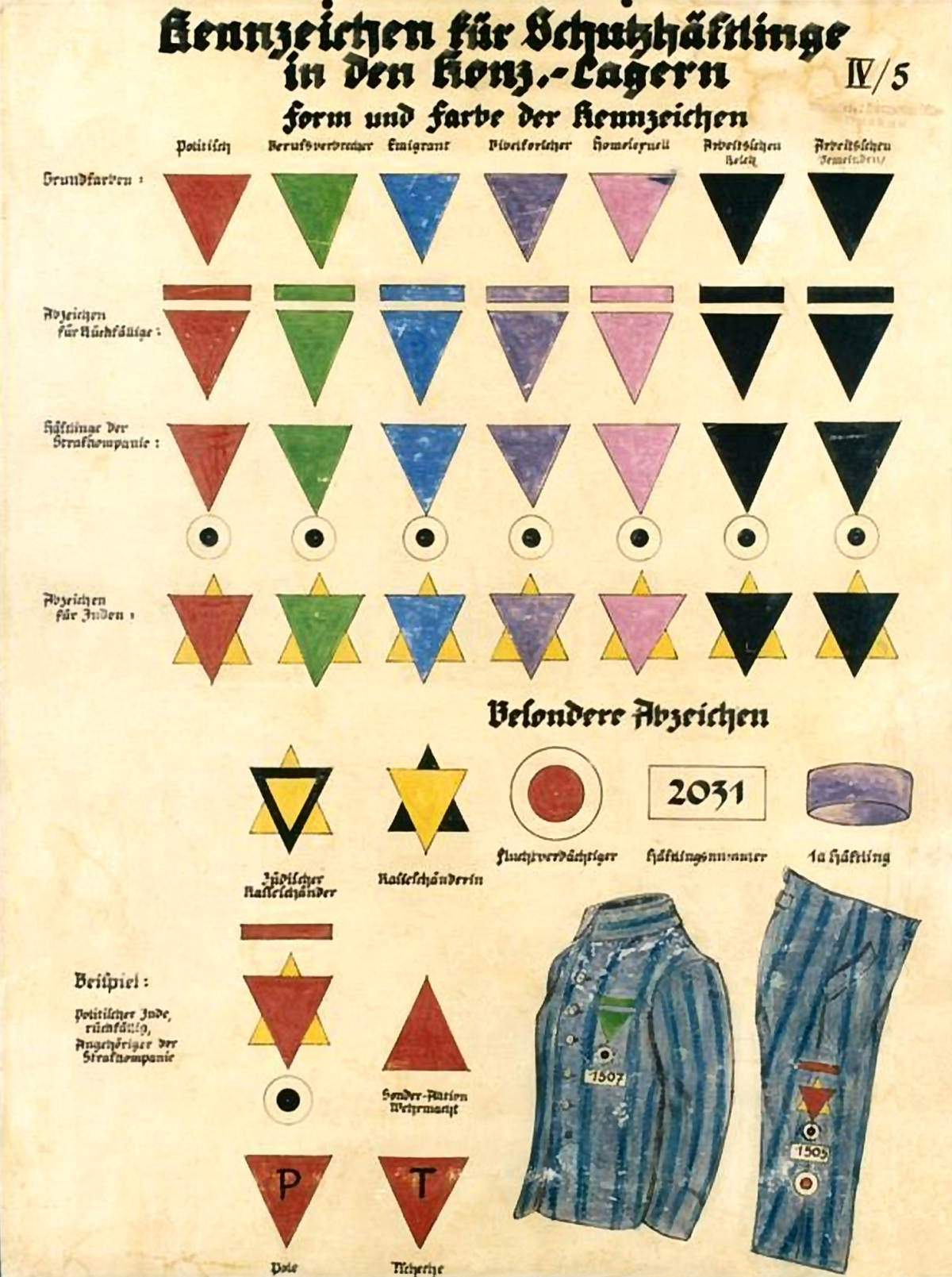
German Federal Archives

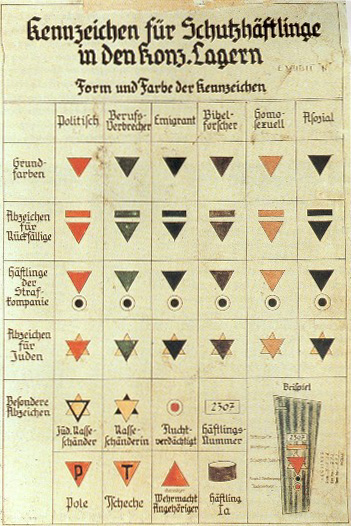
USHMM, USA

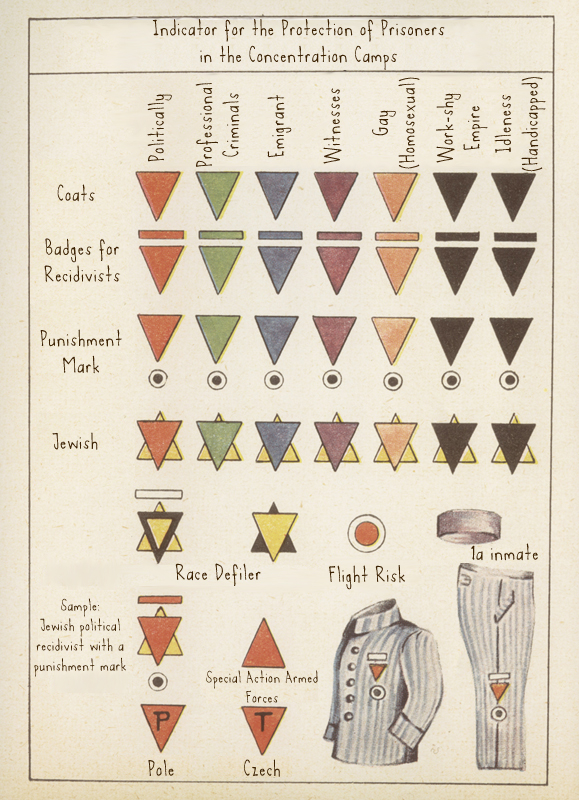
USHMM (English)

== After WWII ==
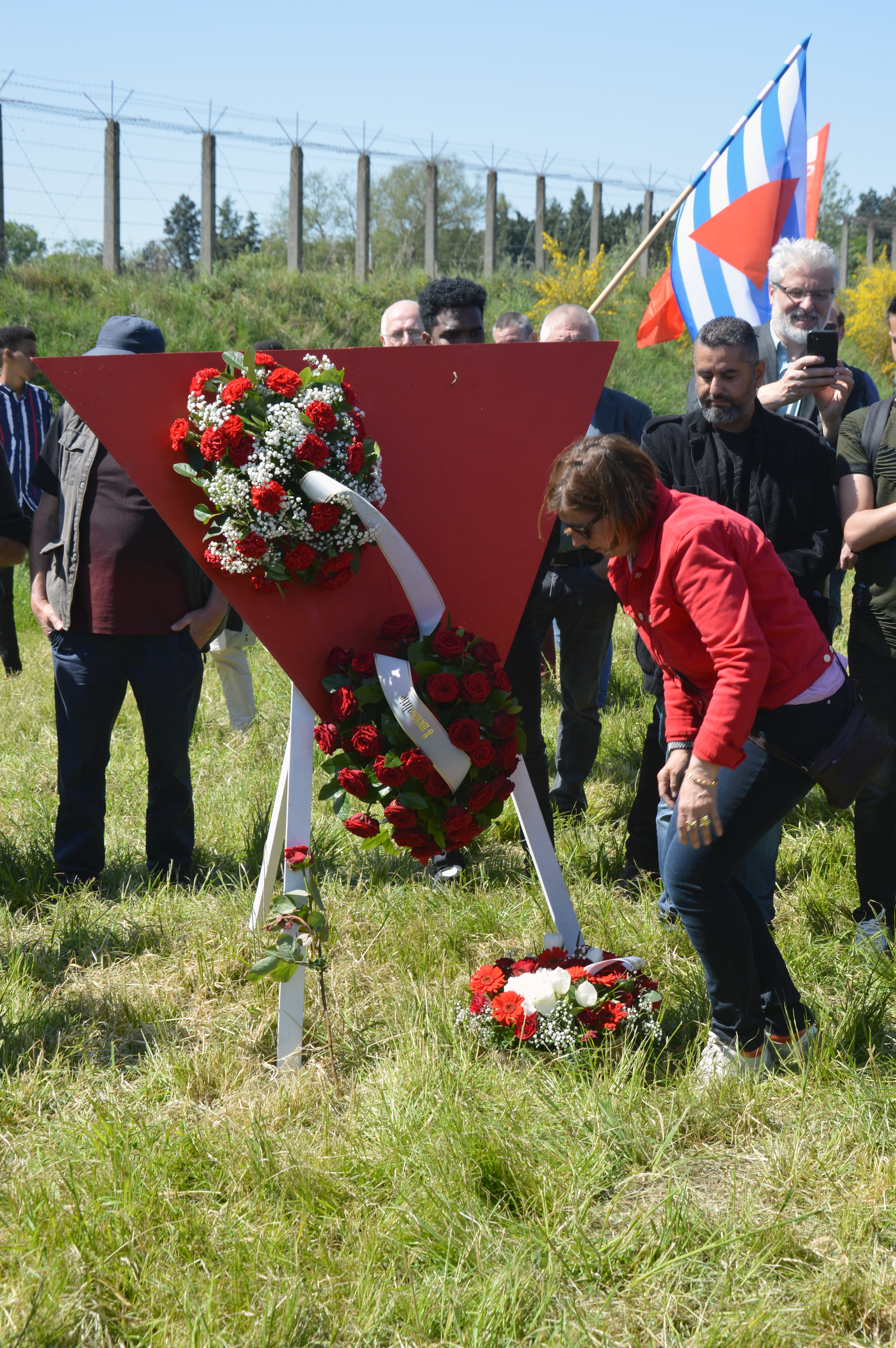
Floral tribute at the red triangle, 8 May 2022, Fort Breendonk

Since the end of World War II, the red triangle has been used as an anti-fascist symbol. The pink triangle and red triangle were both reclaimed after the war as symbols of pride and remembrance.

=== Association of Persecutees of the Nazi Regime – Federation of Antifascists ===
The Association of Persecutees of the Nazi Regime – Federation of Antifascists (German: Vereinigung der Verfolgten des Naziregimes – Bund der Antifaschistinnen und Antifaschisten, VVN-BdA) is a German political confederation founded in 1947 and based in Berlin. The VVN-BdA, formerly the VVN, emerged from victims' associations in Germany founded by political opponents to Nazism after World War II and the end of Nazi rule in Germany.

During and after the end of World War II, former resistance fighters founded "anti-fascist committees", known as "Antifas". These committees involved working class militants, especially but not only communists, and were banned immediately by the military administrations of the British and American occupation zones for being politically far left. By 26 June 1945, an "association of political prisoners and persecutees of the Nazi system" had been founded in Stuttgart. In the following weeks and months, regional groups of ex-political prisoners and other persecuted individuals formed, with the permission of the allied forces, in each of the four occupation zones.

The VVN-BdA are critical of far-right politicians in Germany and abroad. In 2025, the group claimed that "the weakening of universities has long been a declared goal of the US right".

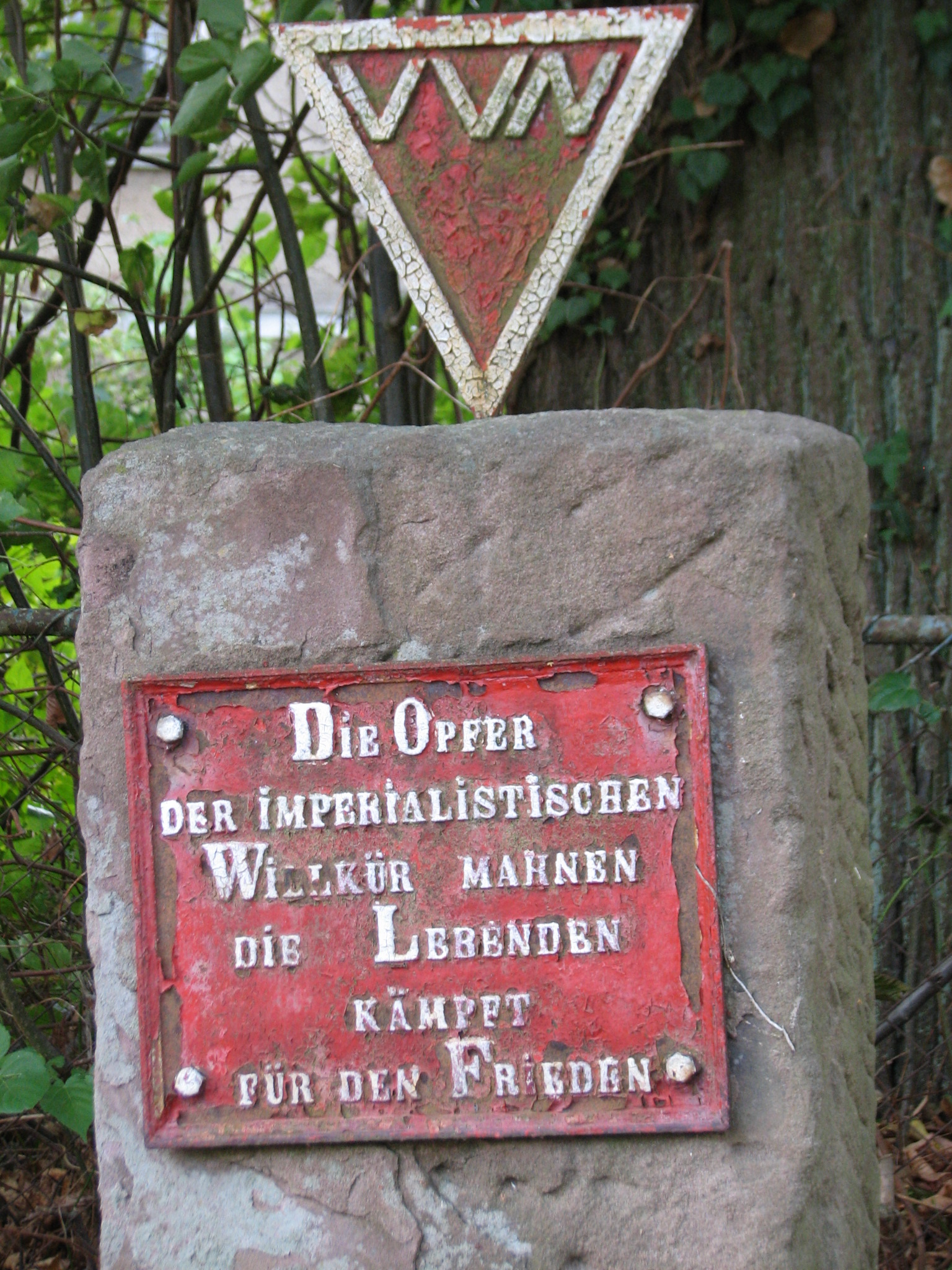
Memorial in Lüderitz, Saxony-Anhalt (Note: saying German: DIE OPFER DER IMPERIALISTISCHEN WILLKÜR MAHNEN DIE LEBENDEN KÄMPFT FÜR DEN FRIEDEN, lit. 'THE VICTIMS OF IMPERIALIST ARBITRARY WARNING THE LIVING FIGHTS FOR PEACE')

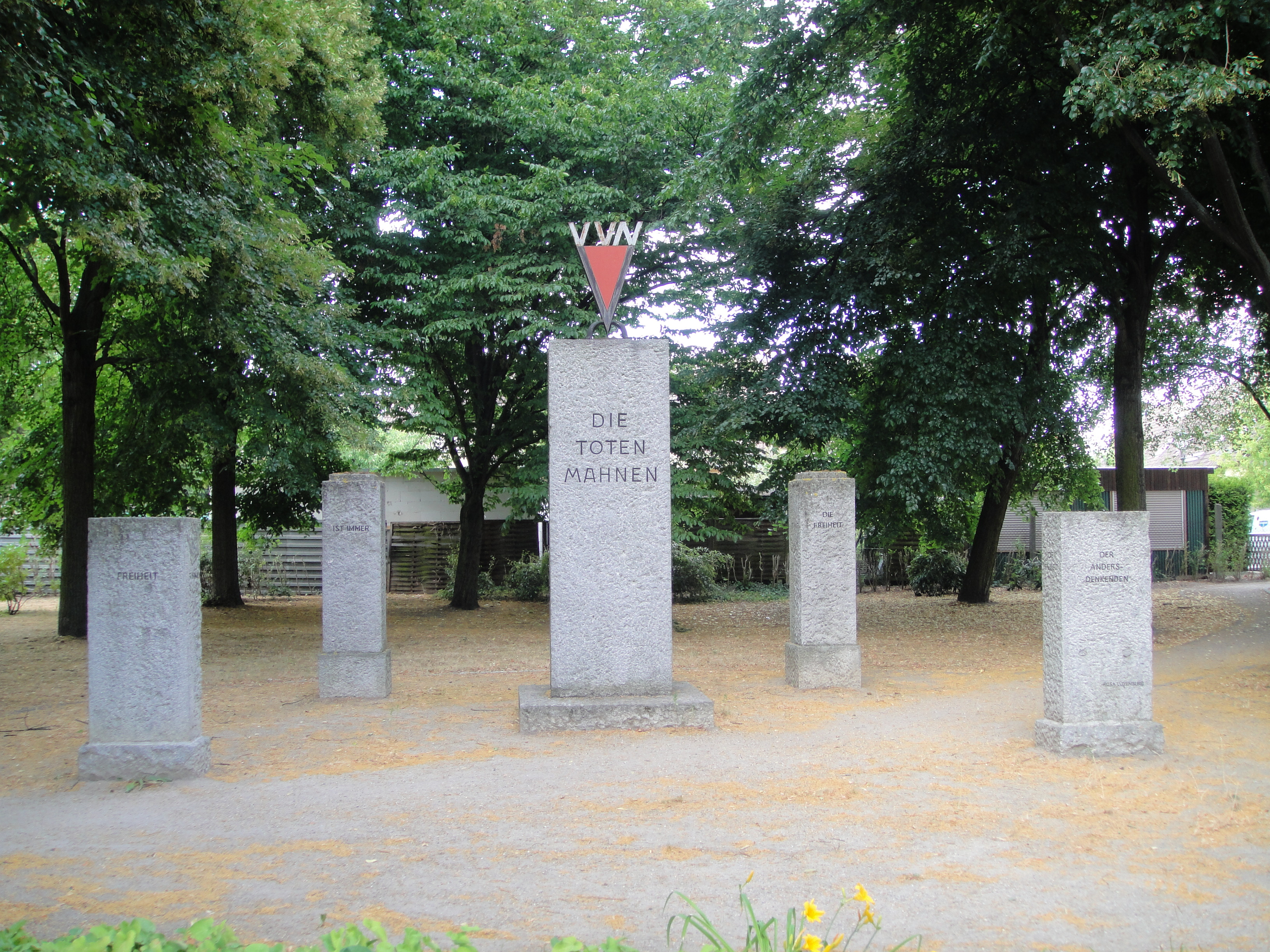
VVN memorial in Teltow with a red triangle to symbolise political prisoners

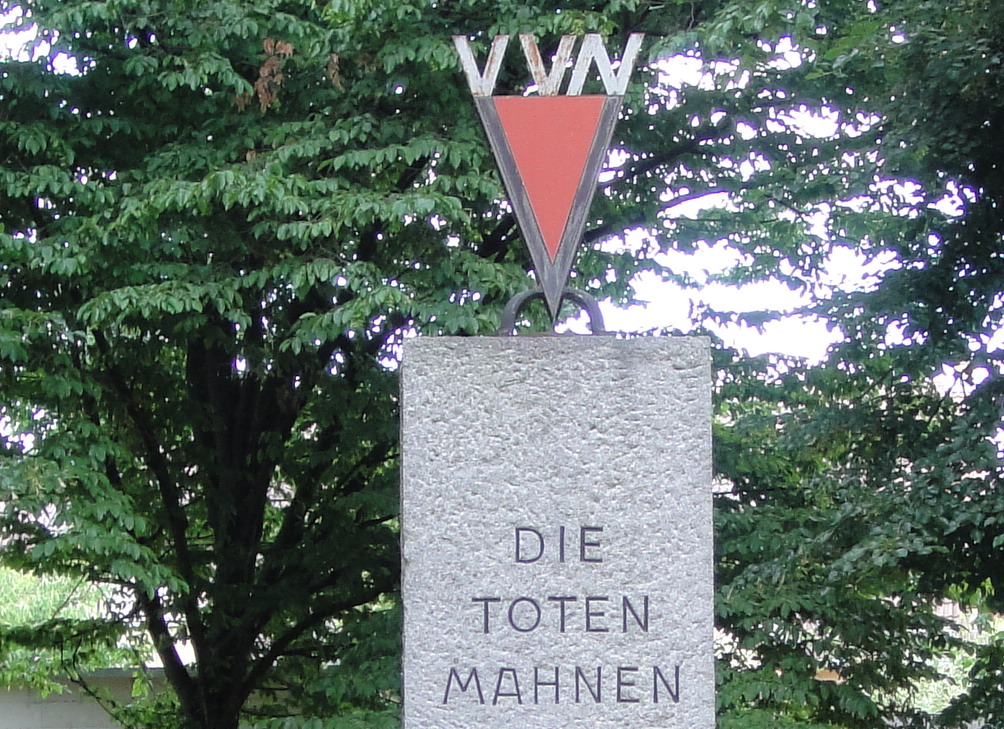
VVN memorial in Teltow (close up) German: die Toten mahnen, lit. 'the dead warn'

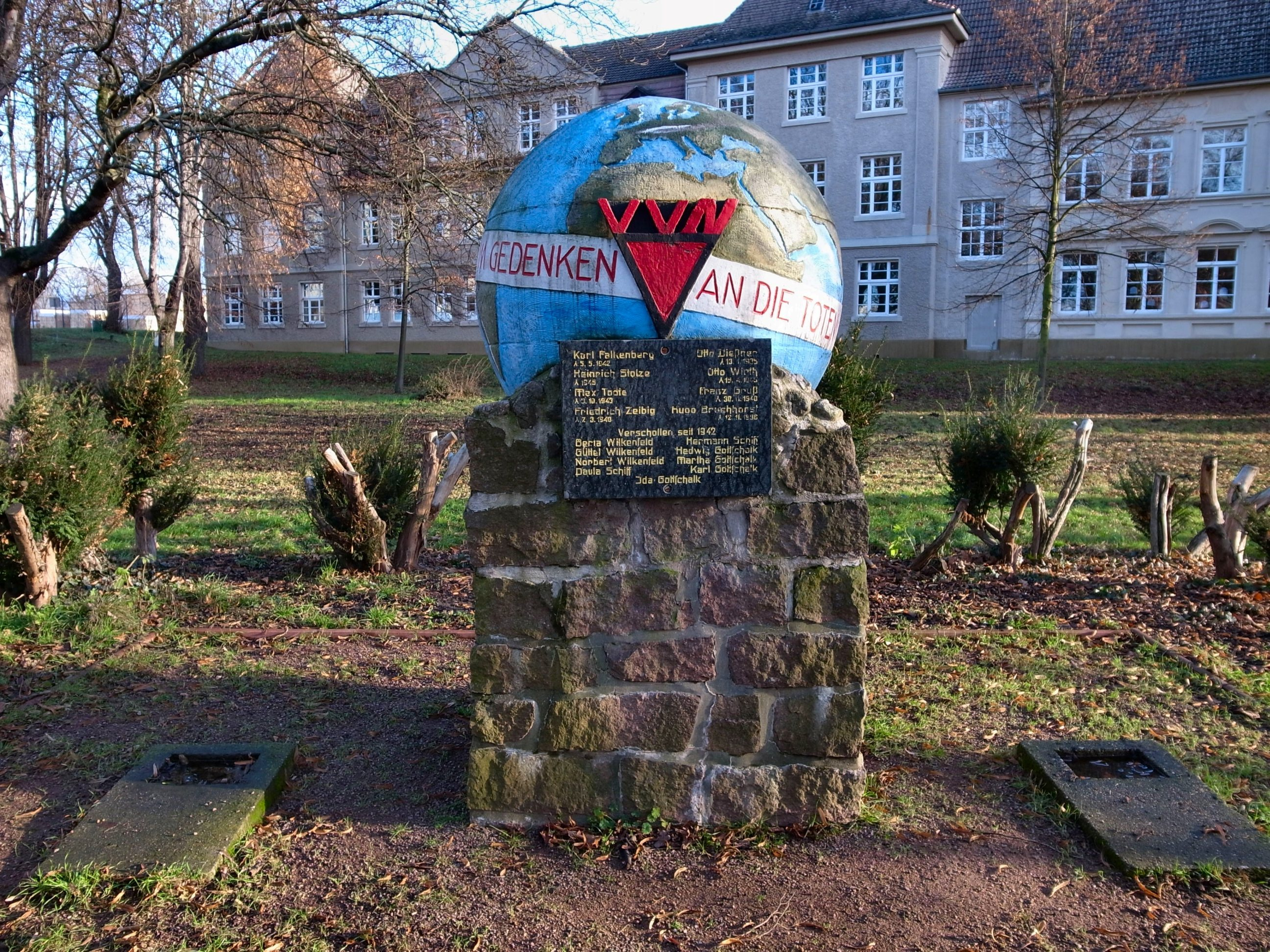
VVN memorial to the victims of fascism

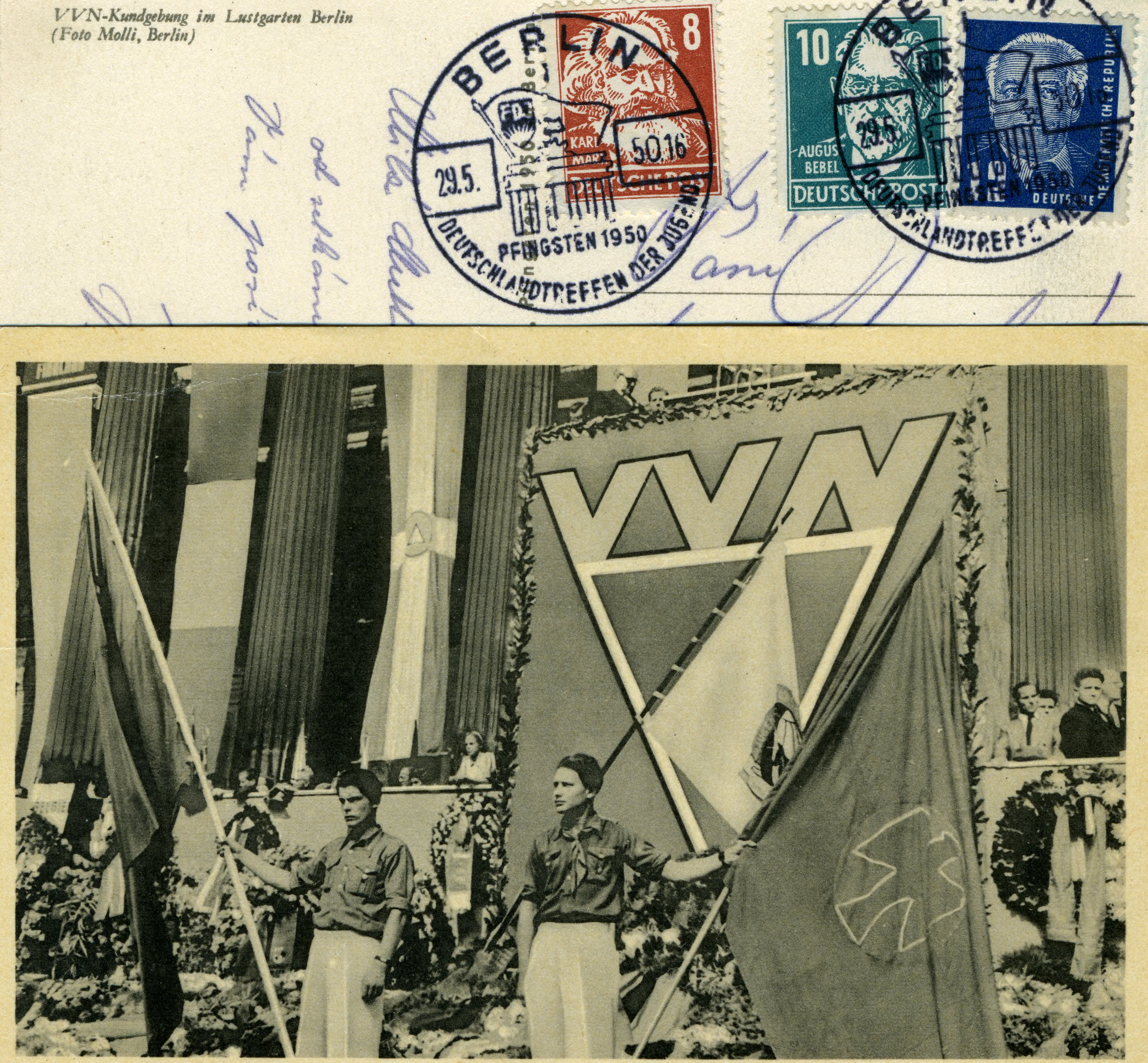
Postcard showing the VVN event in the Lustgarten, Berlin

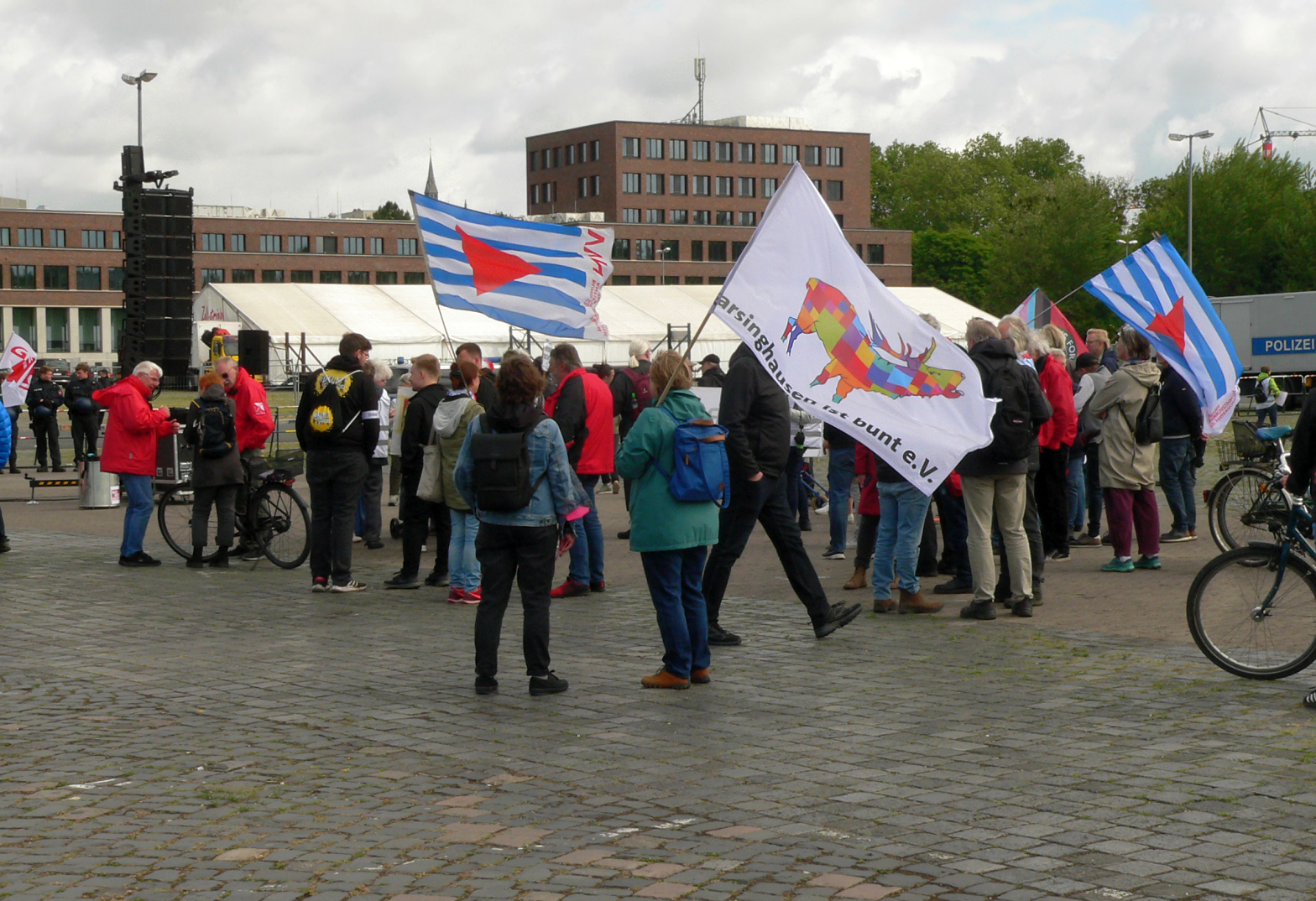
VVN-BdA flags at a protest against the AfD in Hannover, Lower Saxony in 2022.

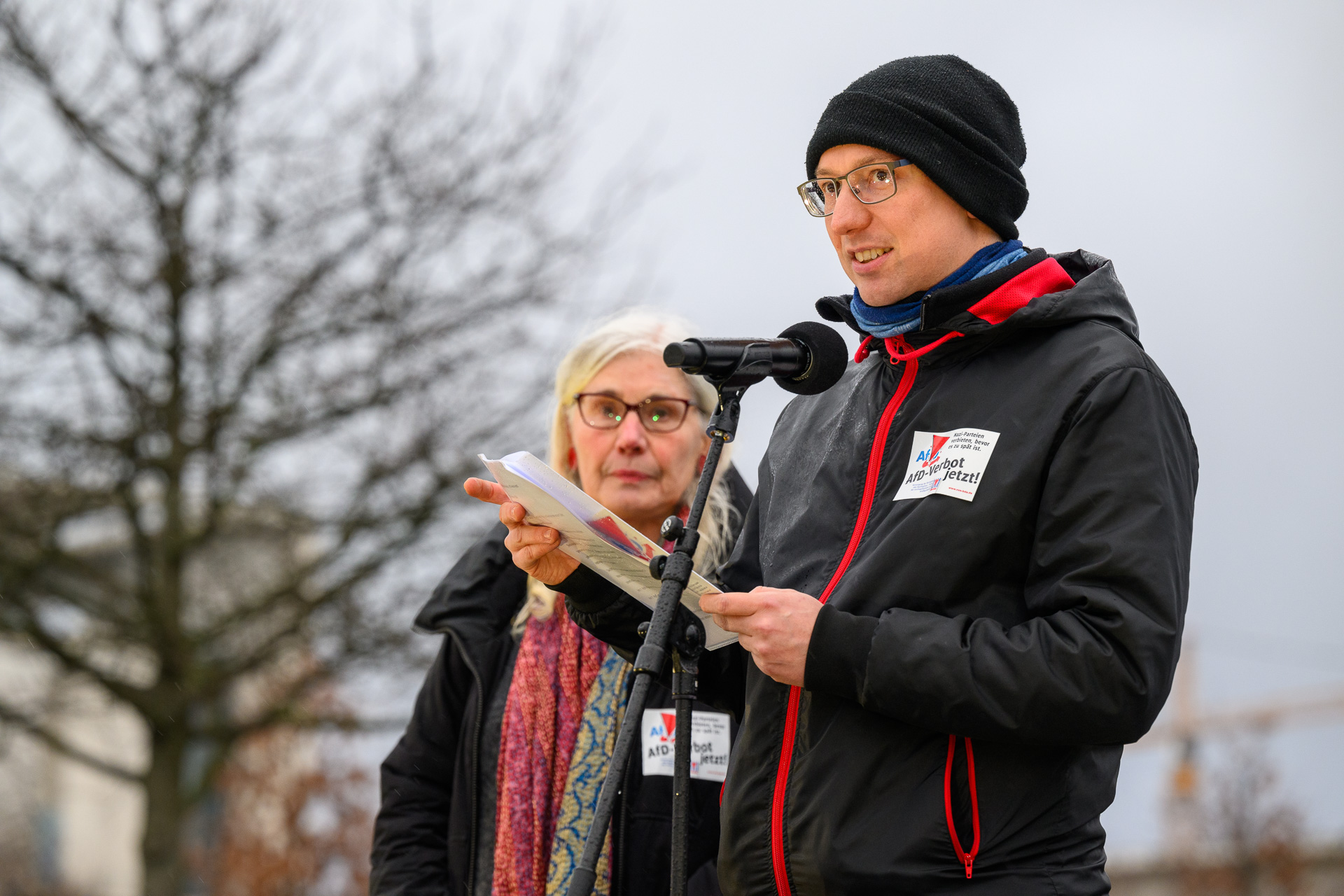
VVN-BdA members wearing red triangle anti-AfD symbols

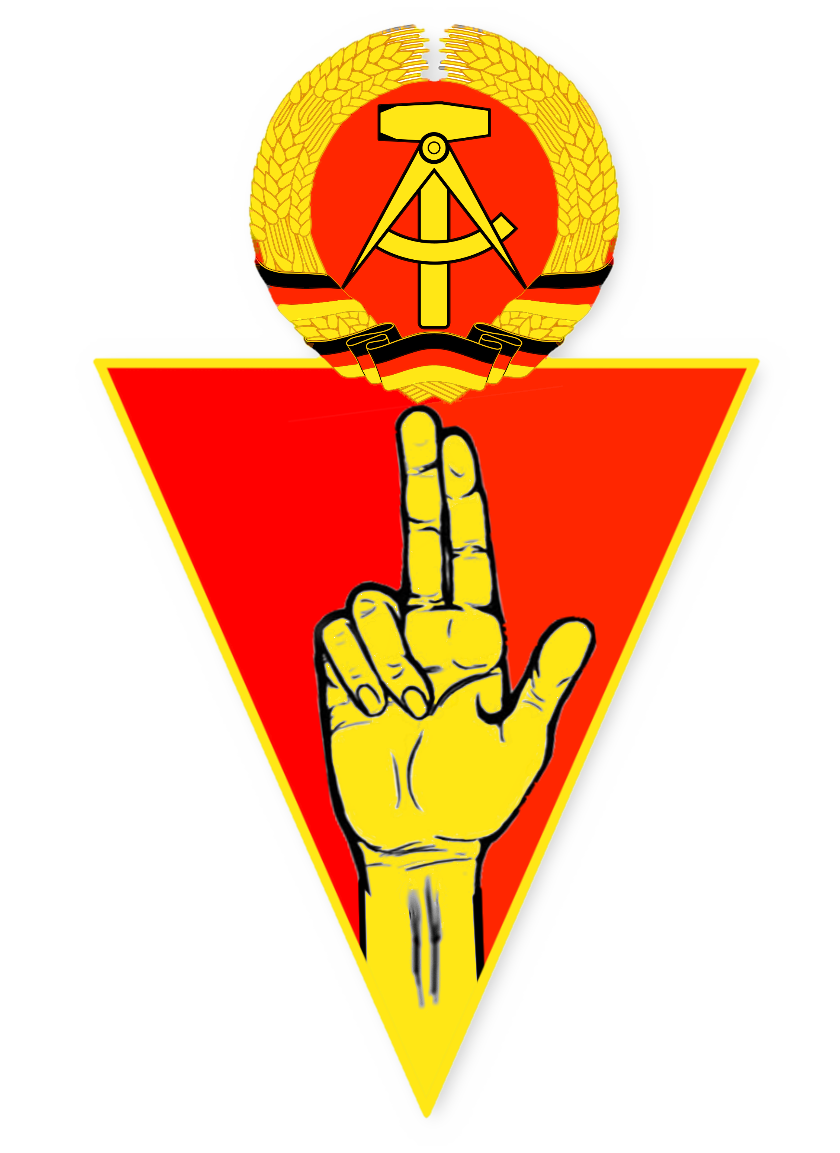
Committee of Antifascist Resistance Fighters

=== Use in East Germany (Deutsche Demokratische Republik) ===
From 1975 onwards, the Deutsche Demokratische Republik (DDR, also known as East Germany) released a medal for the "Committee of Antifascist Resistance Fighters" (KdAW, German: Komitee der Antifaschistischen Widerstandskämpfer) of the GDR that included a red triangle. The Committee of Antifascist Resistance Fighters was formed in 1953. It functioned as the East German counterpart of the Union of Persecutees of the Nazi Regime (Vereinigung der Verfolgten des Naziregimes). The KdAW enjoyed a close relationship with the Socialist Unity Party, although it was not a member of the National Front. The organisation played an important role in the commemoration of German resistance to Nazism and the Holocaust in East Germany. East Germany used such commemorative functions to emphasise its anti-fascist orientation. Membership in the KdAW made one eligible to receive the Medal for Fighters Against Fascism. The KdAW also contained a number of working groups, which brought together people with similar backgrounds. The most prominent of these were groups for survivors of various concentration camps and prisons; for example, a group existed for former prisoners of Brandenburg-Görden Prison. Another working group was formed for veterans of the International Brigades of the Spanish Civil War.

=== The red triangle on memorials ===
In addition to the Association of Persecutees of the Nazi Regime – Federation of Antifascists (VVN-BdA) memorials above, the red triangle also appears on numerous other war memorials in Europe. War memorials featuring the red triangle symbol exist in Germany and in areas of Europe that were occupied by Germany during World War Two.

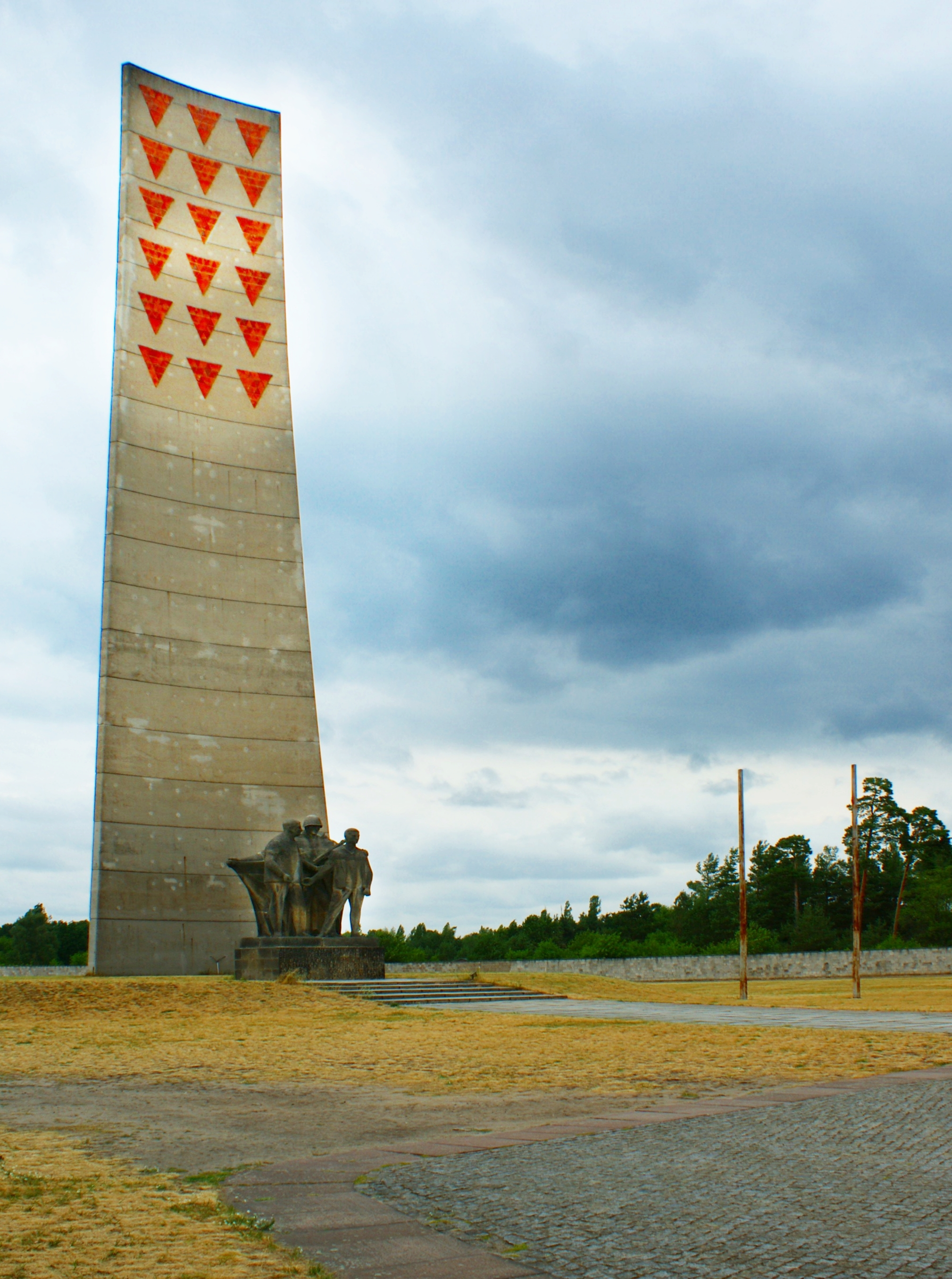
Memorial on the grounds of Sachsenhausen

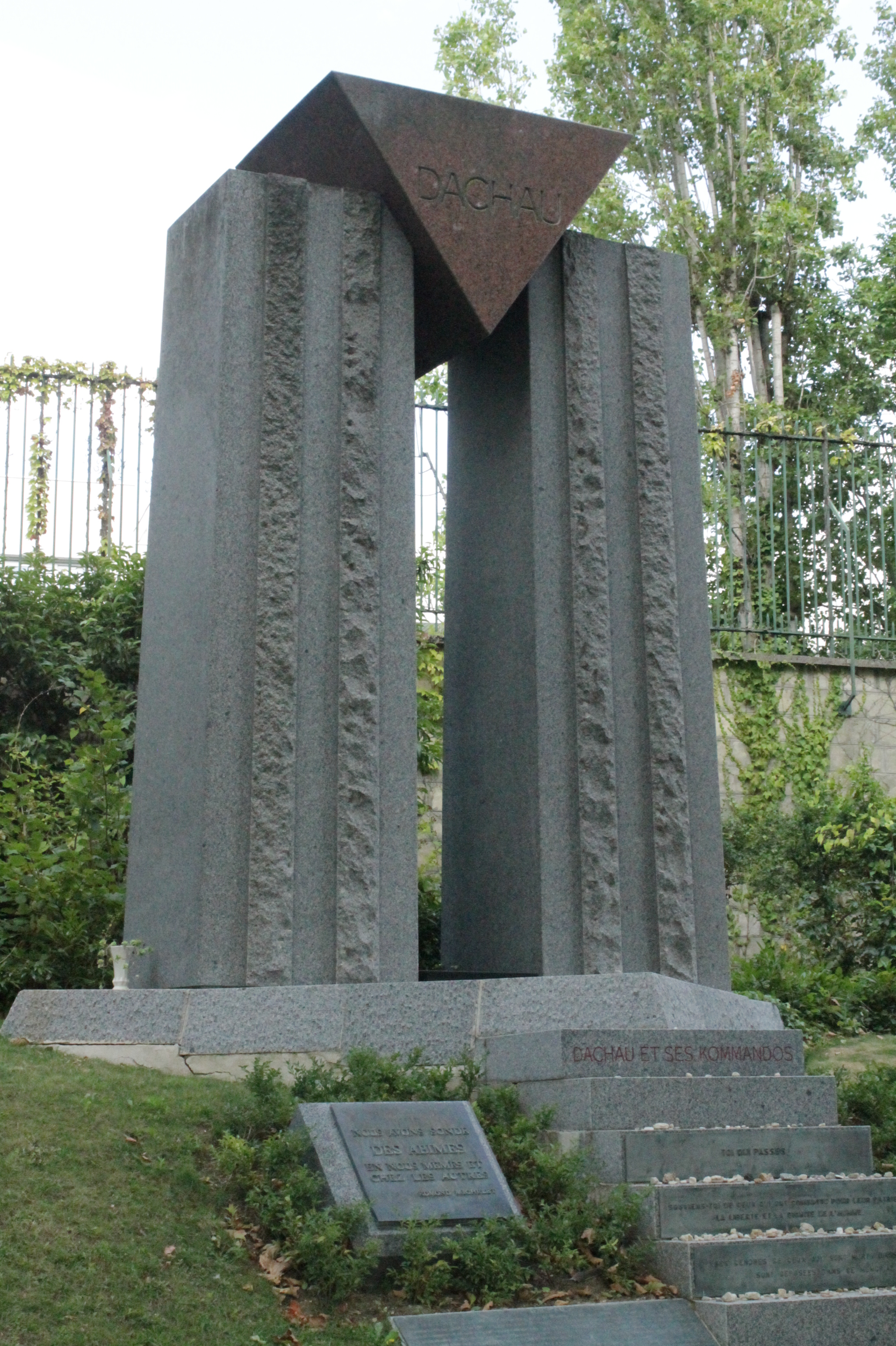
Memorial to French victims of Dachau in Paris

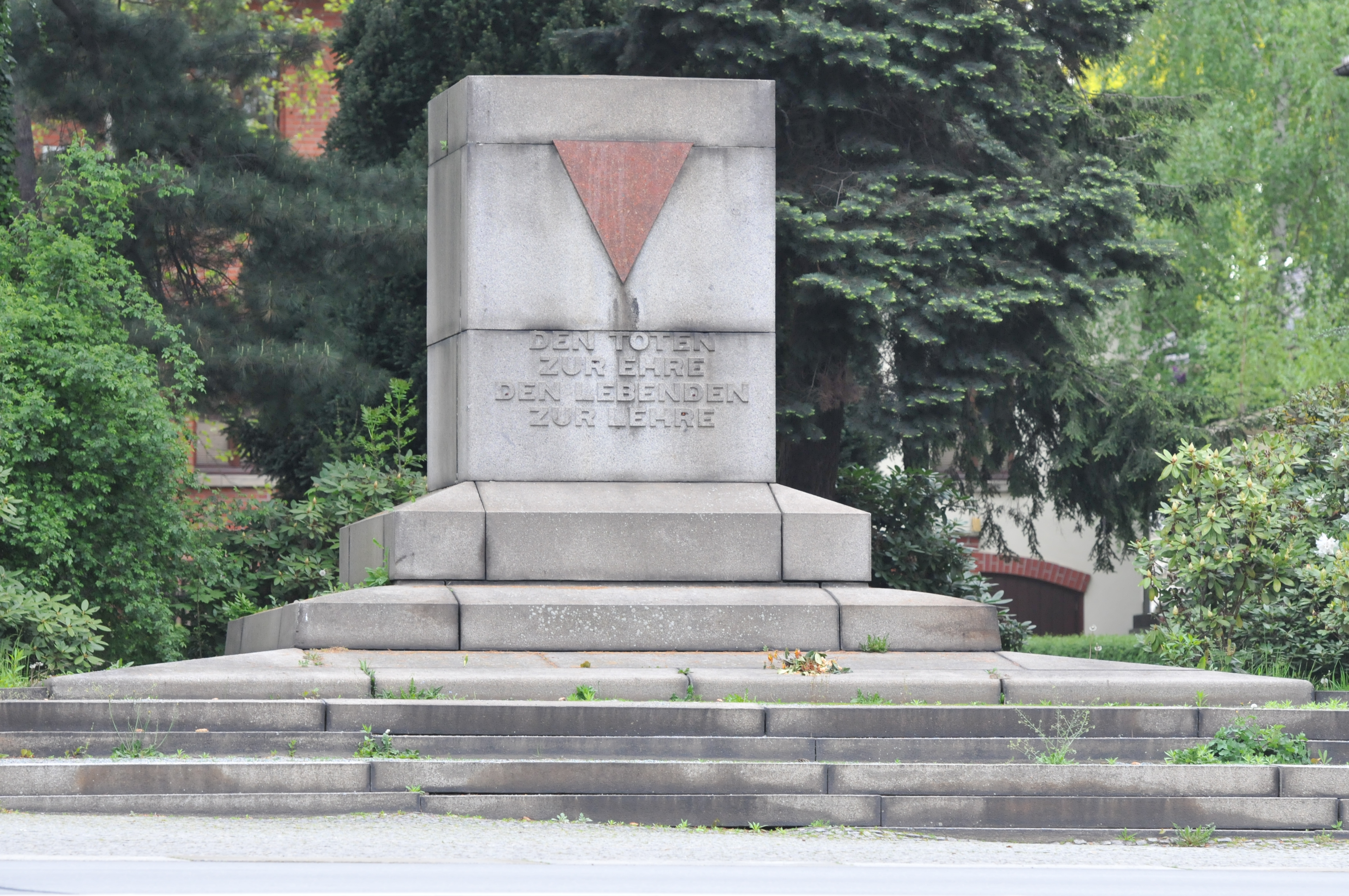
Memorial to forced labour deaths at the truck factory in Zittau, Germany

=== Service medals ===
Auschwitz Cross and Political Prisoner's Cross 1940–1945

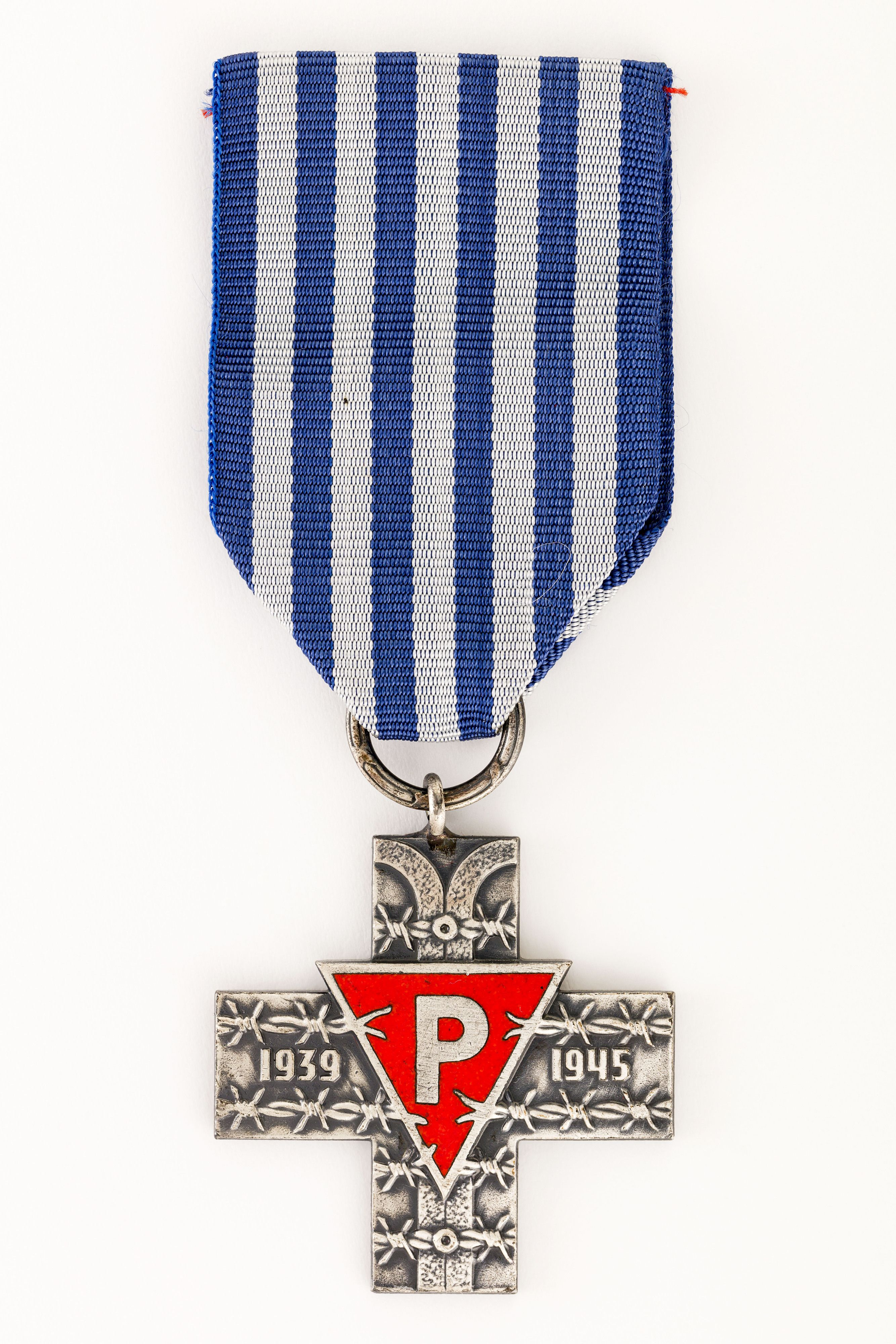
P (Polish) on the Auschwitz Cross

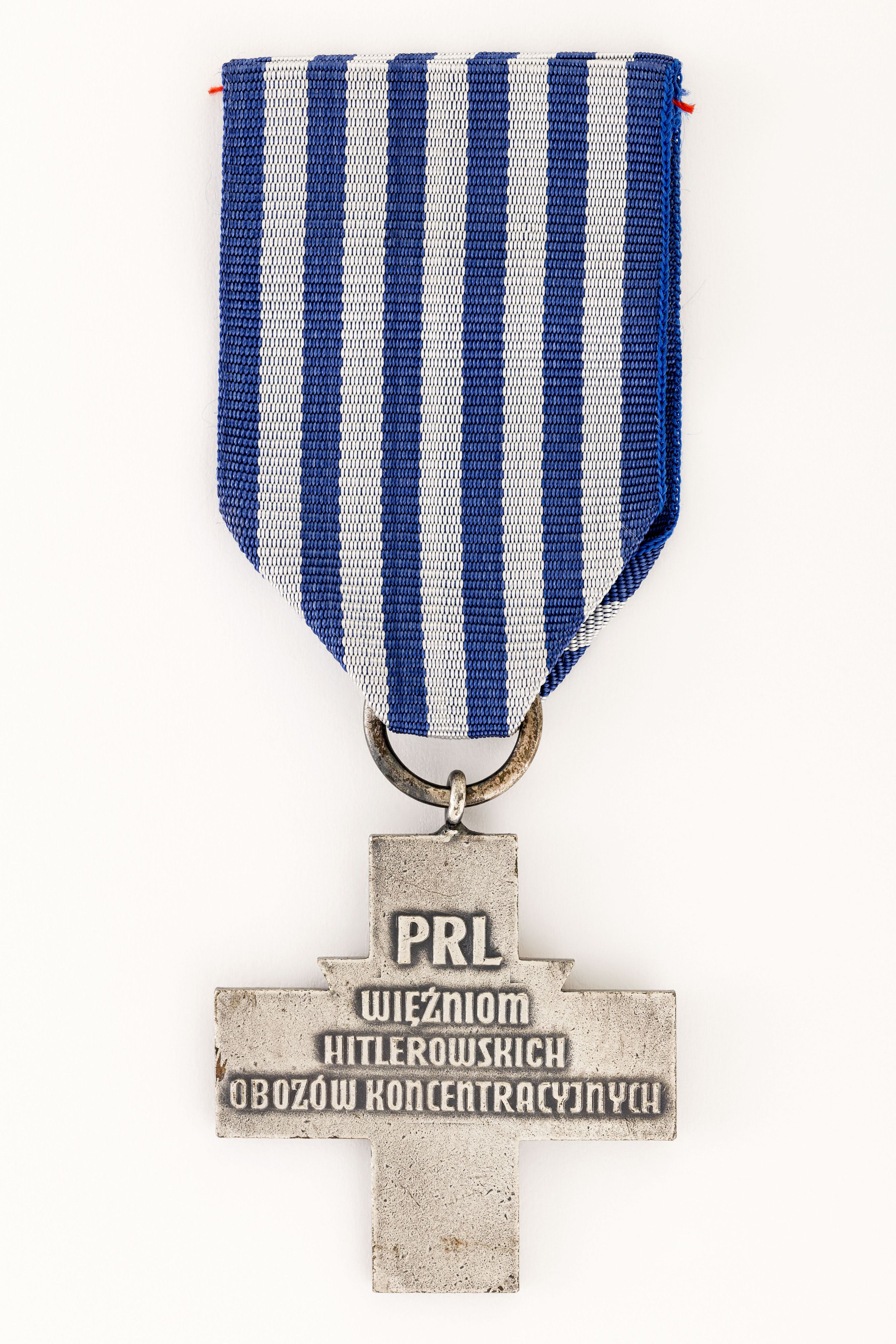
Reverse of the Auschwitz Cross

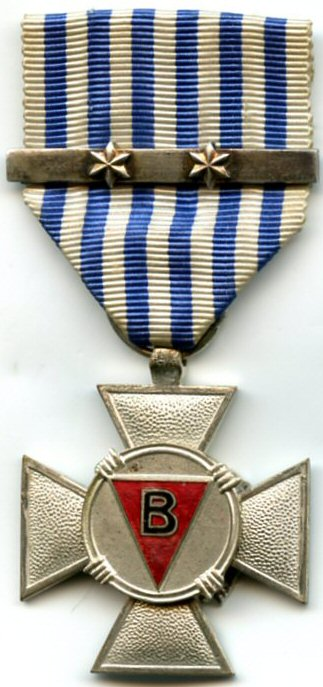

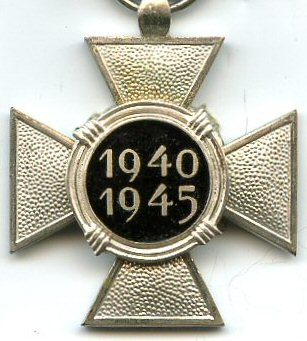
B (Belgian) on the Political Prisoner's Cross 1940–1945

Service medals awarded to prisoners of war and other camp inmates after WWII feature the triangle that was used on prisoners' uniforms. The Auschwitz Cross, a Polish medal for camp victims, and the Political Prisoner's Cross 1940–1945, a Belgian medal, both show a red triangle with a nationality indicator, and the ribbons replicate the striped fabric of some camp uniforms.

The Political Prisoner's Cross 1940–1945 (French: Croix du Prisonnier Politique 1940–1945, Dutch: Politieke Gevangenkruis 1940–1945) was a Belgian war medal established by royal decree of the Regent on 13 November 1947 and awarded to Belgian citizens arrested and interned by Germany as political prisoners during World War II. The award's statute included provisions for posthumous award should the intended recipient not survive detention, and for the right of the widow, mother or father of the deceased to wear the cross.

The Auschwitz Cross (Polish: Krzyż Oświęcimski), instituted on 14 March 1985, was a Polish decoration awarded to survivors of Nazi German concentration camps, including Auschwitz. Auschwitz is the German name for the Polish town Oświęcim, where a complex of concentration camps was built by Nazi Germany during the German occupation of Europe. The cross was generally awarded to Poles, but it could be awarded to foreigners in special cases. It could be awarded posthumously. It ceased to be awarded regularly in 1999, although Greta Ferušić was awarded it in February 2004. Some recipients of the medal were Jewish, including Szymon Kluger (Shimson Kleuger).

=== Belgium ===
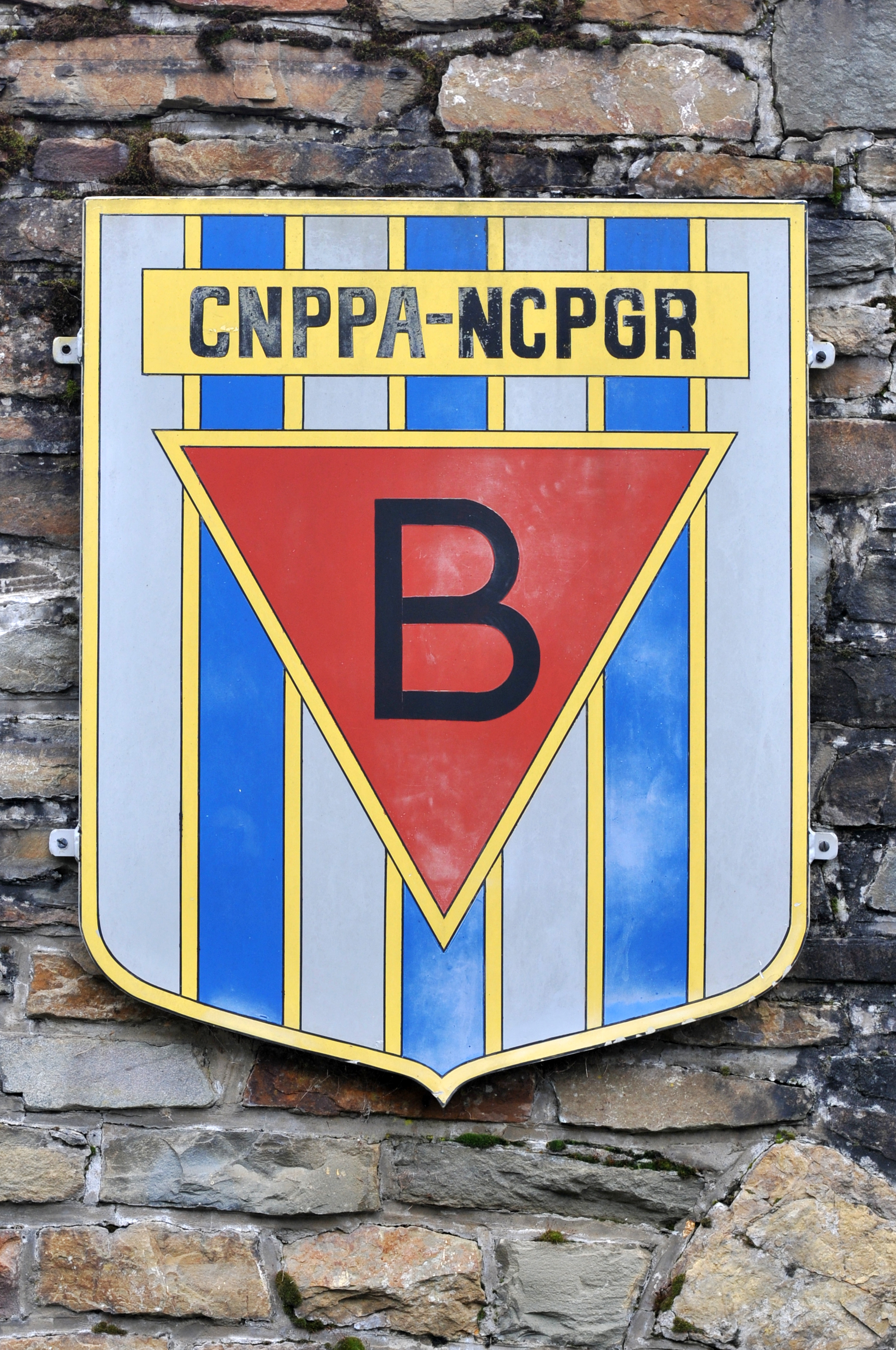
Acronym of the National Confederation of Political Prisoners and Rights Holders (C.N.P.P.A.) at the entrance to the F.N.A.P.G. cemetery in the commune of Sainte-Ode (Note: French: Sigle de la Confédération nationale des prisonniers politiques et ayant droits (C.N.P.P.A.) à l'entrée du cimetière de la F.N.A.P.G. dans la commune de Sainte-Ode)

The Belgian organisations Territoires de la Mémoire and Triangle Rouge (Red Triangle) promote the use of the red triangle as a symbol of anti-fascism and anti-racism. (Note: Note: as of 2023-06-08 their page-long French language definition of Anti-Semitism made no mention of either Israel or Zionism, see also: IHRA definition of antisemitism.)

== Recent anti-fascist and left-wing usage ==
After the war, the red triangle and pink triangle symbols were reclaimed by those who opposed the Nazis' oppression of the targeted groups. The red triangle became a symbol of resistance against the German occupation of Europe, and the pink triangle used to mark gay prisoners became a symbol of LGBTQ pride. Like the pink triangle, the red was used in some contexts broader than memorializing the victims of Nazi Germany. Some of the broader usage referenced the El Lissitzky poster.

Various anti-fascist and left-wing groups in Europe have used red triangles in reference to the reclaimed political prisoners' symbol or the Soviet red wedge. In the United Kingdom in the 1980s, Anti-Fascist Action sometimes used the symbol. They produced a badge that showed a red triangle symbol smashing a black swastika. The Red Wedge were a left-wing pop group in the UK who took their name from the Soviet poster.

=== Symbols at protests ===
Red triangle and red wedge symbols often feature at protests against far-right political movements, particularly in Germany.

The German protest group NIKA was started in response to the rise of Germany's far-right party, the AfD (German: Alternative für Deutschland, lit. 'Alternative for Germany').

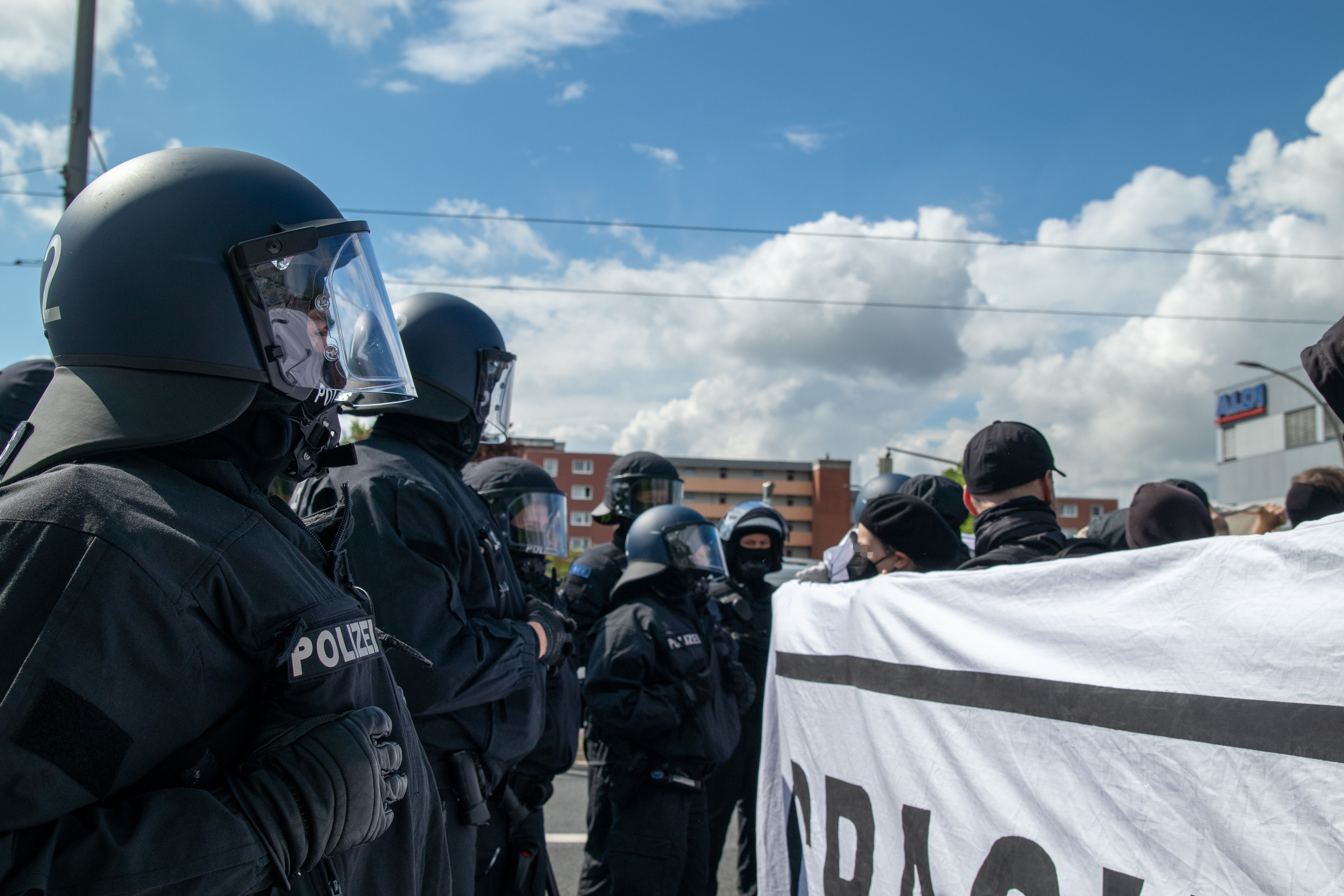
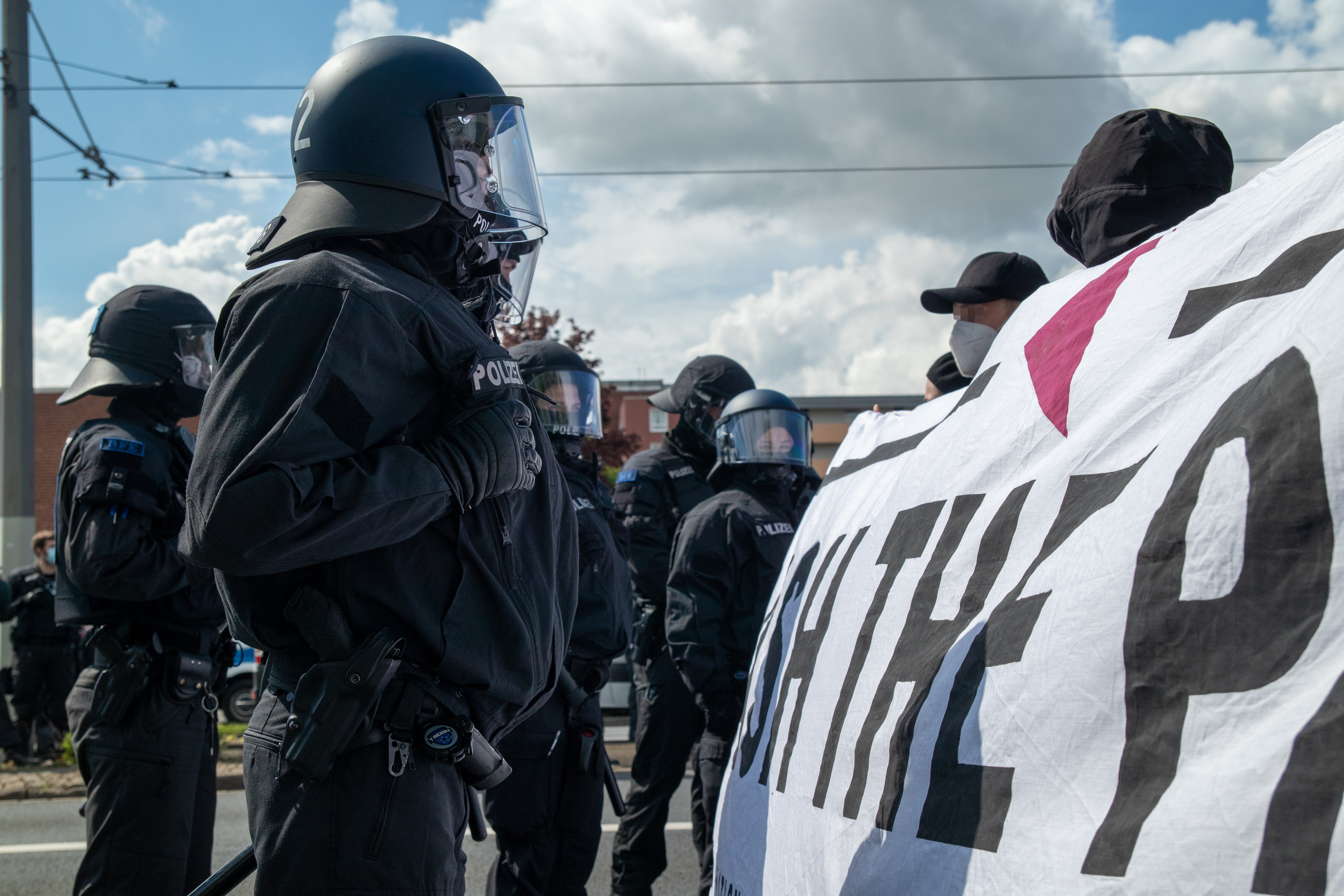
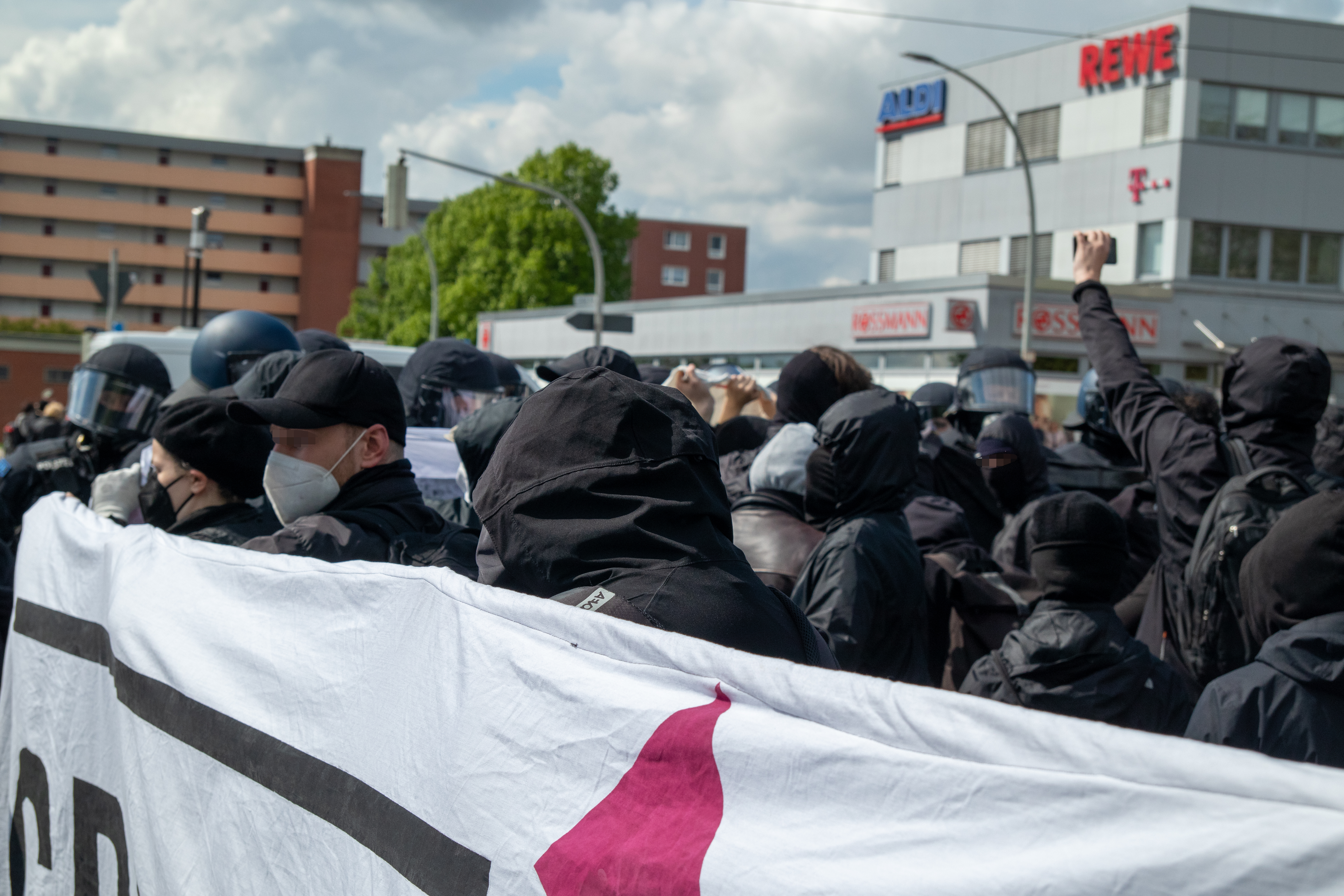
Protest against Alternative for Germany (AfD), in Braunschweig, Lower Saxony in 2021.
The same protest banner saying "crash the party" was also used by NIKA in 2017.
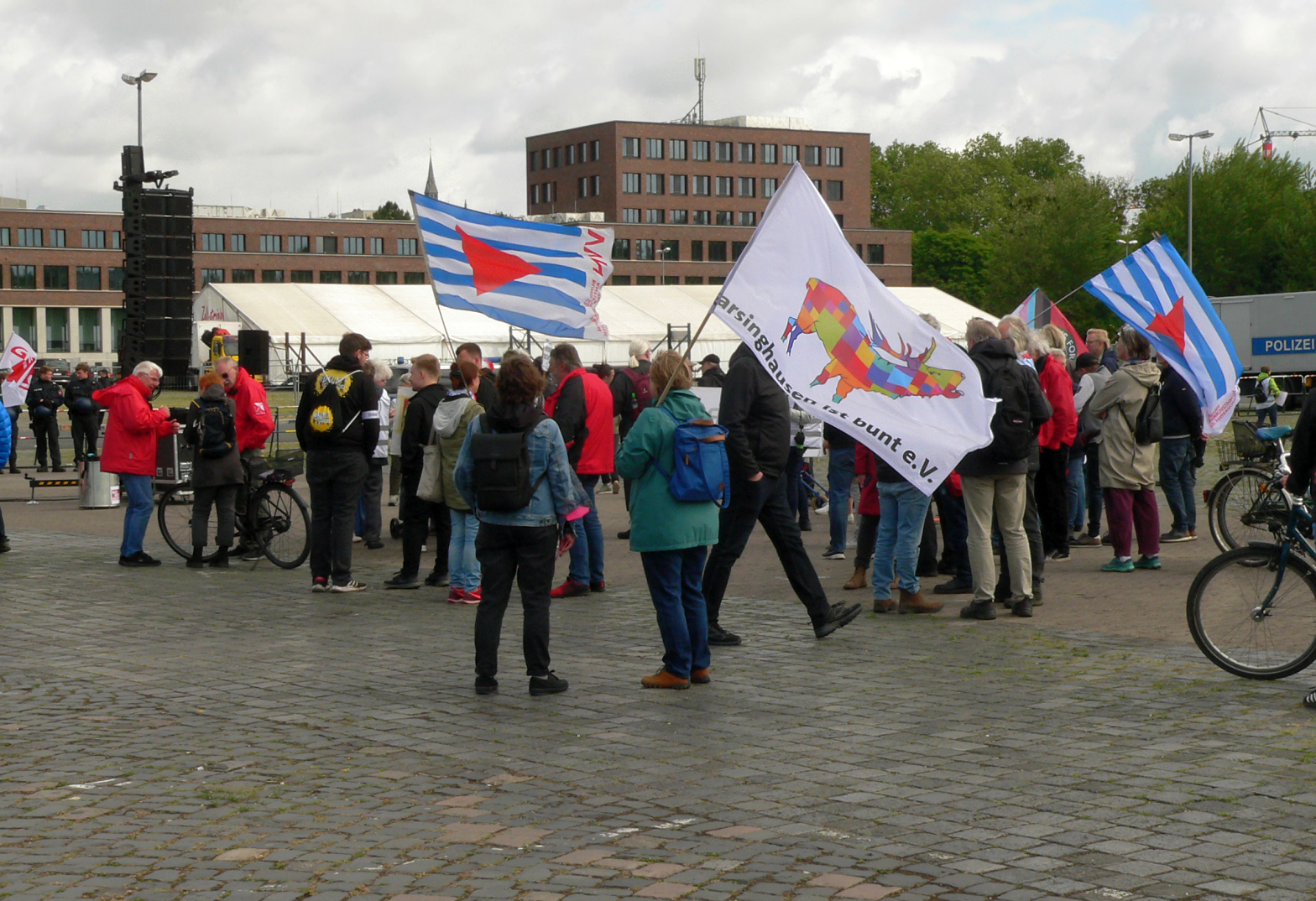
VVN-BdA flags at a protest against Alternative for Germany (AfD) in Hannover in Lower Saxony in 2022.

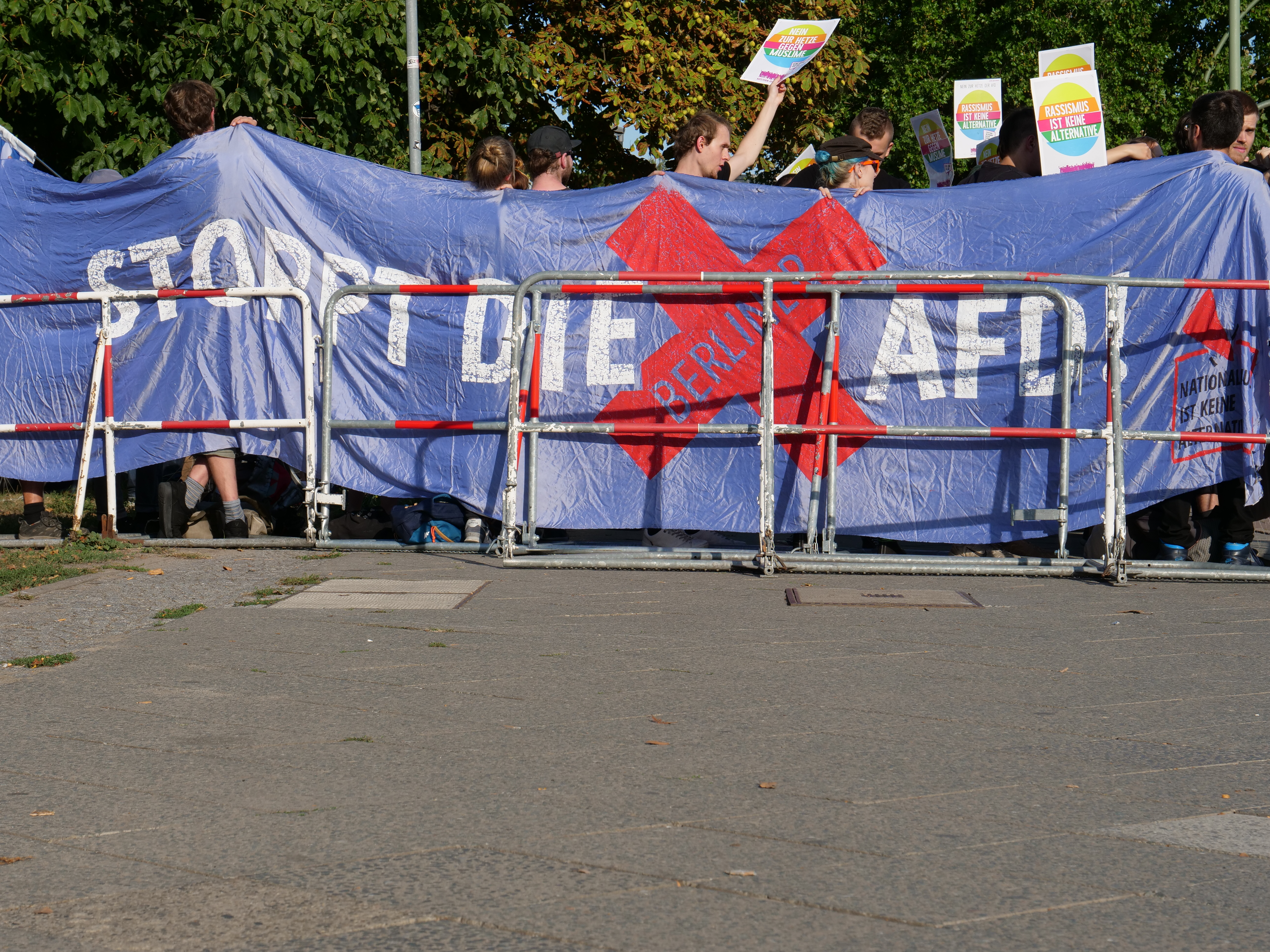
NIKA logo in the corner of a banner saying in German: Stoppt die Berliner AfD, lit. 'Stop the AfD Berlin', in Spandau in 2018 (Note: Protest against the party conference of the Berlin regional association of the AfD in 2018. The banner says: German: STOPPT DIE BERLINER AFD, lit. 'STOP THE BERLIN AFD'. See also: Media related to Protest against an AfD meeting in the Zitadelle Spandau on 04-09-2018 at Wikimedia Commons)

=== Political discourse ===
Political discussions often include comparisons to Nazi Germany or fascism more broadly. These comparisons are particularly controversial when applied to Israel. The red triangle is rising in popularity as a symbol of Palestinian resistance.

=== Red triangle lapel pins in European politics ===
Red triangle lapel pins are widely distributed in Western European countries. Red triangle pins are worn by socialist, communist, and other left-wing or far-left politicians in Belgium, Spain, and France.

Left-wing French presidential candidate Jean-Luc Mélenchon wore a red triangle lapel pin during his campaign. He aimed to differentiate himself from far-right National Front candidate Marine Le Pen.

Jean-Luc Mélenchon explained the meaning of the symbol, "I have been compared to the National Front. I was outraged. I said to myself, what could I wear? And someone, a Belgian, a comrade, said to me, 'Listen, I'll give you mine, it's the insignia of the communist deportees in the Nazi concentration camps'. And so I said: 'now I'm putting it on, I'm not taking it off' ... We forget this moment in history. But the first to be deported and massacred were the communists..."

French politician Ugo Bernalicis, from the Left Party (previously from the Socialist Party), represents the department of Nord in the French National Assembly. Bernalicis was born into a family close to the communist movement, with a militant father, an elected grandfather and a great-grandfather who was deported to the Dachau concentration camp because of his political convictions.

In 2020, red lapel pins were worn by Spanish politicians Pablo Iglesias (Second Deputy Prime Minister of Spain) and Alberto Garzón (Ministry of Consumer Affairs, from the United Left party) when they were sworn in by the King of Spain. Alberto Garzón has been wearing the symbol since 2016.

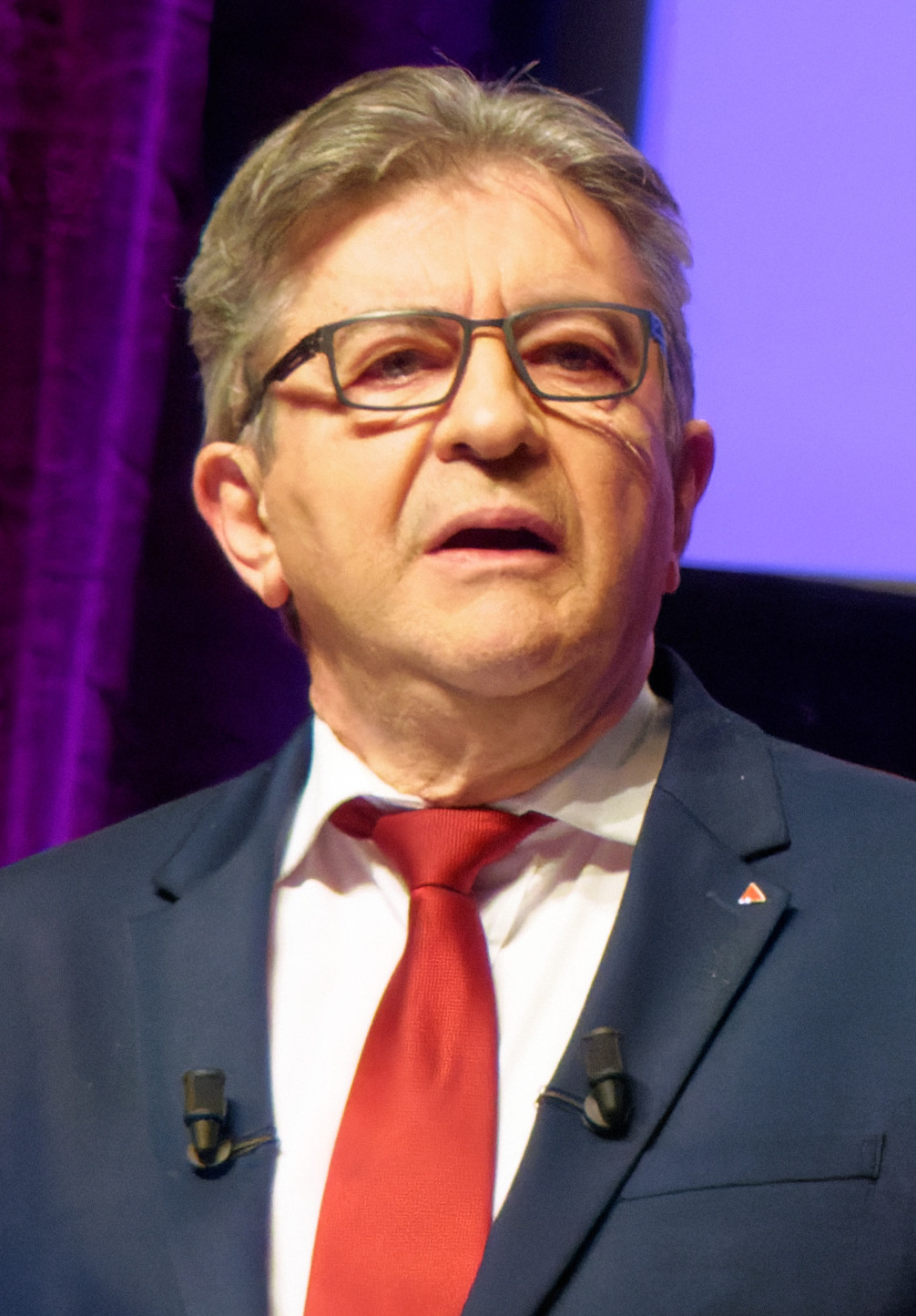
Jean-Luc Mélenchon, La France Insoumise (photo 2022)

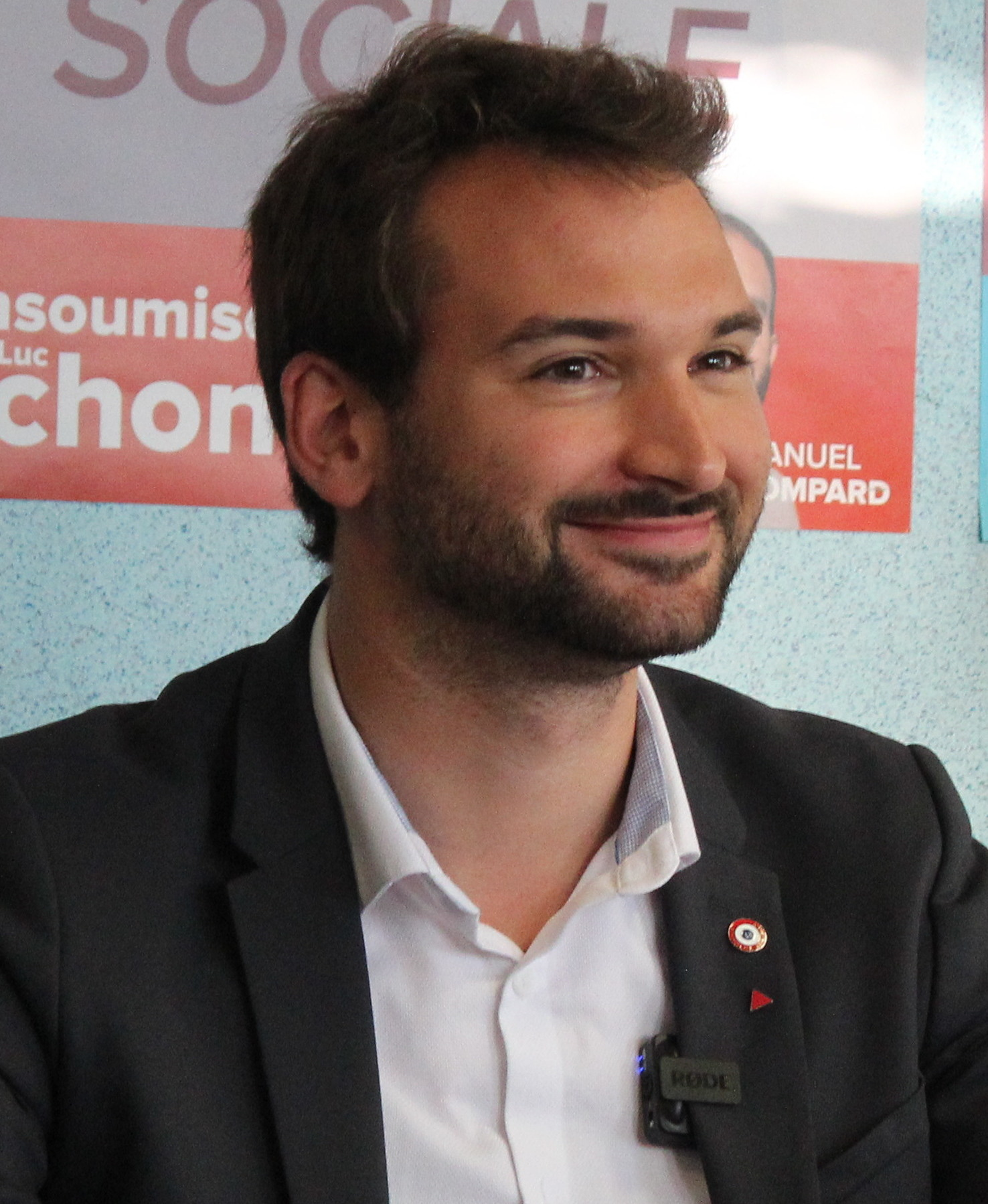
Ugo Bernalicis, Left Party, (Note: Nord, French National Assembly) French (photo 2019)

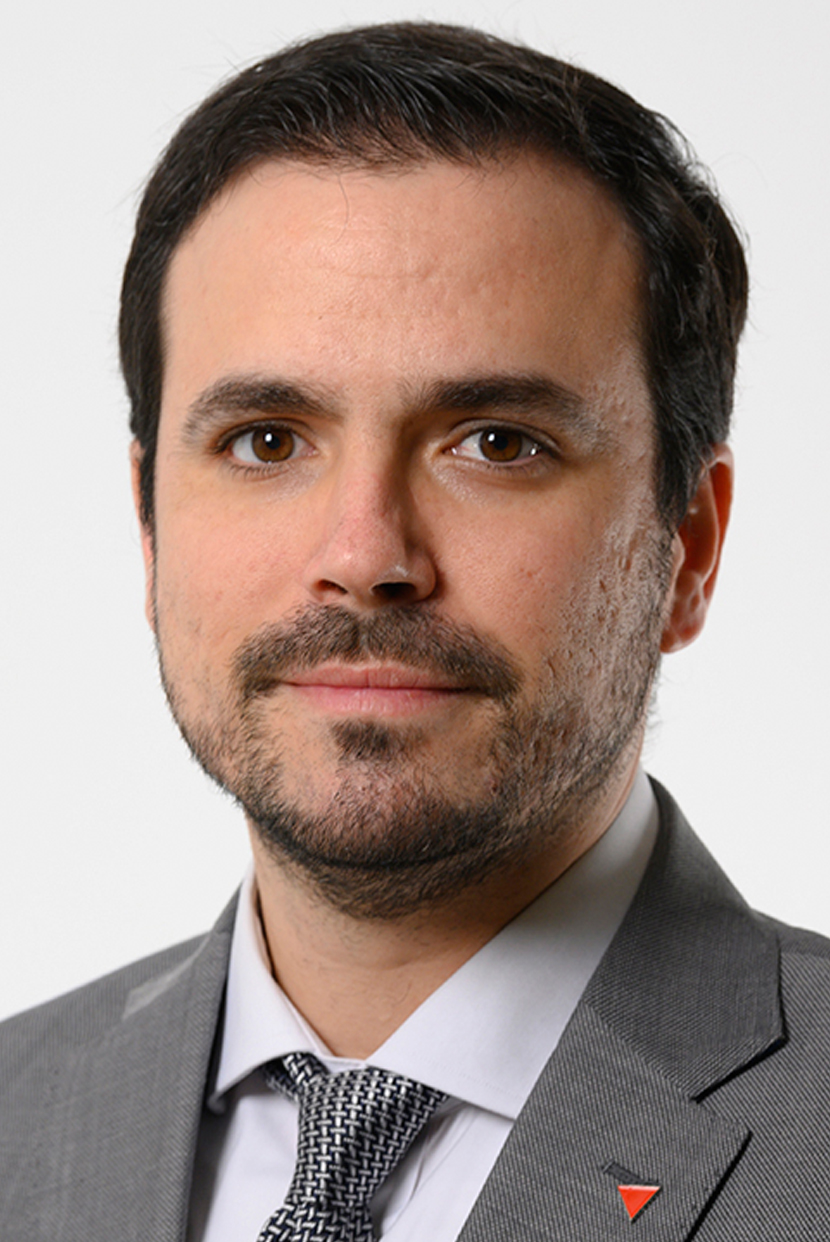
Alberto Garzón, (Note: Spain's Minister of Consumer Affairs) Communist Party of Spain (photo 2020)

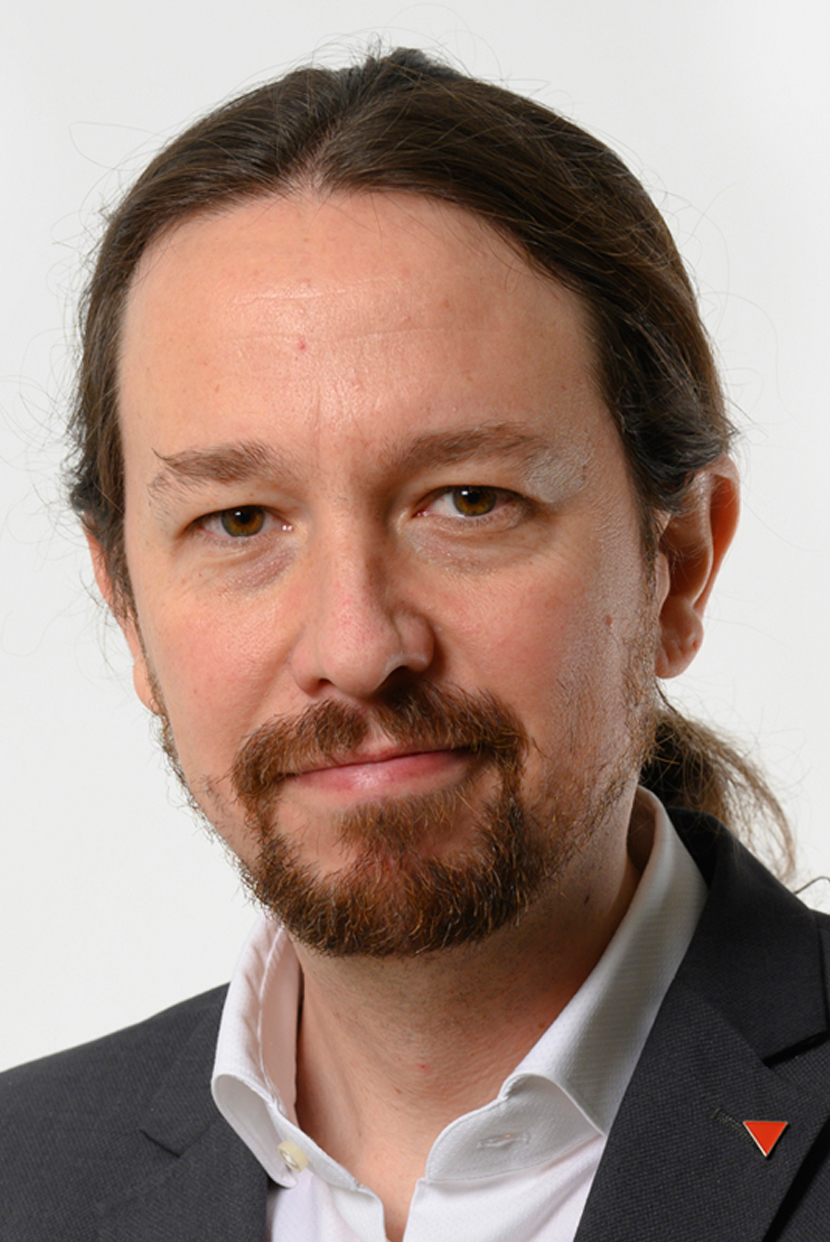
Pablo Iglesias Turrión, Podemos, Spain (photo 2020)

=== Modern persecution of leftists and criticism of the far-right ===
In 2020, Donald Trump's presidential re-election campaign attracted controversy by using the symbol in social media adversisements attacking his political opponents, whom he described as "Antifa". Facebook banned the ad on the basis of the historical use by the Nazi Party in their persecution of their political opponents. A spokesperson for the campaign claimed that the red triangle was not a hate symbol on the basis that it was not in the Anti-Defamation League (ADL) database of hate symbols. ADL's CEO, Jonathan Greenblatt, pointed out that the database only included symbols used in the United States, not historical or foreign symbols. Gigafact published a fact check with the question "Does Antifa commonly use an inverted red triangle symbol once used by Nazis?" Their answer was no, but they did state that the red triangle has been used by some European anti-fascist groups.

==== 2020 Trump campaign terrorism accusations against Antifa ====
In June 2020, Donald Trump's election campaign included an advertisement on social media saying that he would make "Antifa" a "designated terrorist" group. The advertisement showed the red triangle as an Antifa symbol.

In the same month, the campaign posted an advertisement on Facebook stating that "Dangerous MOBS of far-left groups are running through our streets and causing absolute mayhem" and identifying the groups as "ANTIFA", accompanied by a graphic of a downward-pointing red triangle. The ads appeared on the Facebook pages of Donald Trump, the Trump campaign, and Vice President Mike Pence. Many observers compared the graphic to the symbol used by the Nazis for identifying political prisoners. Observers also noted the number of ads, 88, which is a number associated with neo-Nazis and white supremacists.

Both progressive and conservative Jewish groups expressed public disapproval for Trump's use of the symbol. "Bend the Arc: Jewish Action", a progressive Jewish site, stated the campaign was using the symbol "to smear millions of protestors".

Facebook removed the campaign ads with the graphic, saying that its use in this context violated the site's policy against "organized hate". The Trump campaign's communications director wrote, "The red triangle is a common Antifa symbol used in an ad about Antifa." Historian Mark Bray, author of Antifa: The Anti-Fascist Handbook, disputed this, saying that the symbol is not associated with Antifa in the United States.

== Logos of political and activist groups ==
OCI (ОКИ)

VVN-BdA (see above)

- Anti-Fascist Action in the United Kingdom used the symbol in badges in the 80s; one example showed the pointed red shape smashing a black swastika.
- Anti-Racist Action (1988) use a red triangle in the form of a forked red slingshot.
- Association of Persecutees of the Nazi Regime – Federation of Antifascists (VVN-BdA, see above).
- The Network of Communists (RdC, Italian: Rete dei Comunisti) is a communist political movement network, founded in Bologna, Italy, on 13 September 1998.
- NIKA (German: Nationalismus ist keine Alternative, lit. 'Nationalism is not an alternative') was founded in Germany in response to the rise of Germany's far-right party, the AfD (German: Alternative für Deutschland, lit. 'Alternative for Germany').
- Organisation of Communist Internationalists (Russian: Организация Коммунистов Интернационалистов)
- Qassam Brigades (Arabic: كتئب القسام, romanized: Kataeb al-Qassam) have used an inverted red triangle (Arabic: المثلث الأحمر المقلوب) in their propaganda videos since November 2023. The inverted red triangle was later included in the logo of their Military Media division. Qassam are a religious and Palestinian nationalist group. Most media have said Qassam's symbol has different origins (see below).
- Ras l'front (RLF, English: "Fed up") use an inverted red triangle in some of their modern logos.
- Revolutionary Left (Spanish: Izquierda Revolucionaria) in Spain used a red wedge in their first logo.
- Territoires de la Mémoire (Territories of Memory) and Triangle Rouge (Red Triangle) are Belgian organisations who promote the use of the red triangle as a symbol of anti-fascism and anti-racism. (Note: Note: as of 8 June 2023 their page-long French language definition of antisemitism made no mention of either Israel or Zionism, see also: IHRA definition of antisemitism.) (See also: Avenue Louise § World War II)

ANED

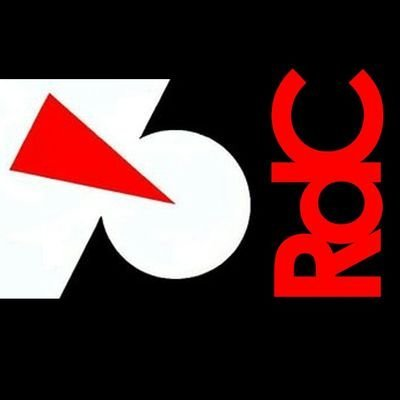
Network of Communists

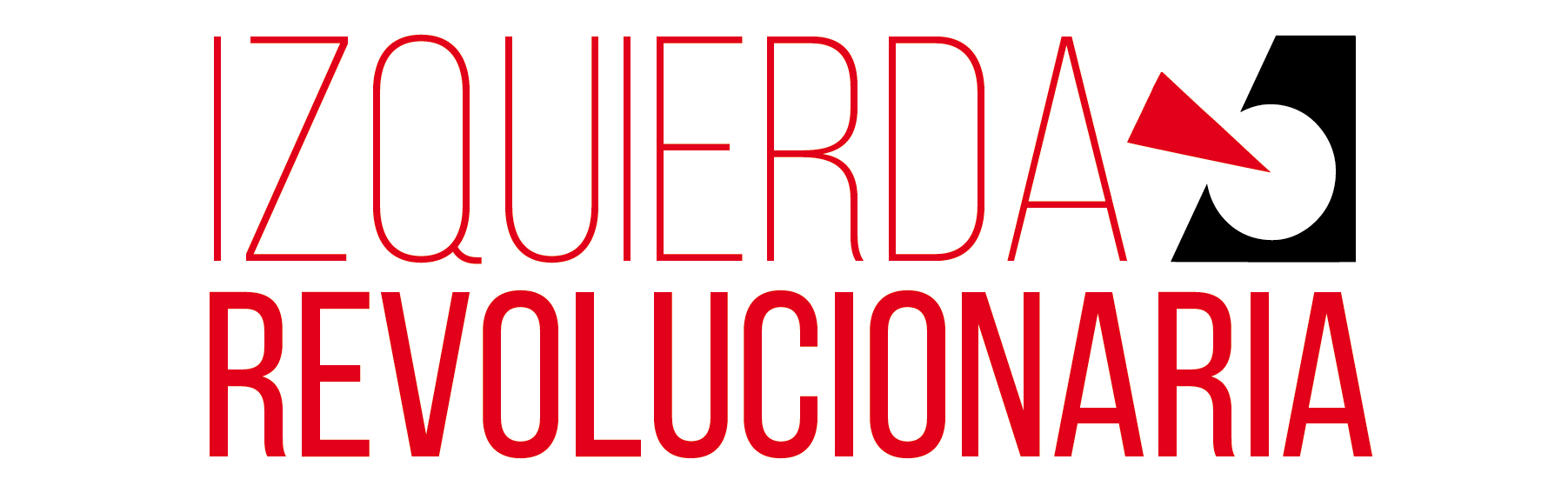
First logo of Revolutionary Left, Spain (Izquierda Revolucionaria)

Organisation of Communist Internationalists (Note: (Организация Коммунистов Интернационалистов))

== The red triangle and red wedge in arts and media ==
=== Left-wing news and non-fiction ===
- Searchlight use the red wedge in their current logo.
- Antifaschistisches Infoblatt (AIB) is an anti-fascist publication in Berlin, Germany.
- The People's History of Australia podcast uses a logo with a red wedge attacking a white map of Australia.

=== Music ===
- The name of the British band Red Wedge references Beat the Whites with the Red Wedge.
- L'affiche rouge is a song by Léo Ferré commemorating victims of the Affiche Rouge affair.

=== Visual arts ===
- The Russian artist Sergei Bugaev produced an "Anti-Lissitzky" series at the end of the Cold War, between 1991 and 1995, which included several derivative works based on Beat the Whites with the Red Wedge.
- Kunstverein Roter Keil (Red Wedge art and culture association) say their name is a coincidence.

=== Fiction ===
- A variant of the image by El Lissitzky is the logo for the "Peacekeepers" on the sci-fi TV show Farscape.

== See also ==
- Anti-fascism – Opposition to fascism
- Black triangle (badge) – Nazi concentration camp badge for "asocials"
- Brown triangle – Genocide of the Romani in Europe during World War II
- Communist Party of Germany – Political party in Germany (1919–1946/1956)
- German-occupied Europe – Aspect of World War II
- Historiography of German resistance to Nazism
- Identification in Nazi camps – Prisoners' camp identification numbers, cloth emblems, and armbands
- LGBTQ symbols § Triangle badges of Nazi Germany
- Nazi concentration camp badge § Single triangles
- P (Nazi symbol) – Sign for Polish workers during the NS-Regime in Nazi Germany
- Pink triangle – Symbol for the LGBTQIA+ community
- Protective custody (Nazi Germany) – Extra- or para-legal rounding-up of political opponents
- Red triangle (Palestinian symbol)
- Trotskyism – Variety of Marxism developed by Leon Trotsky
- Victims of Nazi Germany § Political groups
- Yellow badge § Political groups
