= Political Prisoner's Cross 1940–1945 =

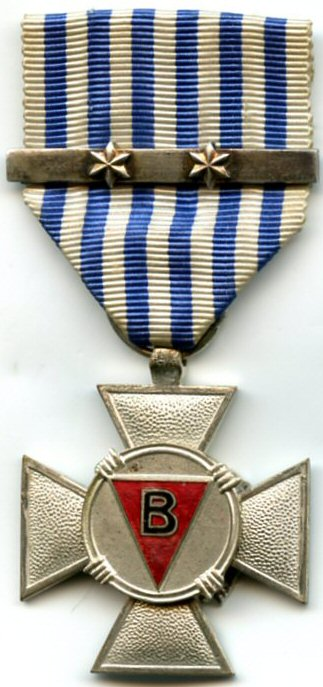
- Political Prisoner's Cross 1940–1945 (obverse)
- Type: War medal
- Awarded for: Arrest and detainment by the Germans as a political prisoner
- Presented by: Kingdom of Belgium
- Eligibility: Belgian citizens
- Status: No longer awarded
- Established: 13 November 1947
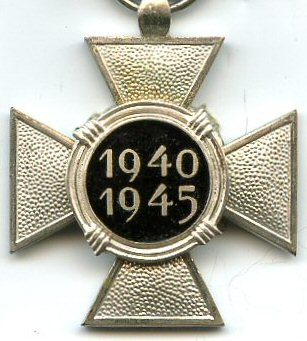
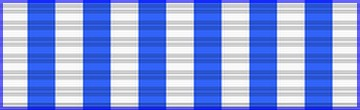
- Reverse of the medal Ribbon bar

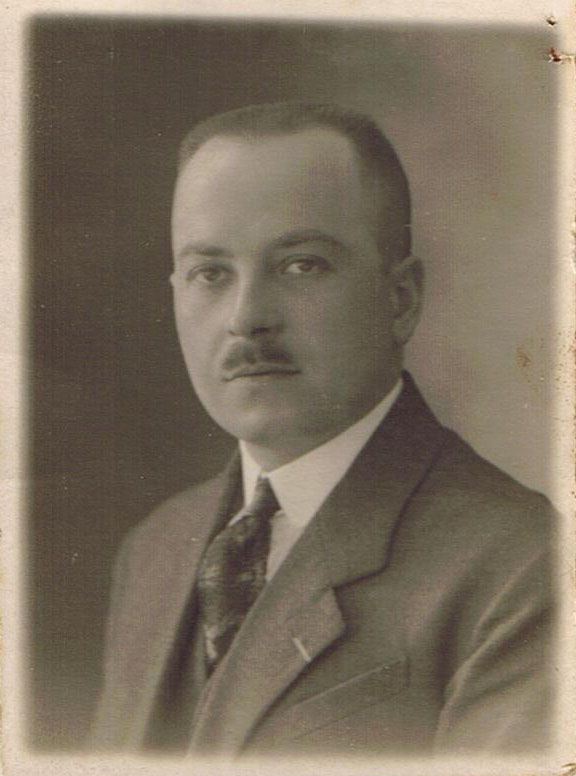
Doctor Ivan Colmant, a recipient of the Political Prisoner's Cross 1940–1945

The Political Prisoner's Cross 1940–1945 (French: Croix du Prisonnier Politique 1940–1945, Dutch: Politieke Gevangenkruis 1940–1945) was a Belgian war medal established by royal decree of the Regent on 13 November 1947 and awarded to Belgian citizens arrested and interned by the Germans as political prisoners during the Second World War. The award's statute included provisions for posthumous award should the intended recipient not survive detention, and the right of the widow, the mother or the father of the deceased to wear the cross.

== Award description ==
The Political Prisoner's Cross 1940–1945 was a 37mm wide silver cross pattée. Its obverse bore a 2 cm in diameter central medallion surrounded by barbed wire with an inverted red enamelled triangle with a black capital "B" at its center. The triangle with the "B" represents the insignia internees had to wear on their prisoners' uniforms identifying them as Belgian political prisoners. The reverse also bore a central medallion, this one though was enamelled in black bearing the years "1940 1945" in silver numerals on two rows.

The cross was suspended by a ring through a suspension loop to a 38mm wide white silk moiré ribbon with six 3mm wide longitudinal blue stripes 3mm apart from each other. These colours represented the striped prisoners' uniforms.

Silver bars with up to four small, five or six pointed stars on them could be worn on the ribbon, each star denoting a period of six months of internment. Many veterans though opted for small individual silver stars directly affixed to the ribbon. In the case of a posthumous award, a black enamelled bar was worn on the ribbon above the others.

== Notable recipients (partial list) ==
- Captain Charles de Hepcée
- Doctor Ivan Colmant
- Paul Coart
- Baron Paul of Halter
- Sir René Bauduin
- Walter Ganshof van der Meersch
- Fernand Hanssens
- Lucien Wercollier
- Josephine Van Durme
- Major General Paul Jacques
- Police Lieutenant General Oscar-Eugène Dethise
- Alfons Vranckx
- Viscount Omer Vanaudenhove
- Baron Gilbert Thibaut de Maisières
- Count Jean d’Ursel
- Count Georges Moens de Fernig
- François Ernest Samray, awarded with 7 stars

== See also ==
- Orders, decorations, and medals of Belgium

== Other sources ==
- Quinot H., 1950, Recueil illustré des décorations belges et congolaises, 4e Edition. (Hasselt)
- Cornet R., 1982, Recueil des dispositions légales et réglementaires régissant les ordres nationaux belges. 2e Ed. N.pl., (Brussels)
- Borné A.C., 1985, Distinctions honorifiques de la Belgique, 1830–1985 (Brussels)
