= Red triangle (Palestinian symbol) =

An inverted red triangle

The design of the flag of Palestine (pictured) features a red triangle.

During the Gaza war, an inverted red triangle has been used as a symbol of support for Palestine, especially since 2023. Interpretations of the triangle are varied; it is sometimes seen as a symbol of resistance, or more specifically for Palestinian armed resistance and for Hamas.

The symbol has notably been used in combat footage published by Hamas during the war that uses inverted red triangles as arrows to indicate targets, such as tanks, shortly before they are attacked or destroyed. Some have suggested the symbol originates from the red triangle seen on the flag of Palestine. However, the historical significance of the symbol is not entirely clear. The symbol has appeared at protests against the Gaza war and in graffiti in support of Palestine around the world. It has also been used in incidents of vandalism against individuals or establishments. In 2024, it was banned in the state of Berlin and removed from some social media posts by Meta Platforms.

== History ==
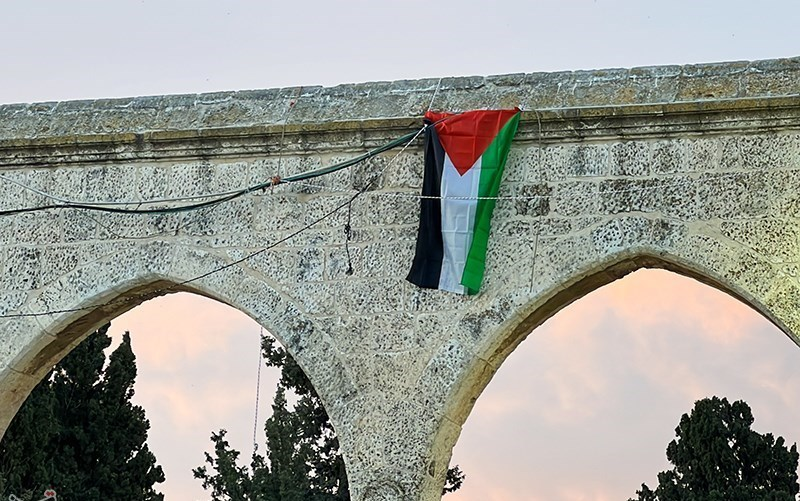
The Palestinian flag hanging on Al-Aqsa Mosque. When the Palestinian flag is hung vertically, the red triangle points downward.

The flag of Palestine contains a red triangle, along with white, green and black stripes, and this flag was endorsed by the Palestinian Liberation Organization in 1964. The red triangle on the Palestinian flag, when horizontal, is not inverted; however, when the flag is hung vertically (eg. from windows or from shoulders), the red triangle does point downward.

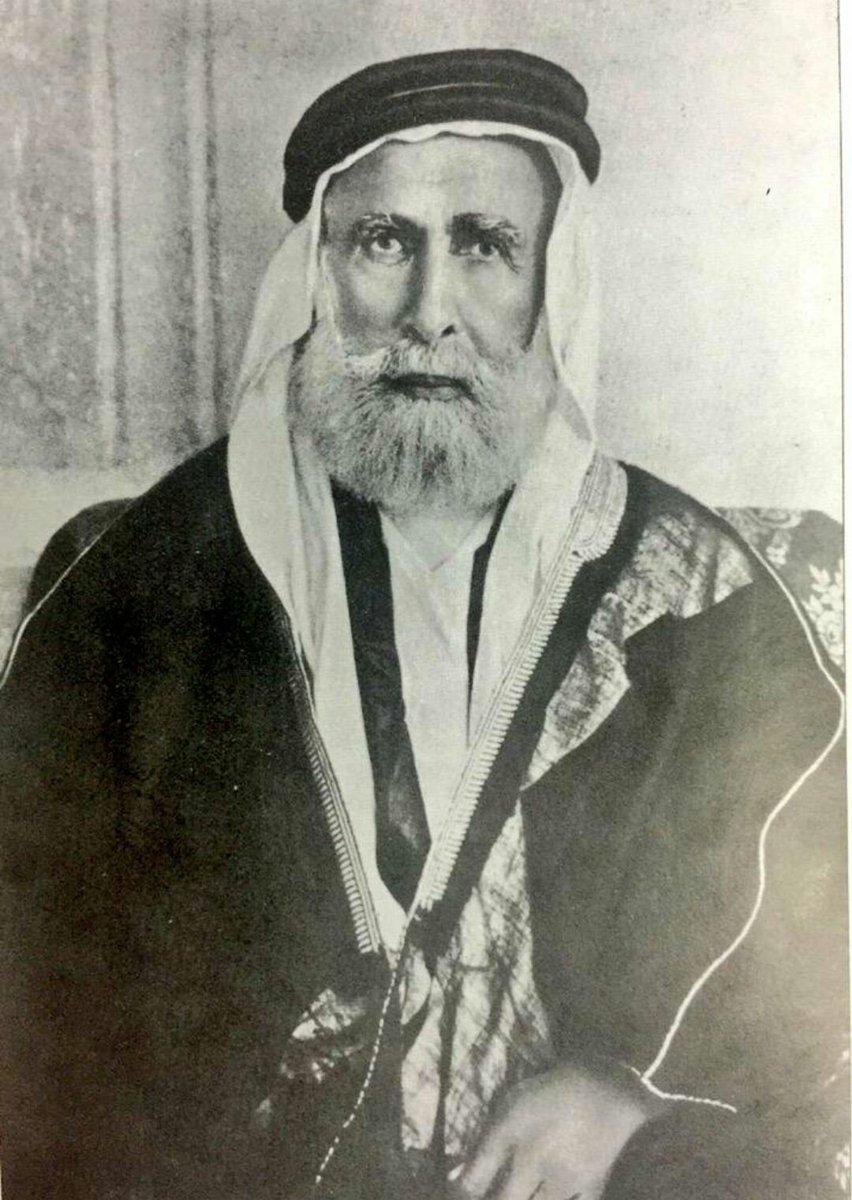
Most stories on the origin of the red triangle credit Sharif Husayn (pictured) for adding it to the 1916 Flag of the Arab Revolt.

The origins of the flag go back to the Arab Revolt of 1916. On its first anniversary, Sharif Hussein ordered the adoption of a new flag, though it was probably in use earlier. This flag contained a red triangle, which is usually said to have stood for the Hashemite dynasty. According to a 1923 biography of Mark Sykes, the red triangle represented the Mudar tribal chieftaincy, which included the family of the Prophet Muhammad, from whom the Hashemites claimed their lineage. According to one story (of unknown veracity), the red triangle came about during a meeting between Sharif Hussein and the Arab poet Fu'ad al-Khatib. Al-Khatib recalled his nationalist friends in Beirut had suggested an amalgamation of the banners of the great Arab dynasties: white for the Umayyads, black for the Abbasids and green for the Fatimids. Sharif Hussein agreed, but insisted on including the banner of the Quraysh too, which was based on the crimson of the 'unnab fruit. Thus, according to the story, the Arab flag came to include a red triangle. Other sources also say that while the Arab flag existed prior to World War I, it was Sharif Hussein who added the red triangle, or that it was suggested to him by Sykes and he accepted it, but changed the color of the triangle from dark red to scarlet. When Mandatory Iraq broke away from the Ottoman Empire, it also initially adopted the red triangle in its flag, considering red to be a traditional Islamic color. But it later changed the shape of the red triangle, and added two seven-pointed stars to it.

Some experts, including historian Costanza Musu, and some media, including Deutsche Welle, i24NEWS, The Telegraph, and Commentary, have alternatively linked the triangle to Nazi concentration camp badges, where political prisoners were identified with a red triangle, the reason also given by La France Insoumise's Jean-Luc Mélenchon to explain his use of the symbol since 2011. LFI also said that their use, like that by other left-wing groups, ultimately goes back to the symbol's use in the 19th century US by the trade union struggle to reduce the working day.

== Use since 2023 ==
Contemporary use of the symbol originates from combat footage published by Al-Qassam Brigades (the military wing of Hamas) during the Gaza war, which began on 7 October 2023, that uses inverted red triangles as arrows to indicate targets, such as tanks operated by the Israel Defense Forces (IDF), shortly before they are attacked or destroyed. These videos first appeared by November 2023. In them, according to Middle East Monitor, the destruction of military targets denoted by the red triangle is often followed by chants like "God is great" and "Palestine will be free". In the early months of the Gaza war, some social media users connected the shape with other symbols of Palestinian resistance, such as a headscarf or slingshot. Palestinian journalist Ramzy Baroud wrote that its connotation as a symbol of resistance (including its resemblance to the triangle on the Palestinian flag) may have been intentional when it was first created or that the design may have simply been a functional choice by "a young Palestinian tech-savvy fighter".

Since its establishment as a symbol of Palestinian resistance, depictions of the red triangle have appeared at Gaza war protests and been incorporated in graffiti in support of Palestine in countries around the world, including Australia, Bahrain, Canada, Germany, Lebanon, and the United States. It has also appeared as graffiti in Hebron in the West Bank. In December 2025, it was displayed on a banner in Palestine Square, Tehran, Iran, alongside an image of former Hamas spokesperson Abu Obeida, with the words "Juden-Nazis spill blood, the fire grows, and the phoenix returns" in Hebrew and Persian. The Cyber Isnaad Front, an anti-Israel hacker group identified as possibly Iranian-backed by the conservative pro-Israel think tank Foundation for Defense of Democracies, uses a modified version of the triangle when posting about its alleged victims.

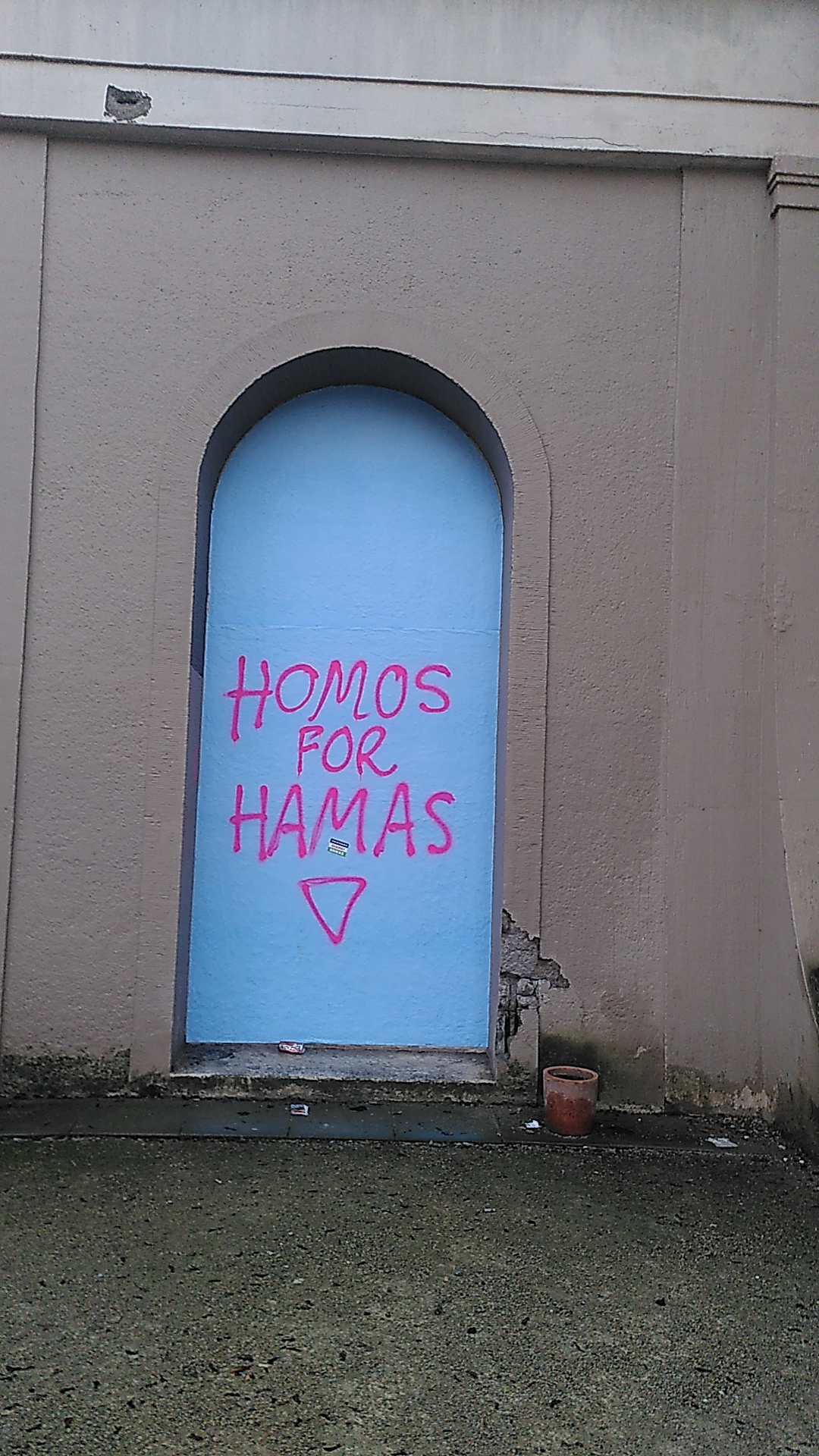
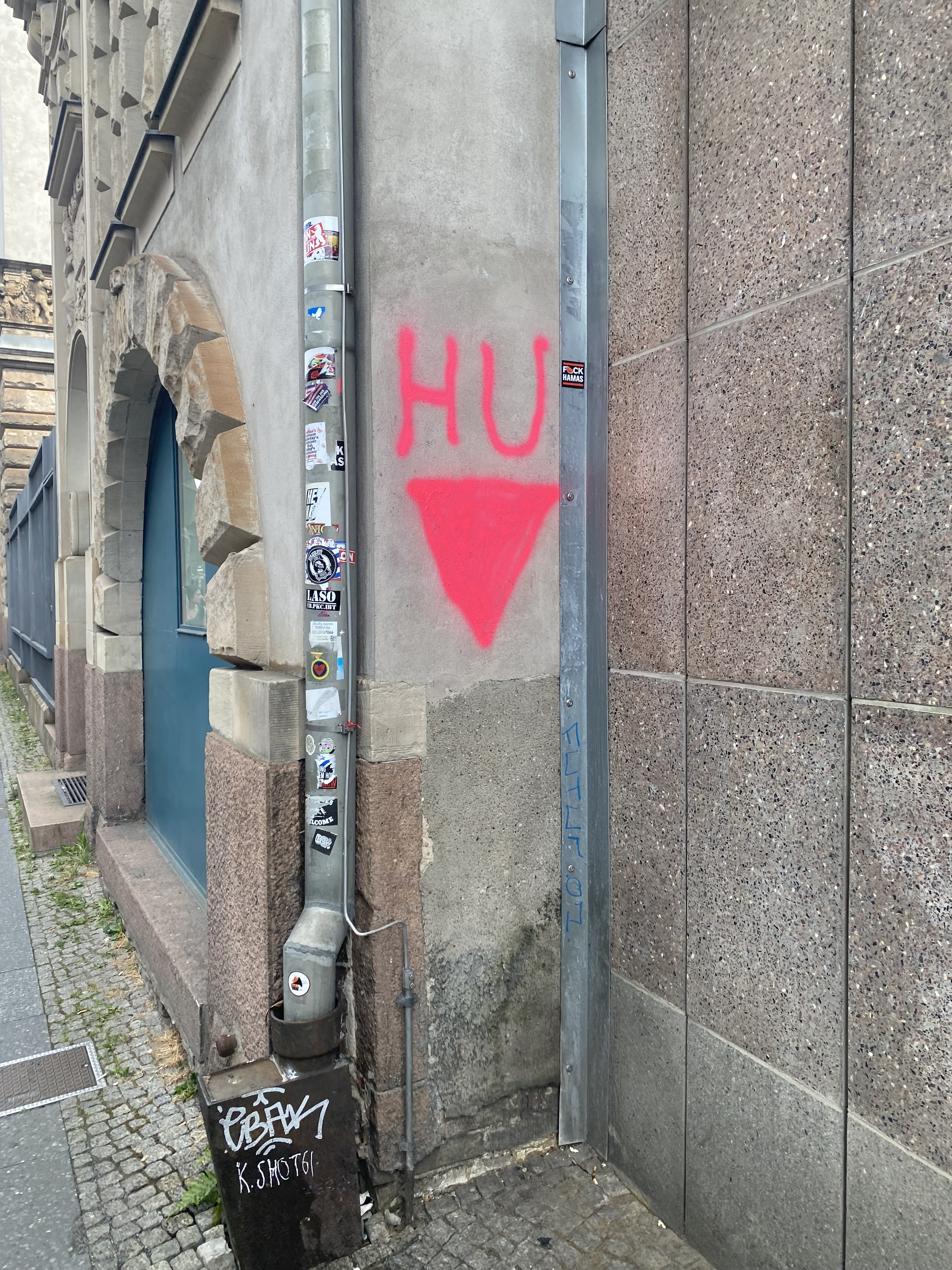
Two instances of the red triangle used in graffiti, both in Berlin

The symbol has sometimes been used to target private individuals or establishments. In the summer of 2024, in New York, United States, it was spray-painted on the residences of board members of the Brooklyn Museum, as well as that of its director Anne Pasternak; and that of Columbia University's chief operating officer, Cas Holloway. Messages left by the vandals at the residences of Pasternak and Holloway specifically targeted them for allegedly being a "white supremacist Zionist" and contributing to the suppression of protests at Columbia University, respectively. Pasternak is Jewish, and several New York political figures described the incidents as antisemitic. Also that summer, the triangle was spray-painted on the Pittsburgh synagogue Chabad of Squirrel Hill, near the Tree of Life – Or L'Simcha Congregation where a white supremacist attack took place in 2018. In October of that year, on Yom Kippur, a Jewish-owned bakery in Surry Hills, Sydney, Australia, was spray-painted with a red triangle and the word "Beware". A note reading "Be careful" was slid under the door. In January 2026, the home of Andreas Büttner, a commissioner against antisemitism in the state of Brandenburg, Germany, was the target of an arson attack, whose perpetrators also spray-painted the symbol. This represented the second attack against Büttner in 16 months — his car had previously been vandalized with swastikas.

In 2024, some social media users accused French politician Manuel Bompard of supporting Hamas after he appeared in a televised debate wearing an inverted red triangle pin. An investigation by France 24 instead connected the symbol to the Nazi concentration camp badge for political dissidents, the significance of which is explained by Bompard's party, La France Insoumise, on their website. Furthermore, an image was found of Bompard wearing a similar pin before the start of the Gaza war.

Experts say that symbols can be interpreted in different ways and that their meanings and significance can vary, and that the symbol means different things to different people. Baroud has described the red triangle as a symbol of resistance and the need for action on a global scale. He likened it to a visual indicator guiding the world's attention to the Palestinian struggle. Similarly, Musu said it's used “generally speaking to symbolize resistance.” However, “it's a lot harder to say that it wasn't intended as a way of identifying a target”, Musu continued, "when it’s painted on a Jewish person’s house, far from a college protest where students are using a variety of symbols."

=== Use by Israel ===
Avichay Adraee, then-head of the Arab media division of the IDF Spokesperson's Unit, uploaded a video during the first month of Israel's invasion of the Gaza Strip that used the red triangle to indicate Palestinian targets before their destruction. The video ends with the message in Arabic "Our triangle is stronger than yours, Abu Obeida". This prompted criticism from pro-Palestine social media users. Another video published by Adraee in December 2023 used a blue triangle, along with the Star of David and blue circles. He declared that the IDF would continue to "dismantle Hamas and attack its ISIS members".

=== Bans ===
The German Ministry of the Interior has classified the red triangle as a prohibited symbol of Hamas. Niklas Schrader, a member of Die Linke, cautioned that banning the symbol could unintentionally lead to the outlawing of other organizations. The Association of Persecutees of the Nazi Regime displays the triangle on their flag accompanied by prisoner stripes, a design that has been seen at pro-Israel demonstrations.

A red triangle emoji (U+1F53B 🔻 DOWN-POINTING RED TRIANGLE) has been widely used by supporters of Palestine on social media. In October 2024, it was reported that Meta had decided to begin removing posts that used the symbol in the context of the Israeli–Palestinian conflict, according to internal guidelines obtained by The Intercept. The policy stated that it would only be enforced on posts flagged by the moderation system, which would lead to the deletion of material containing the triangle followed by possible further disciplinary action. Multiple experts interviewed by The Intercept expressed concern that the ban could limit free speech, including by inadvertently blocking the usage of the triangle in contexts other than supporting Hamas. Meta did not respond to requests for comment by journalists.

== See also ==
- Pink triangle
- Watermelon (Palestinian symbol)
