= Mike Flanagan (Irish-Israeli soldier) =

Irish soldier who assisted the formation of the Israeli armed forces

- מייק פלנגן
- Born: 15 May 1926; Foxford, County Mayo, Ireland
- Died: 26 January 2014 (aged 87); Toronto, Canada
- Spouse(s): Ruth Levy, Shirley Swartz
- Military career
- Allegiance: United Kingdom; Israel
- Branch: British Army; Israel Defense Forces
- Unit: Israeli Armored Corps
- Conflicts: World War II; Western Front; Palestine Emergency; 1948 Arab–Israeli War; Operation Yoav

Mike Flanagan (Hebrew: מייק פלנגן; 15 May 1926 – 26 January 2014) was an Irish soldier in the British Army who assisted the formation of the Israeli armed forces. He is considered one of the most famous deserters from the British Army in Palestine.

Flanagan was born in Foxford, County Mayo Ireland. Flanagan enlisted in the British Army at age 16 and saw action in World War II. He participated in the invasion of Normandy and his unit took part in the liberation of the Nazi-operated Bergen-Belsen concentration camp. He later served with the British occupation force in Berlin and was stationed in India and Syria before being deployed to Mandatory Palestine.

At the end of the British Mandate in 1948, Flanagan had served three years in Palestine. He was part of the British garrison in Haifa that remained following the end of the Mandate to help evacuate the British Army's remaining heavy equipment. During this time, Flanagan and his Scottish tank commander Harry McDonald, frequented a cafe in Haifa and discussed the possibility of emigrating to one of the British dominions, as they were unsatisfied with their prospects in Britain. They came into contact with a Haganah agent at the cafe, selling him a truckload of jerrycans they had been instructed to destroy to prevent them from falling into the hands of either side.

After establishing contact with the Haganah, Flanagan and McDonald were persuaded to take part in a mission to steal tanks from the retreating British garrison for the fledgling Israel Defense Forces. Both of them were sympathetic to the emerging State of Israel and had been promised that they would be paid and allowed to start a new life in Israel if they wished. On 29 June 1948, Flanagan and McDonald stole two British Cromwell tanks and drove them to Israeli forces in Tel Aviv. These became central to the Israeli Armored Corps. The tanks were hidden in Giv'atayim. The Cromwell tanks are currently on display at the Armored Corps Memorial Site and Museum in Latrun. Flanagan saw action in the 1948 Arab-Israeli War as a tank driver in the Armored Corps and was wounded in Operation Yoav during the attack on Iraq al-Manshiyya.

Flanagan subsequently settled in Israel, converted to Judaism, adopted the Hebrew name Michael Peleg and married Ruth Levy, a fellow soldier whom he had met on active service. The two married in a Tel Aviv cafe and Harry McDonald was his best man. The couple had two children, Dani and Karin. He briefly worked as a mechanic for the Dan Bus Company before he and his wife settled on kibbutz Sha'ar HaAmakim, where he worked in the garage and the fields. Flanagan served as a reservist in the 1956 Sinai Campaign, the 1967 Six-Day War, as well as the Yom Kippur War in 1973. He supervised the tank repair unit at the Armored Corps base in Julis throughout this time. He also studied agronomy at the Hebrew University's Faculty of Agriculture in Rehovot and was sent to Africa as an Israeli agricultural emissary for a number of years.

After his retirement from the Israel Defense Forces and the death of his wife, he visited Ireland and Canada. While in Toronto, he met Shirley Swartz, the widow of a Canadian volunteer in the Israeli military in 1948 with whom he had served. He subsequently married her and emigrated to Canada, where he lived for the rest of his life. He died on 26 January 2014 and was subsequently buried in Sha’ar HaAmakim cemetery alongside his wife and son.

Flanagan was posthumously awarded the Medal of Valor from the Wiesenthal Center in the United States. The Israeli Defense Forces honored Flanagan for his immense and critical contributions to its formulation.

== See also ==
- Tanks in the Israeli Army
