= Tanks of the Israel Defense Forces =

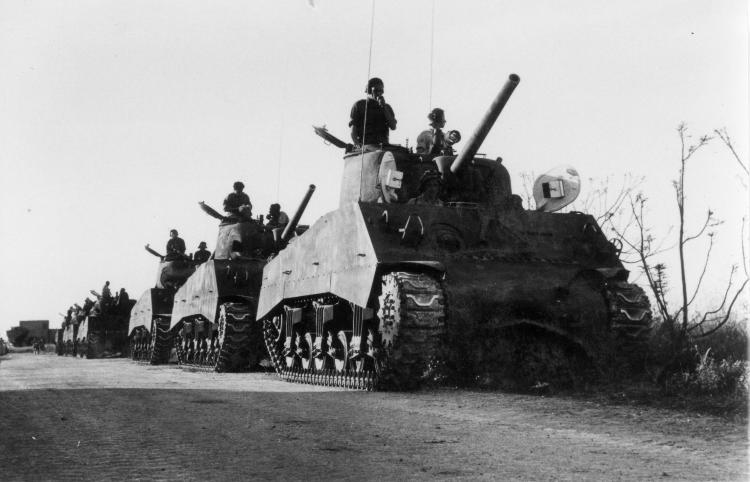
Tanks of the Israeli 8th Armoured Brigade, 1948

This article deals with the history and development of tanks of the Israel Defense Forces (particularly Israeli Ground Forces), from their first use after World War II in the establishment of the State of Israel after the end of the British Mandate, and into the Cold War and what today is considered the modern era.

== History ==
=== Pre-independence ===
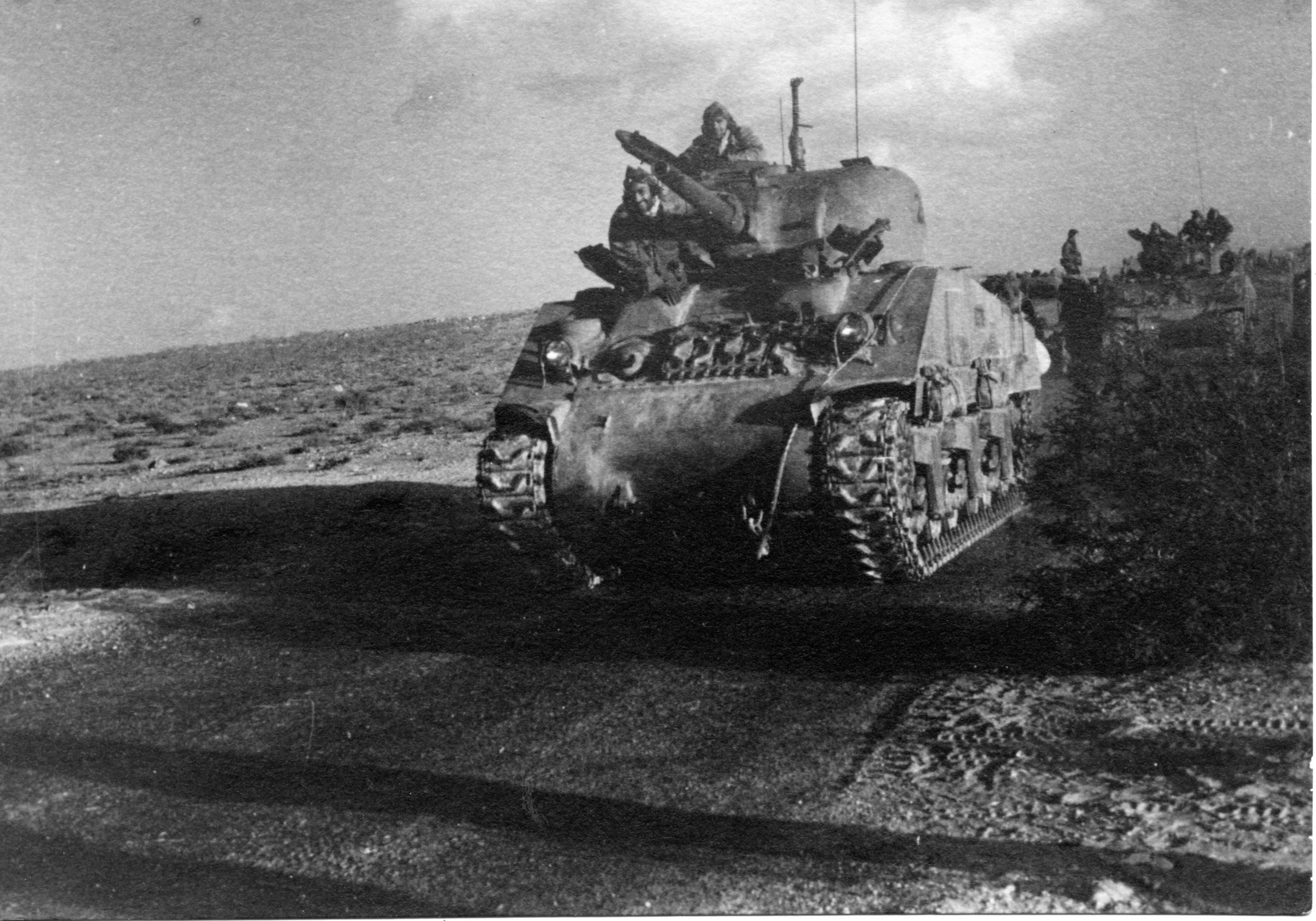
Palmach M4 Sherman tank leading a convoy

Before Israel gained independence in 1948, neither Israel nor the Arab nations surrounding it had many tanks. They both had to obtain their weapons through arms dealers or from any country that would supply them.

The first Israeli armoured tanks and vehicles were, as was the case of many other countries, imported or based on others' designs, but they eventually developed their own. In Israel, plans were made to import them before the country was even formed, and rudimentary armoured cars and trucks were prepared in secret.

Following the United Nations General Assembly vote for the Partition Plan for Palestine on 29 November 1947, the Jewish forces started to build and procure mobile armoured cars and supply trucks and to purchase and bring in tanks and a large number of half-tracks to prepare for the termination of the British Mandate and the Israeli proclamation of statehood on 14 May 1948. During this period, the Jewish and Arab communities under the British Mandate clashed with only light arms, while the British intervened only occasionally during their withdrawal.

From January onwards, operations became increasingly militarised. A number of Arab Liberation Army regiments infiltrated into Palestine, each active in a variety of distinct sectors around the different coastal towns.

The Army of the Holy War, under the command of Abd al-Qadir al-Husayni, came from Egypt with several hundred men. Having recruited a few thousand volunteers, al-Husayni organised the blockade of the 100,000 Jewish residents of Jerusalem. To counter this, the Yishuv authorities tried to supply the city using convoys of up to 100 armoured vehicles, but the number of casualties in the relief convoys surged. By March, al-Husayni's tactic had paid off. Almost all of Haganah's armoured vehicles had been destroyed, the blockade was in full operation, and hundreds of Haganah members who had tried to bring supplies into the city had been killed. The situation for those who dwelt in the Jewish settlements in the highly isolated Negev and north of Galilee was more critical.

The Arab League began to believe that the Palestinian Arabs, reinforced by the Arab Liberation Army, could put an end to partition. The British decided on 7 February 1948 to support the annexation of the Arab part of Palestine by Jordan.

David Ben-Gurion ordered Yigal Yadin to plan for the announced intervention of the Arab states. The result of his analysis was Plan Dalet, whose stated purpose was to take control of the territory of the Jewish state and to defend its borders and people, including the Jewish population outside of the borders, in expectation of an invasion by regular Arab armies. According to the Israeli Yehoshafat Harkabi, Plan Dalet called for the conquest of Arab towns and villages inside and along the borders of the area allocated to the proposed Jewish state—according to the UN Partition Plan.

Plan Dalet went into effect at the start of April, marking the second phase of the war. Haganah took the offensive, beginning with Operation Nachshon, which sought to lift the blockade on Jerusalem. Armored cars and forces tried to clear out the roads and escort supply trucks as they tried to reach Jerusalem. Arab attacks on communications and roads intensified. The failure of the convoys and the loss of Jewish armoured vehicles shook the Yishuv leaders' confidence. Fifteen hundred men from Haganah's Givati brigade and Palmach's Harel brigade conducted sorties to free up the route to the city between 5 April and 20 April. The operation was successful, and enough foodstuffs to last two months were trucked into Jerusalem for distribution to the Jewish population. The success of the operation was assisted by the death of al-Husayni in combat.

At the same time, the large-scale operation of the Arab Liberation Army was defeated at Mishmar HaEmek. Their Druze allies left them through defection.

Within the framework of creating Jewish territorial continuity according to Plan Dalet, the forces of Haganah, Palmach and Irgun moved to consolidate areas with Jewish populations as the British had essentially withdrawn their troops. The situation pushed the leaders of the neighboring Arab states to intervene, with the Arab Legion of Transjordan's monarch, King Abdullah I moving tanks and armoured forces into the territory of the British Mandate of Palestine.

Preparing for Arab intervention, Haganah successfully launched Operations Yiftah and Ben-'Ami and with limited armored forces they tried to hold what areas they had under their control and sent forces to secure the Jewish settlements of Galilee. Operation Kilshon created an Israeli-controlled front around Jerusalem.

With the creation of Israel's army, the three Palmach brigades were disbanded and its members formed the backbone of the Israel Defense Forces high command for many years. The few tanks and armoured cars of these brigades were the beginning of the armoured forces in the Israeli Army.

=== Arab–Israeli War of 1948 ===
The Israel Defence Forces (IDF) was founded following the establishment of the State of Israel, after Defense Minister and Prime Minister David Ben-Gurion issued an order on 26 May 1948. In 1946, Ben-Gurion had decided that the Yishuv would probably have to defend itself against both the Palestinian Arabs and neighbouring Arab states and accordingly began a "massive, covert arms acquisition campaign in the West". By September 1947 the Haganah had "10,489 rifles, 702 light machine-guns, 2,666 submachine guns, 186 medium machine-guns, 672 two-inch mortars and 92 three-inch (76 mm) mortars" and acquired many more during the first few months of hostilities. Initially, the Haganah had no heavy machine guns, artillery, armored vehicles, anti-tank or anti-aircraft weapons, nor military aircraft or tanks. In the United States, Yishuv agents purchased three B-17 bombers, and dozens of half-tracks, which were repainted and defined as "agricultural equipment". In Western Europe, Haganah agents amassed guns and mortars but most importantly ten H-35 light tanks, and a large number of half-tracks. The Israelis also got two Cromwell tanks from sympathizers at a arms depot in the Haifa port area, which would form the basis of the Israeli Armored Corps.

Then on 14 May 1948, David Ben-Gurion declared the establishment of a Jewish state in Eretz-Israel to be known as the State of Israel, a few hours before the termination of the Mandate at midnight and conflict with Arab irregulars as well as forces of the neighboring Arab states, Egypt, Jordan (Transjordan) and Syria, invaded what had just ceased to be the territory of the British Mandate, and immediately attacked Jewish settlements. The Israeli tank force included a small number of Sherman and Cromwell tanks, as well as ten Hotchkiss H-39 light tanks. Egypt used Shermans, Crusaders and Matildas, as well as Light Tank Mark VI and M22 Locust light tanks. They may have used some Valentines, as well. The Syrians had Renault R35s and R39s (an improved R35). The Lebanese used Renault FTs.

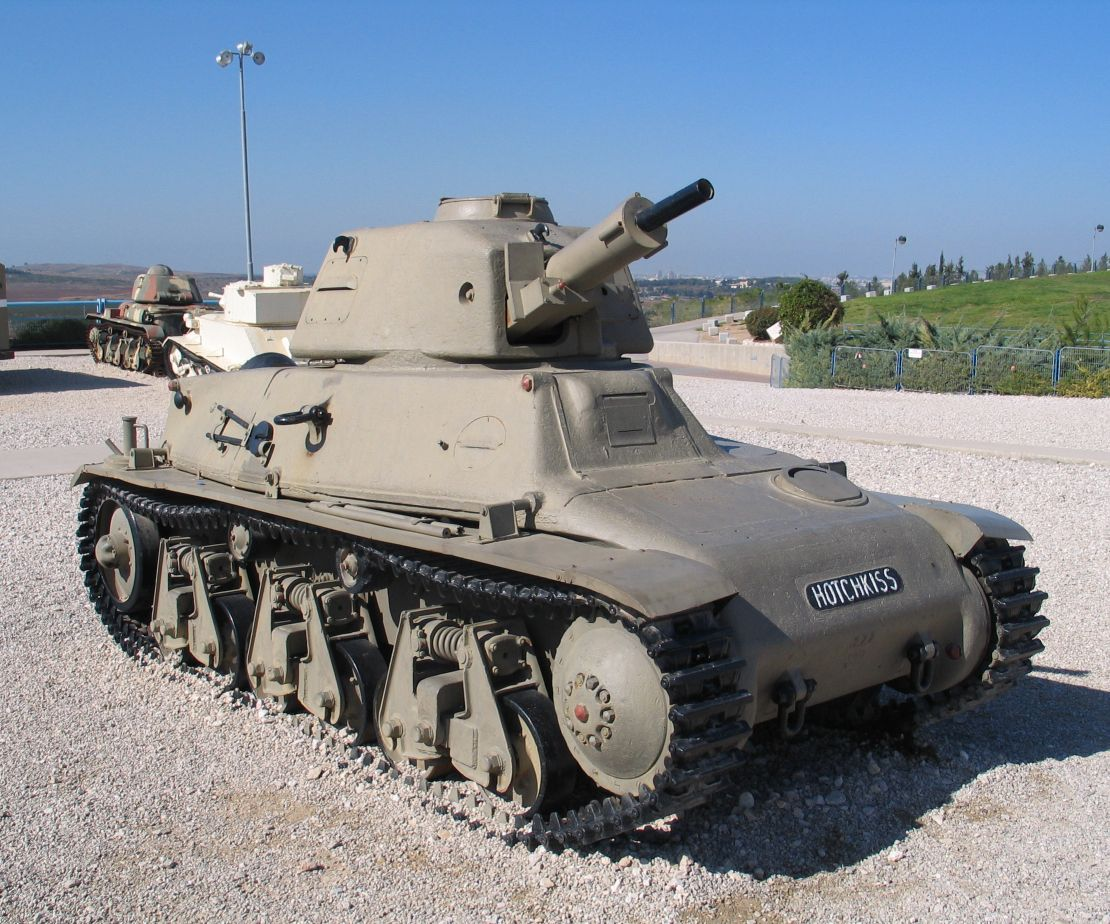
A Hotchkiss H35 tank. Char léger modèle 1935 H modifié 39 in Latrun, Israel

The new army of Israel organized itself quickly during the ensuing 1948 Arab–Israeli War as the neighbouring Arab states attacked Israel. Twelve infantry and armored brigades formed: Golani, Carmeli, Alexandroni, Kiryati, Givati, Etzioni, the 7th, and 8th armored brigades, Oded, Harel, Yiftach, and Negev. Some of the armoured brigades formed during the 1948 Arab–Israeli War had Sherman tanks and mounted infantry and some also contained an artillery element. One of the brigades, the 7th Armored Brigade (Hebrew: חטיבה שבע, Hativa Sheva) was the main force in the Battles of Latrun.

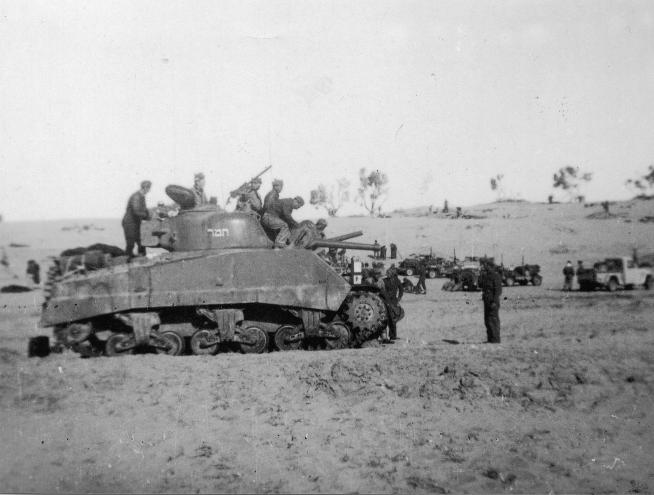
Israel army Sherman Tank during Operation Horev, December 1948

Facing them were the forces of Egypt's army, which in 1948 was able to field a maximum of around 40,000 men. Initially, an expeditionary force of 10,000 men was sent to Palestine, consisting of five infantry battalions, one armoured battalion equipped with British Light Tank Mk VI and Matilda tanks, one battalion of sixteen 25-pounder guns, a battalion of eight 6-pounder guns and one medium-machine-gun battalion with supporting troops.

The other main force facing Israel was Jordan's Arab Legion, which was considered the most effective Arab force. Armed, trained, and commanded by British officers, this 8,000–12,000 strong force was organised in four infantry/mechanised regiments supported by some 40 artillery pieces and 75 armoured cars. Until January 1948, it was reinforced by the 3,000-strong Transjordan Frontier Force. As many as 48 British officers served in the Arab Legion. Glubb Pasha, was the commander of the Legion. The Arab Legion joined the war in May 1948, but fought only in the areas that King Abdullah wanted to secure for Jordan: the West Bank, including East Jerusalem.

On 14 May Syria invaded Israel with the 1st Infantry Brigade supported by a battalion of armoured cars, a company of French R35 and R39 tanks, an artillery battalion and other units. However within a week it had been halted in a series of battles around Degania.

The heaviest fighting occurred in Jerusalem and on the Jerusalem – Tel Aviv road, between Jordan's Arab Legion and Israeli forces.

After the 1948 war, the Israel Defense Forces shifted to low intensity conflict against Arab Palestinian guerrillas.

=== Purchase of French arms ===
Following the outbreak of the Algerian War in late 1954, France began to ship more and more arms to Israel. In November 1954, Shimon Peres visited Paris, where he was received by the French Defense Minister Marie-Pierre Kœnig, who told him that France would sell Israel any weapons it wanted. By early 1955, France was shipping large amounts of weapons to Israel.

=== 1956 Suez Crisis ===
In the period right before the 1956 Suez Crisis, the Israelis became deeply troubled by Egypt's procurement of large amounts of Soviet weaponry that included 530 armored vehicles, of which 230 were tanks; the influx of advanced weaponry altered an already shaky balance of power. Additionally, Israel believed Egypt had formed a secret alliance with Jordan and Syria. As tensions mounted, Israel asked to purchase 60 M47 tanks from the United States in 1955, but was rejected. (Israel applied again in 1958, this time to purchase 100 M47 tanks, but the answer was the same.)

On 26 July 1956, Egyptian president Gamal Abdel Nasser announced his intention in a speech to natioanize the Suez Canal and sent forces to seize it. He also closed the Straits of Tiran to Israeli shipping and blockaded the Gulf of Aqaba, in contravention of the Constantinople Convention of 1888.

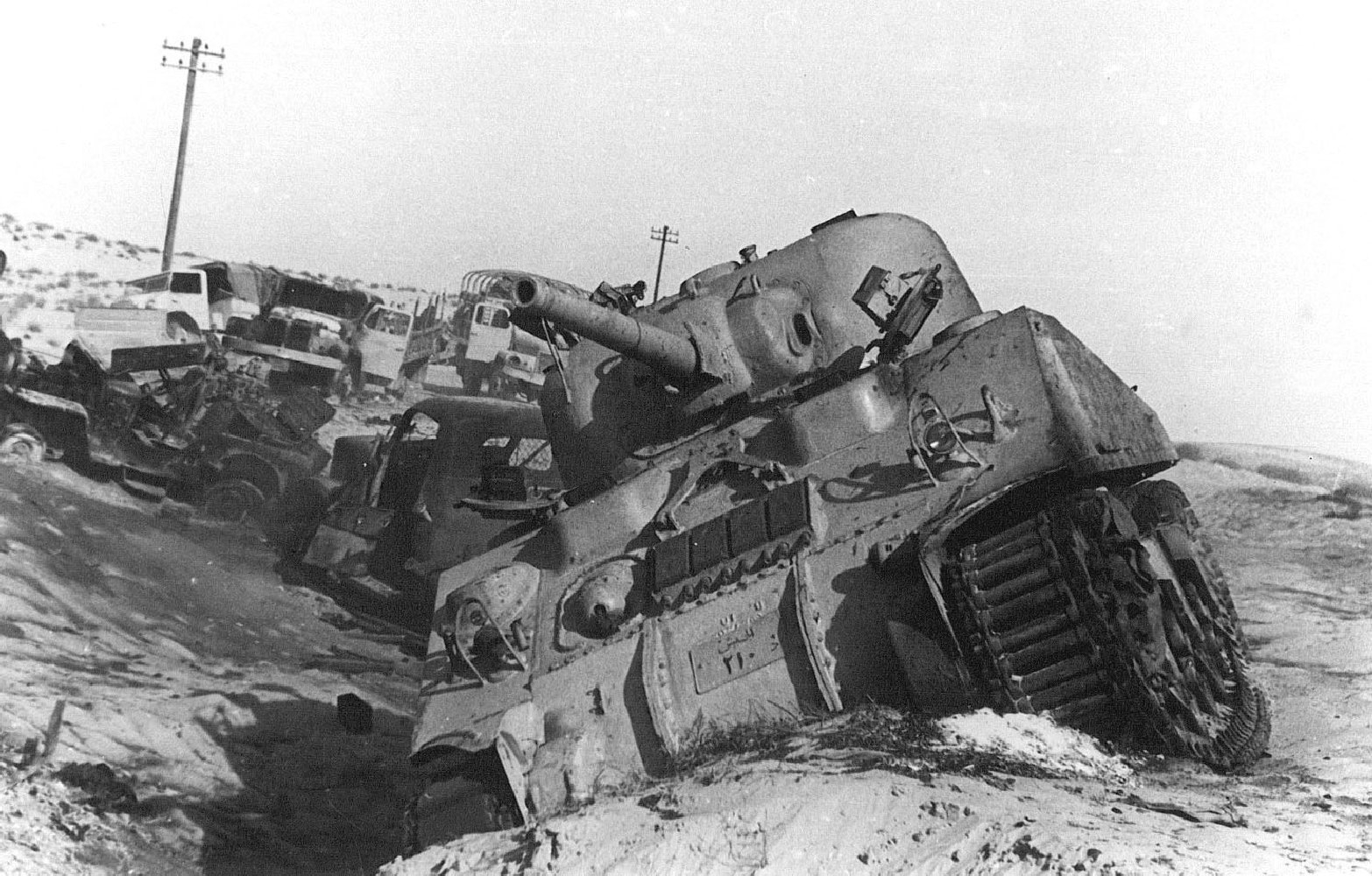
Damaged Israeli Sherman tank and vehicles, Sinai War, 1956

So with British and French support, Israel sent its armoured forces into the Sinai and Gaza Strip in the 1956 Suez Crisis, the IDF's first test of strength since 1949. The new army captured the Sinai Peninsula. The main IDF tank at the time was the AMX-13 along with some American-made World War II armour. The Egyptian military was well-equipped with weapons from the Soviet Union, such as T-34 and JS-3 tanks and self-propelled guns.

The Gaza Strip city of Rafah was strategically important to Israel because control of that city would sever the Gaza Strip from the Sinai and provide a way to the main centres of the northern Sinai, al-Arish and al-Qantarah. Holding the forts outside of Rafah were a mixture of Egyptian and Palestinian forces in the 5th Infantry Brigade, commanded by Brigadier General Jaafar al-Abd. Rafah itself was garrisoned by the 87th Palestinian Infantry Brigade. Assigned to capture Rafah were 1st Infantry Brigade, led by Colonel Benjamin Givli, and the 27th Armored Brigade, commanded by Colonel Haim Bar-Lev. To the south of Rafah were a series of mine-filled sand dunes and to the north a series of fortified hills.

Dayan ordered the IDF forces to seize Crossroads 12 in the central Rafah area, and to focus on breaking through, rather than reducing every Egyptian strongpoint. The IDF assault began with Israeli sappers and engineers clearing a path at night through the minefields that surrounded Rafah. French warships led by the cruiser Georges Leygues provided fire support, through Dayan had a low opinion of French gunnery, complaining that the French only struck the Egyptian reserves. Using the two paths cleared through the southern minefields, IDF tanks entered the Rafah salient. Under Egyptian artillery fire, the IDF force raced ahead and took Crossroads 12 with the loss of 2 killed and 22 wounded. In the north, the Israeli troops fought a confused series of night actions, but were successful in storming Hills 25, 25A, 27 and 29 at the cost of six killed. In the morning of 1 November, Israeli AMX-13s encircled and took Hills 34 and 36. At that point, General al-Abd ordered his forces to abandon their posts outside of Rafah and retreat into the city.

With Rafah more or less cut off and Israeli forces controlling the northern and eastern roads leading into the city, Dayan ordered the AMX-13s of the 27th Armored Brigade to strike west and take al-Arish. By this point, Nasser had ordered his forces to fall back towards the Suez Canal, so at first the Bar-Lev and his men met little resistance as they advanced across the northern Sinai.

On 29 October, Operation Kadesh–the invasion of the Sinai–began when an Israeli paratrooper battalion was air-dropped into the Sinai Peninsula, east of the Suez Canal near the Mitla Pass. At the same time, Colonel Sharon's 202nd Paratroop Brigade raced towards the pass. Dayan's efforts to maintain strategic surprise bore fruit when the Egyptian commander Field Marshal Abdel Hakim Amer at first treated the reports of an Israeli inclusion into the Sinai as a large raid instead of an invasion and did not order a general alert. By the time that Amer realized his mistake, the Israelis had made significant advances into the Sinai. Dayan had no more plans for further advances beyond the passes, but Sharon decided to attack the Egyptian positions at Jebel Heitan. Sharon sent his lightly armed paratroopers against dug-in Egyptians, supported by aircraft, tanks and heavy artillery. Sharon was responsing to reports of the arrival of the 1st and 2nd Brigades of the 4th Egyptian Armored Division in the area, which Sharon believed would annihilate his forces if he did not seize the high ground. Sharon sent two infantry companies, a mortar battery and some AMX-13 tanks under the command of Mordechai Gur into the Heitan Defile on the afternoon of 31 October. The Egyptian forces occupied strong defensive positions and brought down heavy anti-tank, mortar and machine-gun fire on the IDF force. Gur's men were forced to retreat into the "Saucer", where they were surrounded and came under heavy fire. Sharon sent in another task force, while Gur's men used the cover of night to scale the walls of the Heitan Defile. During the ensuing action, the Egyptians were defeated and forced to retreat.

On 30 October, a probing attack by Israeli armour under Major Izhak Ben-Ari turned into an assault on the Umm Qataf ridge that ended in failure. To the south, another unit of the Israeli 7th Armored Brigade discovered the al-Dayyiqa gap in the Jebel Halal ridge of the "Hedgehog". The Israeli forces stormed and took the gap. An IDF force entered the al-Dayyiqa and at dawn on 31 October attacked Abu Uwayulah. After an hour's fighting, Abu Uwayulah fell to the IDF.

On the morning of 1 November, Israeli and French aircraft launched attacks on the Egyptian troops at Umm Qataf and the 37th Armored Brigade joined the 10th Brigade to assault Umm Qataf. The Egyptian commander ordered a general retreat from the "Hedgehog" on the evening of 1 November.

=== 1967 Six-Day War ===
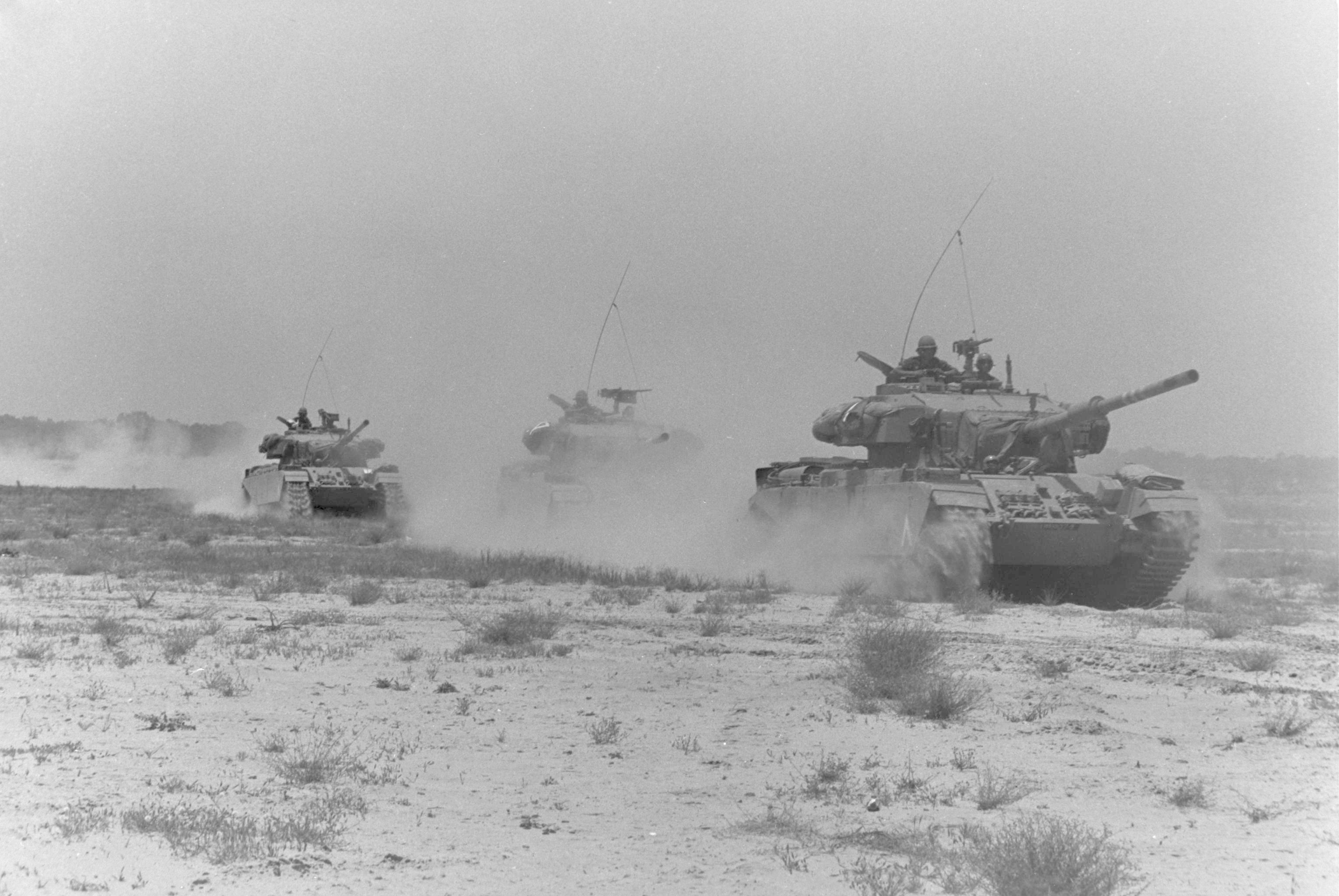
Israeli Centurions shortly before the Six-Day War

In the 1967 Six-Day War, with the exception of Jordan, the Arabs relied principally on Soviet tanks and weaponry. Egypt, Syria and Iraq used T-34/85, T-54, T-55, PT-76, and SU-100/152 World War II-vintage self-propelled guns. Jordan's army was equipped with American weaponry, and used M-47, M-48, and M-48A1 Patton tanks. Israeli weapons were mainly of Western origin and its armoured units were mostly of British and American design and manufacture. In the early 1960s, Israel signed a deal with West Germany to purchase 150 M48A2 Patton tanks. However, due to strong Arab nation opposition, only 40 were received. Then the United States decided to supply the remaining 110 M48A2 Patton tanks and to add another 100 M48 tanks. So, in 1965, Israel received 90 M48 tanks from the United States and another 120 M48 tanks in 1966. At this time, Israel had 250 M48 Patton tanks, 150 of them M48A1s and 100 of them M48A2s, all armed with a 90mm main gun. Israel upgraded those tanks to M48A3s by replacing their engines and transmissions with newer models. These tanks were also fitted with a new 105mm L7 gun (the same as on the Centurion MBT) and with the Israeli Urdan cupola. 293 Centurion tanks were operational at the beginning of the war.

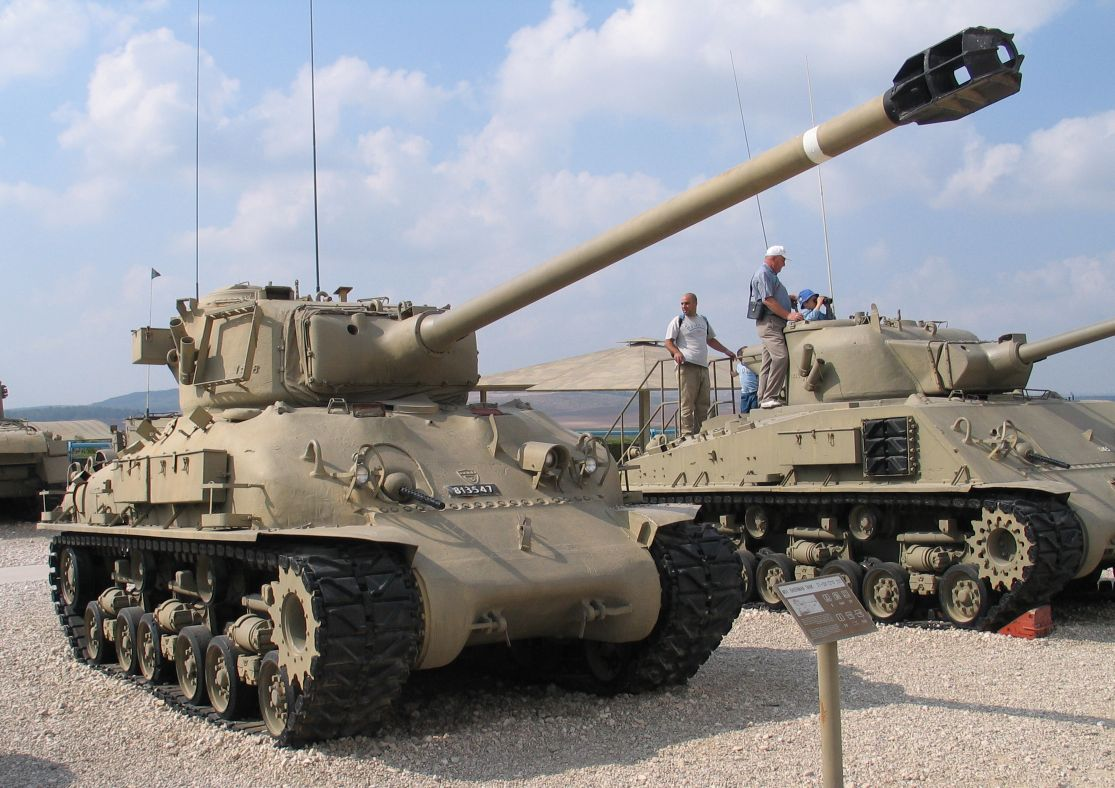
Sherman M-51

So, by the time of the Six-Day War, Israel had the M50 and M51 Shermans, M48A3 Patton, Centurion, AMX-13. The Sherman M-50 and the Sherman M-51, were known abroad as the Super Sherman, were modified versions of the American M4 Sherman tank. The Sherman also underwent extensive modifications, including a larger 105mm medium velocity French gun, a redesigned turret, wider tracks, more armour, and an upgraded engine and suspension. The Centurion was upgraded with the British 105 mm L7 gun before the war. During the Six-Day War, only 120 of Israel's 250 M48 tanks were combat ready; they were mainly engaged on the Sinai front against the Egyptian army. M48s were also used with mixed results during the war. On the Sinai front, Israeli M48s, up-gunned with 105 mm L7 rifled guns, were used with success against Egyptian IS-3s, T-54s, T-34s, and SU-100s supplied by the Soviet Union, in the second battle of Abu-Ageila. However, on the West Bank front, Jordanian M48s were often defeated by Israeli 105mm Centurions and World War II-era M4 Shermans (M-51s up-gunned with 105 mm guns). In pure technical terms, the Patton was superior to the Sherman, with shots at more than 1,000 meters simply glancing off the M48's armor. However, the 105 mm gun of the Israeli Shermans fired a high-explosive anti-tank (HEAT) round designed to defeat the T-62 tank, which was the Soviet response to the M48's successor in American service, the M60. The Jordanian Pattons' failure on the West Bank could also be attributed to Israeli air superiority. The Israeli Army captured about 100 Jordanian M48 and M48A1 tanks and pressed them into service in their own units after the war.

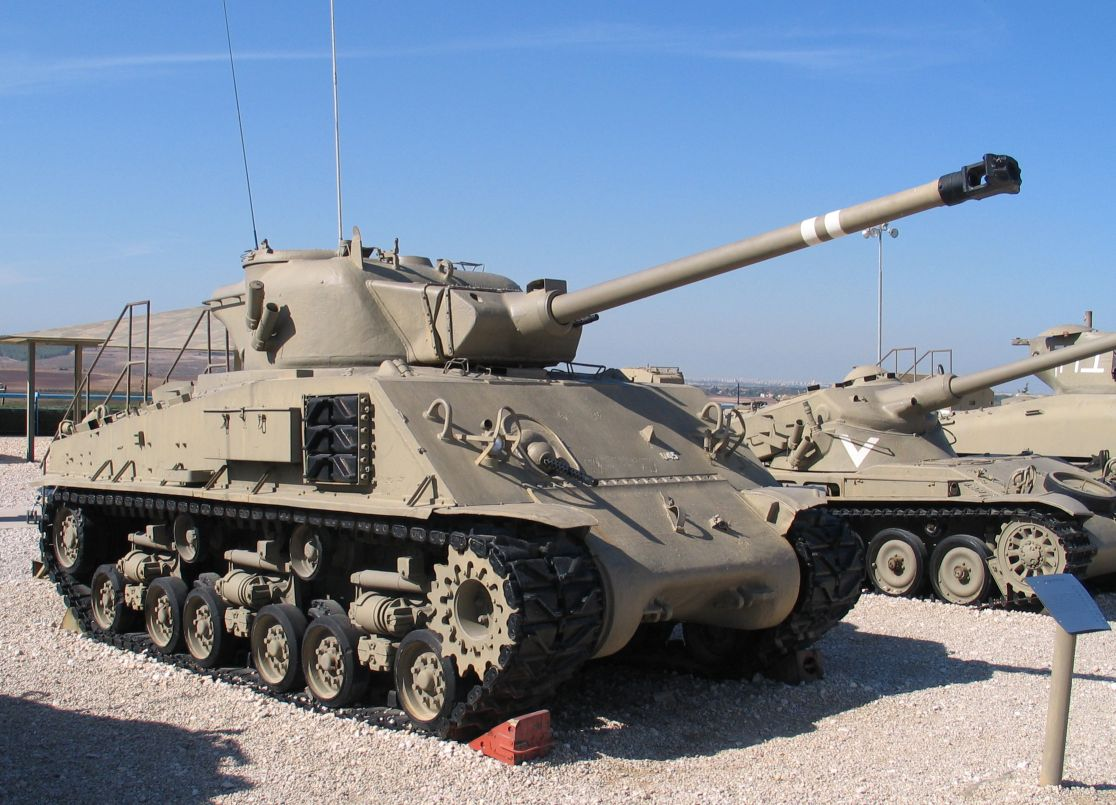
Israeli M50 Super Sherman

The Egyptian forces consisted of seven divisions: four armoured, two infantry, and one mechanized infantry. Overall, Egypt had around 100,000 troops and 900–950 tanks in the Sinai, backed by 1,100 armored personnel carriers (APC) and 1,000 artillery pieces. This arrangement was thought to be based on Soviet doctrine, where mobile armour units at strategic depth provided a dynamic defense while infantry units engaged in defensive battles.

Israeli forces concentrated on the border with Egypt included six armoured brigades, one infantry brigade, one mechanized infantry brigade, three paratrooper brigades, a total of around 70,000 men and 700 tanks organized in three armoured divisions.

The Israelis broke through with tank-led assaults against the Egyptian army in Sinai. In the Battle of Abu-Ageila, the Israeli 38th Armored Division under Major-General Ariel Sharon assaulted Um-Katef a heavily fortified area defended by the Egyptian 2nd Infantry Division where the Egyptians also had a battalion of tank destroyers and a tank regiment, formed of Soviet World War II armour, which included 90 T-34-85 tanks, 22 SU-100 tank destroyers, and about 16,000 men. The Israelis had about 14,000 men and 150 post-World War II tanks including the AMX-13, Centurions, and M50 Super Shermans (modified M-4 Sherman tanks). Israeli tanks managed to penetrate the northern flank of Abu Ageila, and by dusk, all units were in position. The Israelis then brought up 90 105mm and 155mm artillery guns for a preparatory barrage, and Israeli tanks assaulted the northernmost Egyptian defenses and were largely successful, though an entire armoured brigade was stalled by mines, and had only one mine-clearance tank. The battle ended in an Israeli victory, with 40 Egyptian and 19 Israeli tanks destroyed.

In the center of Israel, the Jordanian Armed Forces, which included 11 brigades totalling some 55,000 troops and equipped with some 300 modern Western tanks, were brought to bear. Nine of these brigades (45,000 troops, 270 tanks, 200 artillery pieces) were deployed in the West Bank, including the elite 40th armoured; the other two were in the Jordan Valley. The Jordanian Army, then known as the Arab Legion, moved against the Israeli forces. Against Jordan's forces on the West Bank, Israel deployed about 40,000 troops and 200 tanks (8 brigades). Israeli Central Command forces consisted of five brigades. The first two were permanently stationed near Jerusalem and were called the Jerusalem Brigade and the mechanized Harel Brigade. Mordechai Gur's 55th paratrooper brigade was summoned from the Sinai front. The 10th Armored Brigade was stationed north of the West Bank. The Israeli Northern Command provided a division (3 brigades) led by Major-General Elad Peled, which was stationed to the north of the West Bank, in the Jezreel Valley. The Israelis launched an offensive to push back the Jordanian forces and encircle Jerusalem, supported by intense tank, artillery and mortar fire to soften up Jordanian positions and captured their objectives after heavy fighting. The Jordanian M48 Pattons, with their external fuel tanks, proved vulnerable at short distances, even to the Israeli-modified Shermans. During the war, Israel captured about 100 of Jordan's 170 M48/M48A1 tanks. Israel decided not to take the M47 tanks left by the Jordanian army, as they were already obsolete at that time.

In the north on the Golan Heights, the Israeli forces faced the Syrian army which consisted of about 75,000 men grouped in nine brigades, supported by an adequate amount of artillery and armour. Israeli forces used in combat consisted of two brigades (the 8th Armored Brigade and the Golani Brigade) in the northern part of the front at Givat HaEm, and another two in the center. The 8th Armored Brigade, led by Colonel Albert Mandler, advanced into the Golan Heights from Givat HaEm. Its advance was spearheaded by Engineering Corps sappers and eight bulldozers, which cleared away barbed wire and mines. As they advanced, the force came under fire, and five bulldozers were immediately hit. The Israeli tanks, with their maneuverability sharply reduced by the terrain, advanced slowly under fire toward the fortified village of Sir al-Dib, with their ultimate objective being the fortress at Qala. Israeli casualties steadily mounted. Part of the attacking force lost its way and emerged opposite of Za'ura, a redoubt defended by Syrian reservists. With the situation critical, Colonel Mandler ordered simultaneous assaults on Za'ura and Qala. Heavy and confused fighting followed, with Israeli and Syrian tanks struggling around obstacles and firing at extremely short ranges. The first three Israeli tanks to enter Qala were stopped by a Syrian bazooka team, and a relief column of seven Syrian tanks arrived to repel the attackers. The Israelis took heavy fire from the houses, but could not turn back, as other forces were advancing behind them, and they were on a narrow path with mines on either side. The Israelis continued pressing forward, and called for air support. A pair of Israeli jets destroyed two of the Syrian tanks, and the remainder withdrew. The surviving defenders of Qala retreated after their commander was killed. Meanwhile, Za'ura fell in an Israeli assault, and the Israelis also captured the 'Ein Fit fortress.

Israel conquered the Sinai Peninsula, Gaza Strip, West Bank (including East Jerusalem) and Golan Heights from the surrounding Arab states, changing the balance of power in the region as well as the role of the IDF.

=== War of Attrition ===
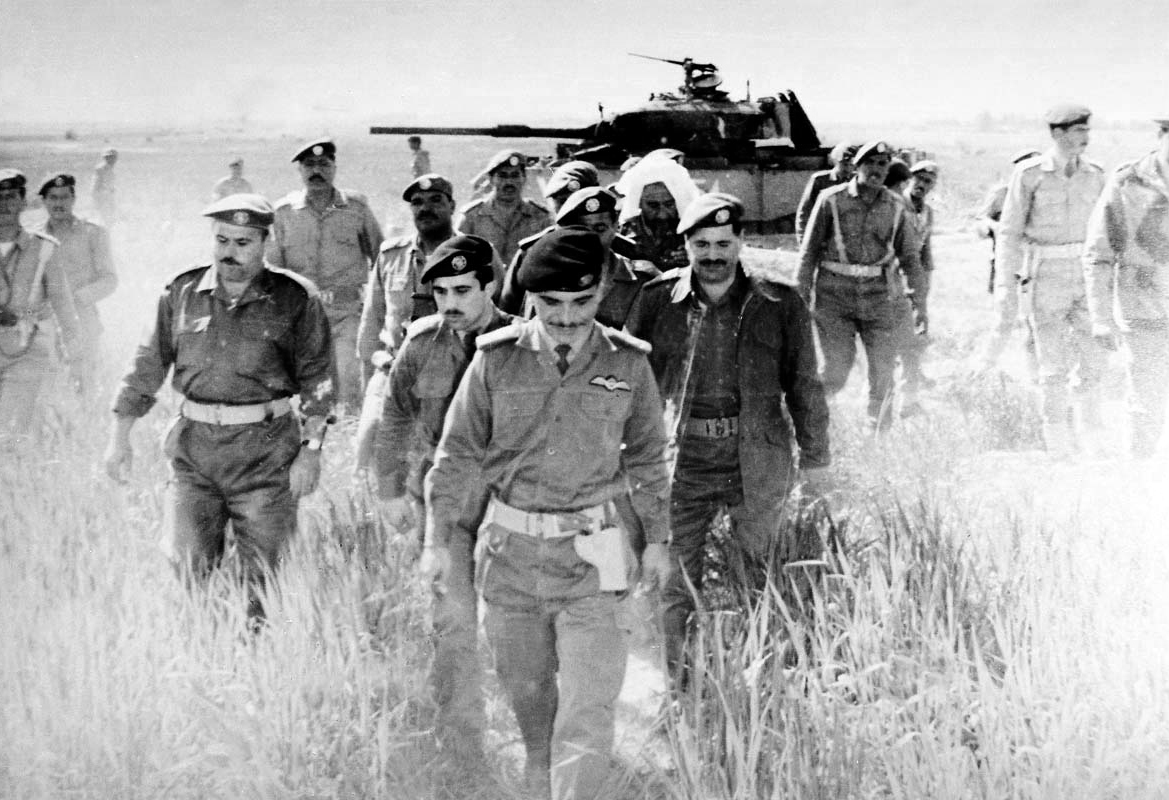
King Hussein after checking an abandoned Israeli tank after Israeli raid at Karameh

The War of Attrition was fighting from 1967 to 1970 between Israel and Egypt, Jordan, PLO and their allies following the 1967 Six-Day War with support from the armored forces such as in the Israeli raid at Karameh, but no major tank battles. Egyptian President Gamal Abdel Nasser pushed for a military initiative to compel Israel or the international community to facilitate a full Israeli withdrawal from Sinai.

Usually it was limited artillery duels and small-scale incursions into Sinai, but by 1969 the Egyptian Army started larger-scale operations. On March 8, 1969, Nasser proclaimed the official launch of the War of Attrition, characterized by large-scale shelling along the Suez Canal, extensive aerial warfare and commando raids. Hostilities continued until August 1970 shortly before Nasser's death and ended with a ceasefire, the frontiers remaining the same as when the war began, with no real commitment to serious peace negotiations.

=== Yom Kippur War ===
Egyptian president Anwar Sadat had signaled soon after he Nasser's death that, in return for a total withdrawal from the Sinai Peninsula, he was ready to recognize Israel as an independent state but this did not lead to any agreement with Israel, so Sadat felt he had only the military option. The Yom Kippur war was a conflict between the Arab world and Israel that lasted from October 6, 1973 to October 25, 1973. The Yom Kippur War began when a coalition of Arab states led by Egypt and Syria attacked Israel on Yom Kippur which happens to be the Jewish day of atonement and the holiest day for people of the Judaic faith.

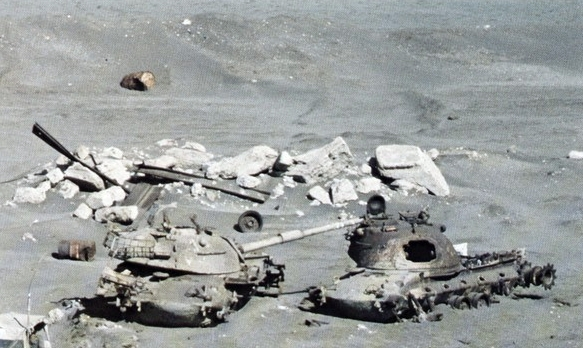
Destroyed Israeli M48 Patton tanks on the banks of the Suez Canal

The Arab coalition launched a joint surprise attack on Israeli positions in the Israeli-occupied territories on Yom Kippur, the holiest day in Judaism, which occurred that year during the Muslim holy month of Ramadan. Egyptian and Syrian forces crossed ceasefire lines to enter the Sinai Peninsula and Golan Heights

Anticipating a swift Israeli armored counterattack by three armored divisions, the Egyptians had armed their assault force with large numbers of man-portable anti-tank weapons—rocket-propelled grenades and the less numerous but more advanced Sagger guided missiles, which proved devastating to the first Israeli armored counterattacks. Each of the five infantry divisions that was to cross the canal had been equipped with RPG-7 rockets and RPG-43 grenades, and reinforced with an anti-tank guided missile battalion.

The Israelis who have begun to receive quantities of the US M60 Patton tanks and use in their armoured forces, counterattacked the Egyptians with the 162nd Armored Division composed of three brigades totaling 183 tanks and the Israeli 143rd Armoured Division, which was led by General Ariel Sharon, who had been reinstated as a division commander at the outset of the war and Egyptian armored attacks were repulsed with heavy losses. Then the Israeli forces detected a gap between the Egyptian Second and Third armies and as these armies attacked eastward in six simultaneous thrusts over a broad front, they left behind five infantry divisions to hold the bridgeheads over the Suez canal crossings. The attacking Egyptian forces consisted of 800-1,000 tanks with artillery support. They were up against 700-750 Israeli tanks. The Egyptian armored thrust suffered heavy losses as Egyptian units launched head-on-attacks against the waiting Israeli defenses.

The Israelis repulsed the armoured thrust and followed up with counterattack through the gap between the Egyptian 2nd and 3rd Armies and established bridgeheads on the east and west banks of the canal. The Israeli Armored Divisions then crossed through the breach to the west bank of the canal and swung southward, encircling the 3rd Army. The Israeli forces on the west bank launched an offensive with an armoured thrust toward Ismailia and toward Suez City while other Israeli forces pushed west toward Cairo and south toward Adabiya. By the end of the war, the Israelis had advanced to positions some 101 kilometres from Egypt's capital, Cairo, and occupied 1,600 square kilometres west of the Suez Canal. They had also cut the Cairo-Suez road and encircled the bulk of Egypt's Third Army.

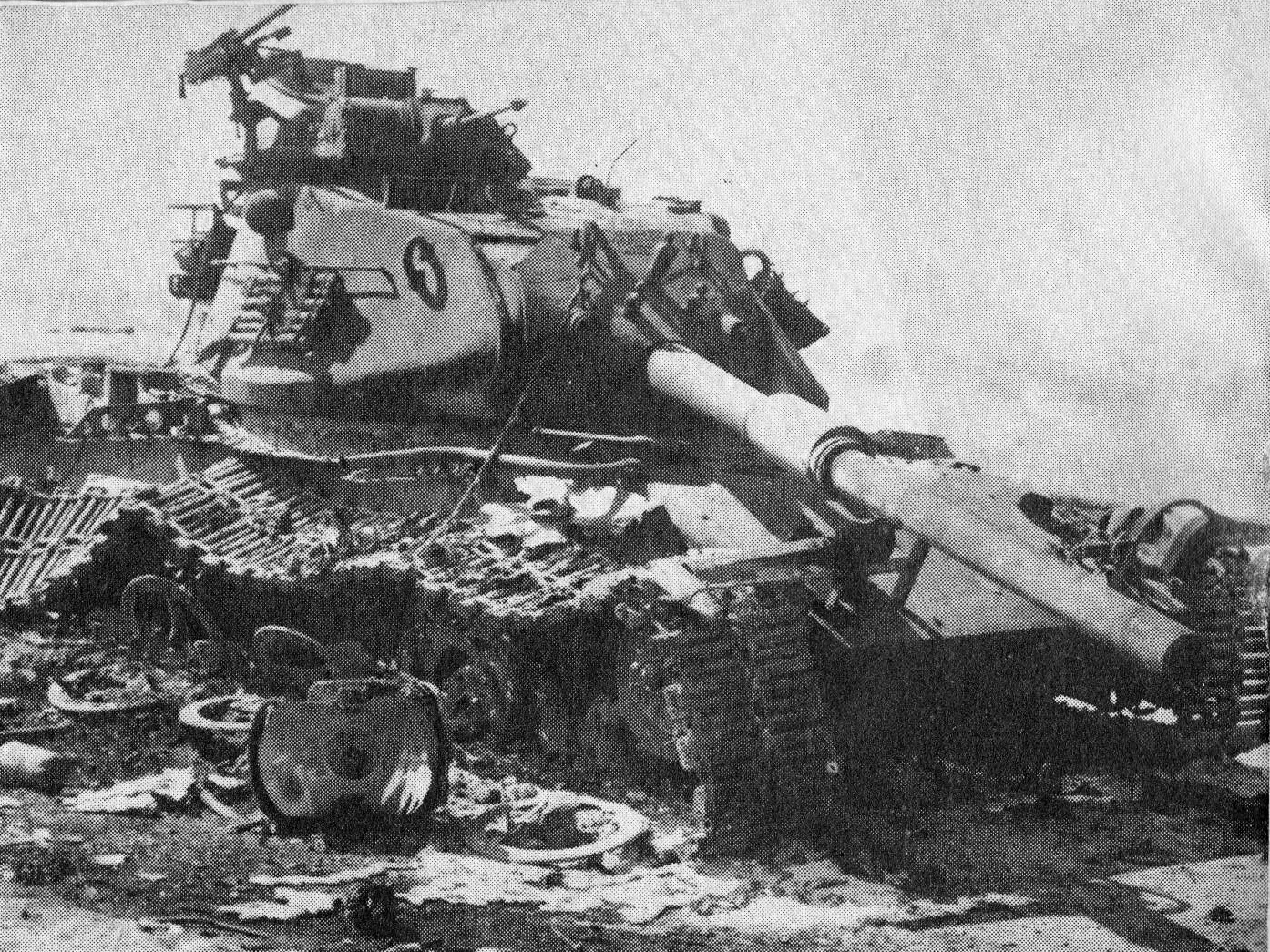
An Israeli M60 Patton tank destroyed in the Sinai

One of the greatest tank battles in history, the Battle of Golan Heights, took place during the Yom Kippur War. In the Golan Heights, the Syrians attacked two Israeli brigades and eleven artillery batteries with five divisions (the 7th, 9th and 5th, with the 1st and 3rd in reserve) and 188 batteries. They began their attack with an airstrike by about 100 aircraft and a 50-minute artillery barrage. The forward brigades of three divisions then penetrated the cease-fire lines and bypassed United Nations observer posts, followed by the main assault force, which was covered by mobile anti-aircraft batteries, bulldozers to penetrate anti-tank ditches, bridge-layers to overcome obstacles, and mine-clearance vehicles.

The engineering vehicles were priority targets for Israeli gunners and took heavy losses, but Syrian infantrymen, braving intense fire, advanced forward and used their entrenching tools to build up earthen causeways for the tanks, enabling them to overcome anti-tank ditches.

At the onset of the battle, the Israeli brigades of some 3,000 troops, 180 tanks and 60 artillery pieces faced off against three infantry divisions with large armour components comprising 28,000 Syrian troops, 800 tanks and 600 artillery pieces. In addition, the Syrians deployed two armoured divisions from the second day onwards.

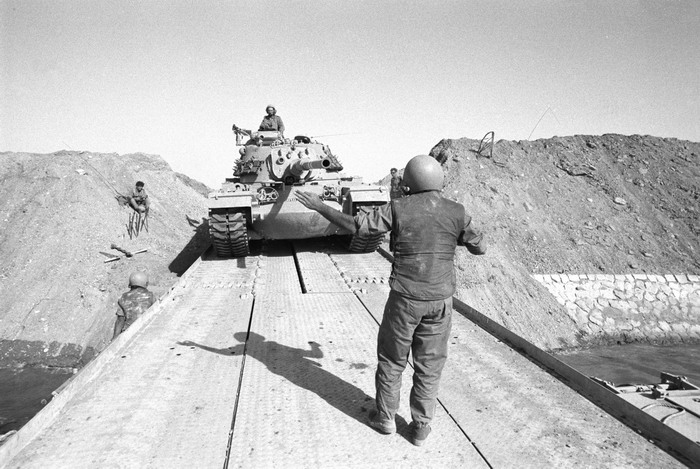
Israeli tanks crossing the Suez Canal

Every Israeli tank deployed on the Golan Heights was engaged during the initial attacks. Reservists were directed to the Golan as quickly as possible. They were assigned to tanks and sent to the front as soon as they arrived at army depots, without waiting for the crews they trained with to arrive, machine guns to be installed on the tanks, or taking the time to calibrate the tank guns (a time-consuming process known as bore-sighting). The Syrians had expected it to take at least 24 hours for Israeli reserves to reach the front lines; in fact, reserve units began reaching the battle lines only 15 hours after the war began. Israeli reserve forces approaching the Golan Heights were subjected to Syrian artillery fire directed from Mount Hermon.

Syrian forces suffered heavy losses as Israeli tanks and infantry fought desperately to buy time for reserve forces to reach the front lines, and conducted stopgap blocking actions whenever the Syrians were on the verge of breaking through. However, the Syrians pressed the attack in spite of their losses, and the vastly outnumbered defenders lost a number of tanks. Whenever Syrian tanks penetrated the Israeli lines, Israeli gunners would immediately rotate their turrets and destroy them before turning their attention back to the oncoming forces.

At night, the Syrians made deadly use of infrared technology, while the Israelis responded by using illumination rounds and xenon light projectors on their tanks. The tide in the Golan began to turn as the arriving Israeli reserve forces were able to contain the Syrian advance. Beginning on October 8, the Israelis began pushing the Syrians back towards the pre-war ceasefire lines, inflicting heavy tank losses. By October 10, the last Syrian unit in the central sector had been pushed back across the Purple Line (the pre-war ceasefire line). After four days of intense and incessant combat, the Israelis had succeeded in ejecting the Syrians from the entire Golan.

The UN brought about a ceasefire, largely negotiated between the U.S. and Soviet Union, on October 22, but though most heavy fighting ended on October 28, the fighting never stopped until January 18, 1974.

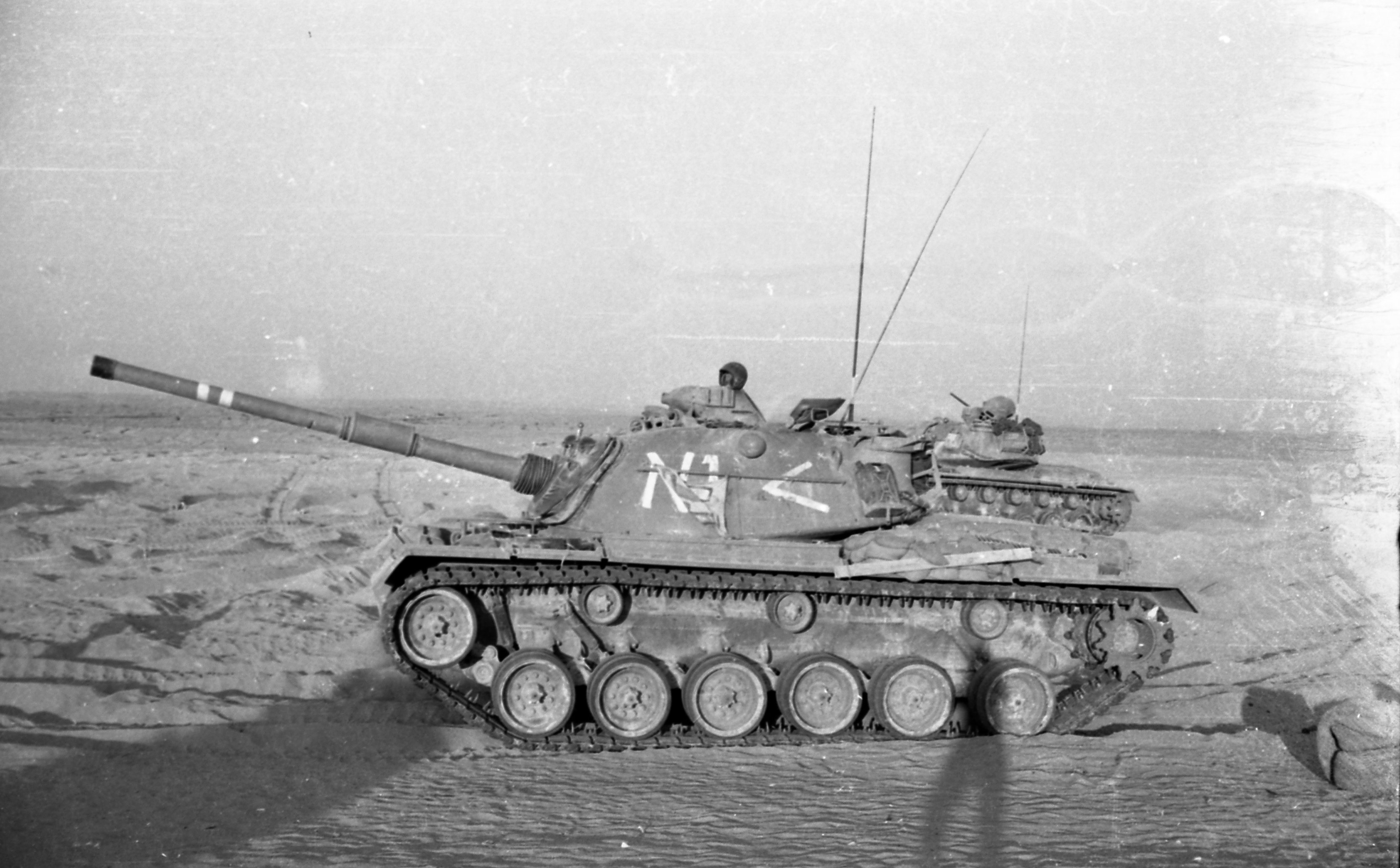
Magach 3 in Sinai, 1969

The IDF had also a number of Magach (מגח; Ma-GAKH) tanks in Israeli service which were based on the American M48 and M60 Patton tanks. The Magach 1, 2, 3, and 5 were based upon M48 tanks; the later Magach 6 and 7 were based upon M60 tanks. These tanks had modifications included replacement of the original 90 mm gun with the British 105 mm L7, lowering the command turret's profile, upgraded communication suite, and replacement of the flammable and weak gasoline engine with a 750 hp diesel one. When the Yom Kippur War broke out, Israel had a total of 540 of the modified M48A3 (with 105mm gun) and M60A1 tanks. But during the war, the tanks suffered heavy losses. The location of flammable hydraulic fluid at the front of the turret was discovered to be a severe vulnerability. A large number of these Israeli tanks were destroyed or terminally hit during the war, mostly in the Sinai front against entrenched Egyptian infantry armed with AT-3 Sagger anti tank missiles. After the war, the losses were replaced with new M48A5 (Magach 5) and M60 (Magach 6) which were fitted with better armor in response to the anti tank missile losses.

The surprise of the Yom Kippur War, and its aftermath completely changed the IDF's procedures and approach to warfare. Organizational changes were made and more time was dedicated to training for conventional warfare. The armoured forces also were involved in the Lebanese Civil War, Operation Litani and later the 1982 Lebanon War, where the IDF ousted Palestinian guerilla organizations from Lebanon.

=== 2023 Israel-Gaza war ===
During the October 7 attacks in 2023, an all-woman crew was the first ever female tank crew in the West to engage in active combat, lasting for 17 hours and eliminating more than 50 Hamas militants.

Israeli tanks have deliberately run over dozens of Palestinian civilians during the war.

== Development of Israel's tanks ==
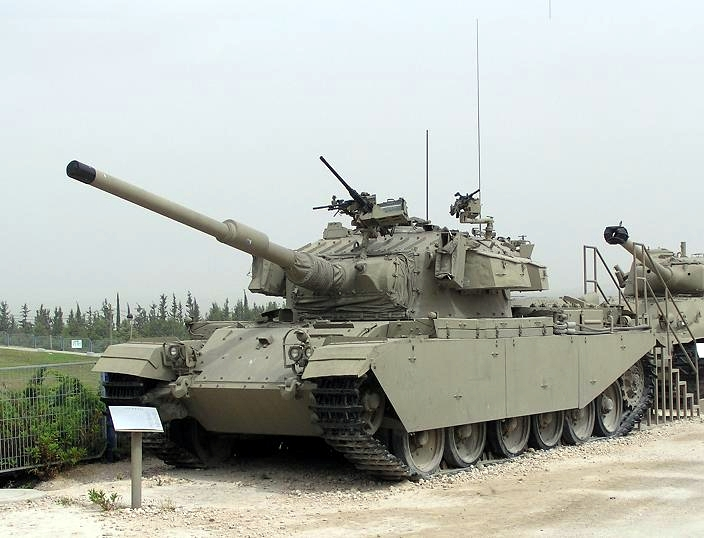
An Israeli Sho't Kal, an upgraded Centurion tank. It was considered in many respects superior to the Soviet T-54/55.

In 1965, Israel's military establishment began research and development on a domestically produced tank, the "Sabra" (not to be confused with the later model of the same name which is now in service, see: Sabra tank). Initially, Britain and Israel collaborated to adapt the United Kingdom's Chieftain tank that had entered British Army service in 1966. However, in 1969, Britain decided not to sell the tank to Israel for political reasons.

Israel Tal, who was serving as a brigade commander after the Suez Crisis, restarted plans to produce an Israeli-made tank, drawing on lessons from the 1973 Yom Kippur War, in which Israeli forces were outnumbered by those of the Middle East's Arab nations.

By 1974 initial designs were completed and prototypes were built. After a brief set of trials, work began to retool the Tel HaShomer ordnance depot for full-time development and construction. After the new facilities were completed, the Merkava was announced to the public in the International Defense Review periodical. The first official images of the tank were then released to the American periodical Armed Forces Journal on May 14, 1977. The IDF officially adopted the tank in December 1978. The first Merkava Mk. 1 tanks were supplied to the IDF in April 1979, nearly nine years after the decision to produce the Merkava Mk. 1 tank was taken. The Merkava series of main battle tank represents the backbone of Israeli armor elements.

In addition to its own designs, Israel had upgraded the many tanks it had and even renamed them. Israel's formerly British Centurions, bought in the late 1960s, were renamed "Sho't" ("scourge" or "whip") by the Israelis and heavily upgraded following their purchase. When the Six-Day War broke out in 1967, the Israel Defense Forces (IDF) had 293 Centurion tanks that were ready for combat out of a total of 385 tanks. During the war, Israel captured 30 of Jordan's 44 Centurion tanks.

Original Centurions had 20 pounder main guns, but these were quickly up-gunned to the British 105 mm L7. The vehicles went through a number of modifications, both major and minor, culminating in the Sho't with blazer package seen in the 1982 invasion of Lebanon and retired with honour during the 1990s. The biggest modifications were the upgrades of the engine, sights and blazer packages.

The engine has been changed to a more efficient diesel engine, fire control has been modernized, armour has been thickened, and an improved ammunition layout allows more rounds to be carried. An improved fire extinguishing system, better electrical system and brakes, and an increased fuel capacity, complete the modifications. The Sh'ot can be distinguished from the Centurion by its raised rear deck, to accommodate the bigger engine. They either have the original 7.62 mm calibre MG on the commander's cupola or have it replaced by a 12.7 mm calibre HMG and American radios.

Many different variants were bought by Israel over the years from many different countries. Many components of these would find their way into the Merkava. Subvariants indicate upgrades received by Sho't Kal tanks during their operational life, including a new turret rotating mechanism, a new gun stabilizer, a new fire-control system and preparations for the installation of the Blazer Reactive armour.

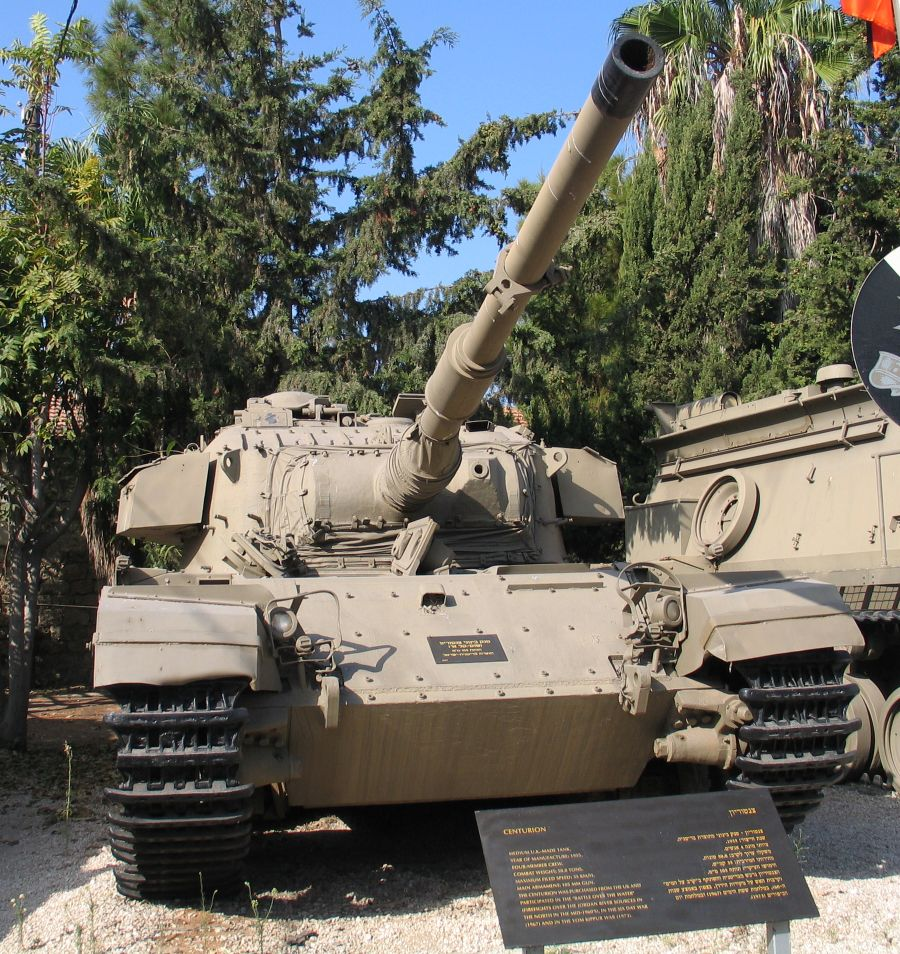
Israeli Sho't Kal Alef

Though the Sho't tank was not commonly perceived as a principal battle tank during the Six-Day War (1967), nor the Yom Kippur war (1973); it was in fact considered the Israeli Army's most-effective tank. This Israeli version of the Centurion earned its legendary status during the Battle of "The Valley of Tears" on the Golan Heights in the 1973 Yom Kippur War.

Less than 100 Centurion tanks of the 7th Armoured Brigade defeated the advance of some 500 Syrian T-55s and T-62s. Fighting the Syrian army on the Golan Heights during the Yom Kippur War, two damaged Centurion/Sho’t tanks engaged approximately 150 Syrian T-55 and T-62 tanks. In the course of the following 30-hour tank battle, the two tanks knocked out over 60 tanks. The destruction of this entire armored division forced the Syrian army to halt their advance.

The Sho't became emblematic of Israeli armour prowess. However, as all tanks in the opening days of the 1973 Yom Kippur war, it proved exceedingly vulnerable to Soviet-made weapons such as the RPG-2, RPG-7, and briefcase Sagger guided missile, weapons that the Egyptians used in large numbers in the crossing of the Bar Lev line. It is estimated that the Israeli armed forces lost up to 40% of their southern armored groups during the first two days of the war, highlighting the need for infantry support to armoured groups, culminating in the Merkava main battle tanks being equipped with rear troop bays.

== Foreign military imports of tank equipment or tanks ==
=== France ===
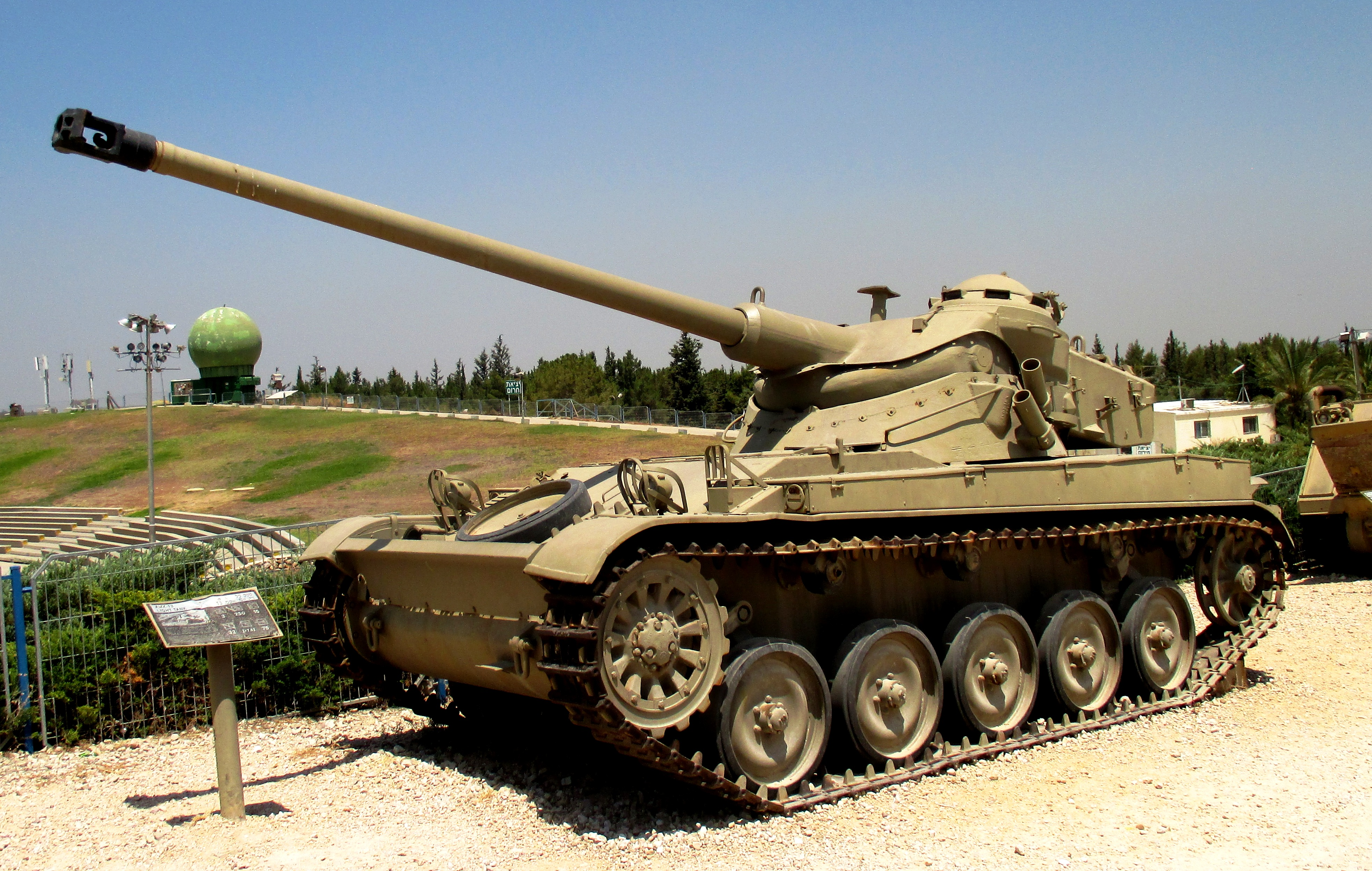
Decommissioned IDF AMX-13 tank

Starting on the Independence day on 14 May 1948 (5 Iyar 5708), a strong military, commercial and political relationship were established between France and Israel until 1969. In 1953, an Israeli delegation visited France to examine the new AMX 13 light tank. The tank was armed with the high-velocity 75 mm gun CN 75-50, a development of the German 7.5 cm KwK 42 L/70 (used in the Panther tank). While the gun was satisfactory, the armor of the French tank was considered too light. Eventually, Israel did purchase the AMX 13; however in a parallel development, it was decided to graft the powerful French gun onto the available, familiar and better-armored hull of the American M4 Sherman, as the standard tank of the IDF armored units in the early 1950s.

The highest level of the military collaboration was reached between 1956 and 1966. At this time France provided almost all the tanks along with aircraft and military ships. In 1969 the French president Charles de Gaulle limited the export of weapons to Israel. This was the end of the "golden age" 20 years of relations between Israel and France.

=== Germany ===
The Israeli Merkava MK IV tank uses a German V12 engine produced under license.

=== United Kingdom ===
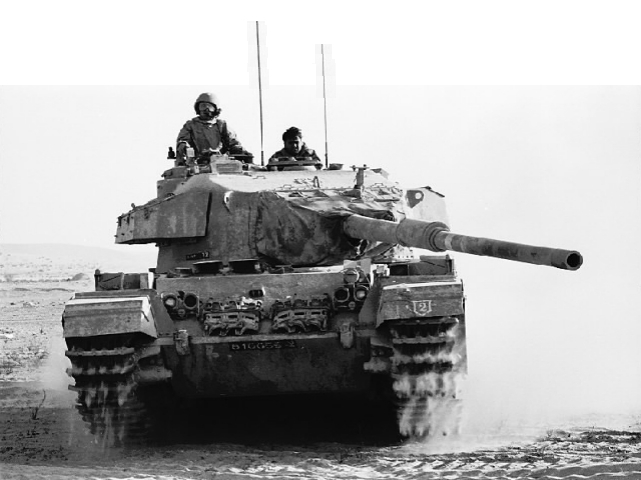
An Israeli Centurion tank operating in the Sinai

After the British withdrew, they left behind some equipment, including Bren Gun Carriers ( a common name describing a family of light-armoured tracked vehicles built by Vickers-Armstrong), that was utilized by the Israelis. Bren Gun Carriers were usually used for transporting personnel and equipment, mostly support weapons, or as machine gun platforms and is the most-produced armoured fighting vehicle in history.

The British-made Centurion Main Battle Tank was a commercial, as well as a military, success. The Centurion was perhaps the first tank to face itself in a shooting war. Egypt, Iraq, and Israel bought Centurions and used them against one another in the 1967 and 1973 Arab-Israeli wars. Some feel the reason that Israeli Centurions defeated the Arab T-55's and even T-62's is because the Centurion has good sights and the Arab tanks were downgrades of the original design, as the T-55 used by the Soviet and Warsaw pact Armies had 200mm armor thickness while T-55's sold to the Arabs had only 120mm frontal armor and mediocre side and rear armor.

=== United States ===
Operation Nickel Grass was an overt strategic airlift and operation conducted by the United States to deliver weapons and supplies to Israel during the 1973 Yom Kippur War. In a series of events that took place over 32 days, the Military Airlift Command of the U.S. Air Force shipped 22,325 tons of tanks, artillery, ammunition, and supplies in C-141 Starlifter and C-5 Galaxy transport aircraft between October 14 and November 14, 1973. The U.S. support helped ensure that Israel survived a coordinated and surprise life-threatening attack from the Soviet-backed Arab Republic of Egypt and Syrian Arab Republic.

As of 2010, the U.S. military maintained two classified, pre-positioned War Reserve Stocks in Israel valued at US$493 million.

Since 1976, Israel had been the largest annual recipient of U.S. foreign assistance. In 2009, Israel received $2.55 billion in Foreign Military Financing (FMF) grants from the Department of Defense. All but 26% of this military aid is for the purchase of military hardware from American companies only.

== Overview per tank ==
(Only tanks that were built/used in significant numbers are listed.)

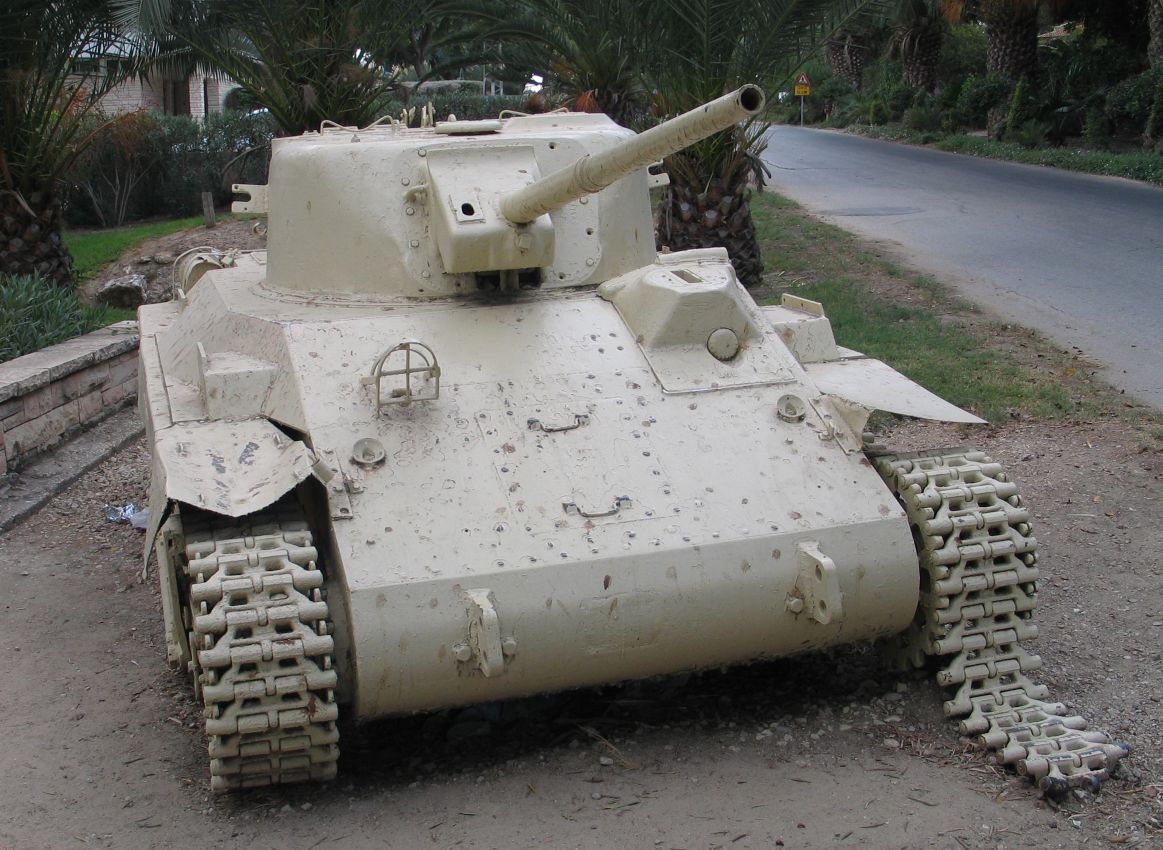
Israeli M22 Locust tank in Negba, Israel

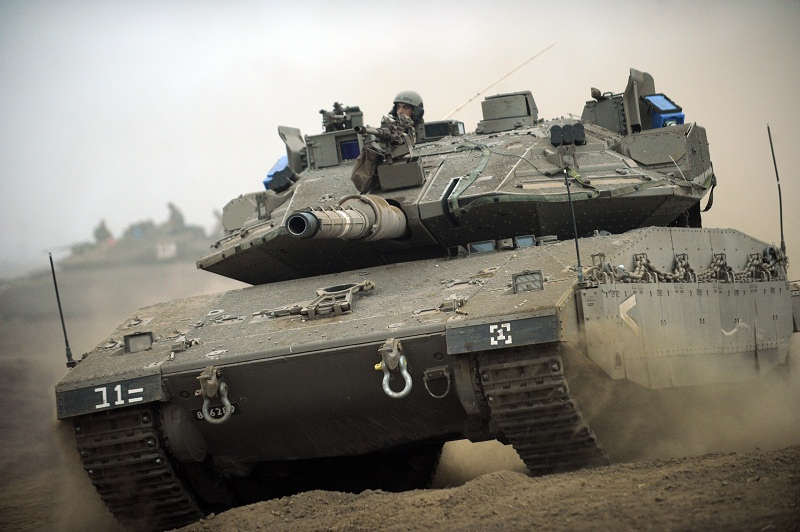
Merkava IV during a training day held in the Golan Heights for the 401st Armored Brigade

M22 Locust – An American-designed airmobile light tank

M4 Sherman – (Medium Tank, M4)

Centurion tank (A41) –British main battle tank of the post-World War II period. Israel purchased the Centurion in the late 1950s and in IDF service it was named the Shot (Whip). Its excellent armour, mobility and firepower made it the preferred choice and many tanks were purchased well into the 1960s. All were upgraded with the Royal Ordnance L-7 105mm gun during the late 1960s and from 1970 were fitted with the US Continental diesel engine and transmission. The upgraded tanks were known as the Shot-Kal, and this upgrade was later used by other Centurion operators. The tanks saw action in the 1967 and 1973 Wars, after the battle for the Golan Heights in 1973, the Shot-Kal was dubbed "The Tank That Saved Israel". After the 1973 war the Shot-Kal was fitted with Blazer reactive armour which pre-detonated incoming missiles and grenades with HEAT warheads. The tanks saw action again in the 1982 incursion into Lebanon. Many tanks were later converted to other use including the Puma Armoured Engineer Vehicle, Nagmashot, Nagmachon and Nakpadon heavy APC's.

Hotchkiss H35 – French light infantry tank, a char d'accompagnement.

Hotchkiss H39 – Upgrade of the H35 French light tank

Magach (M48/M60) – (מגח; Ma-GAKH) designation refers to a series of tanks in Israeli service. The tanks are based on the American M48 and M60 Patton tanks. Magach 1, 2, 3, and 5 are based on M48 tanks; Magach 6 and 7 are based on M60 tanks. Israel needed tanks to defend her borders from the Arab states and the American M48 tank was the best choice at the time.

AMX-13 – The AMX-13 Light Tank was designed to a new post-World War 2 French Army requirement, and France supplied them to the IDF.

M48 (Patton) – The M48 "Patton" first generation main battle tank (MBT) was supplied to the IDF by the United States.

M60 (Patton) – The M60 "Patton" Main Battle Tank was supplied to the IDF by several countries including the United States and was used in the Yom Kippur war.

Merkava (Chariot) – The Merkava (Hebrew: מרכבה, "chariot") is a main battle tank used by the Israel Defense Forces. The tank began development in 1973 and entered official service in 1979. Four main versions of the tank have been deployed. It was first used extensively in the 1982 Lebanon War. The name "Merkava" was derived from the IDF's initial development program name.

Sho't – The Sho't (meaning "Whip" in Hebrew) is the Israeli designation of the 105 mm L7 armed Centurion tank, which entered Israeli service in 1970.

- Sho't Meteor – Centurion tanks with the original Rolls-Royce Meteor engine.
- Sho't Kal Alef/Bet/Gimel/Dalet – modernised Centurion tanks with a new powerpack (the Continental AVDS-1790-2A diesel engine and the Allison CD850-6 transmission).

The addition "Kal" refers to the abbreviation of the engine manufacturer "Continental", originally notated in Hebrew as שוטקל, which reads "Sho'tCal". But since Cal also means "lightweight" and the ק is closer to K than C, the name Sho't Kal struck on outside the Hebrew speaking world.

Entered service in 1970; by 1974 all Israeli Centurions were upgraded to Sho't Kal. Subvariants indicate upgrades received by Sho't Kal tanks during their operational life, including a new turret rotating mechanism, a new gun stabilizer, a new fire-control system and preparations for the installation of the Blazer Reactive armour. Both versions of the Centurion tank, were upgraded to the 105 mm L7 gun.

=== Armor Corps ===
The Armored Corps is the principal maneuvering corps, and primarily bases its strength on Main Battle Tanks.

- Armor Corps
  - 7th Sa'ar Armored Brigade
  - 188th Barak Armored Brigade
  - 401st Ikvot HaBarzel Armored Brigade
  - 460th Bnei Or Armored Brigade

== See also ==
- Arab–Israeli conflict
- Defense industry of Israel
- Israeli security forces
- Israeli wars
- Israeli–Palestinian conflict
- Military equipment of Israel
- Military history of Israel
- Military operations conducted by the Israel Defense Forces
