= José Esteban Muñoz =

Cuban American academic (1967–2013)

- Born: August 9, 1967; Havana, Cuba
- Died: December 3, 2013 (46 years old); New York City, U.S.
- Education: Sarah Lawrence College (BA); Duke University (PhD)
- Occupation: Academic
- Known for: Queer theory, race and affect studies, performance studies, ephemera, queer utopia
- Notable work: Cruising Utopia (2009)

José Esteban Muñoz (August 9, 1967 – December 3, 2013) was a Cuban American academic in the fields of performance studies, visual culture, queer theory, cultural studies, and critical theory.

His first book, Disidentifications: Queers of Color and the Performance of Politics (1999) examines the performance, activism, and survival of queer people of color through the optics of performance studies. His second book, Cruising Utopia: the Then and There of Queer Futurity, was published by NYU Press in 2009. In 2020, the book that Muñoz was working on at the time of his death, The Sense of Brown: Ethnicity, Affect and Performance, was published by Duke University after Joshua Chambers-Letson and Tavia Nyong'o finished the manuscript Muñoz left behind. In this book, Muñoz describes the term “Brownness”, used to describe experiences and cultural practices of Brown people. He not only explains this term, but he also relates it back to the queer community, expanding on his past work on queer theory. He relates these topics together, advocating for a mode of resistance against the negative experiences presented by societal norms.

Muñoz was Professor in, and former chair of, the Department of Performance Studies at New York University's Tisch School of the Arts. Muñoz was the recipient of the Duke Endowment Fellowship (1989) and the Penn State University Fellowship (1997). He was also affiliated with the Modern Language Association, American Studies Association, and the College Art Association.

== Biography ==
Muñoz was born in Havana, Cuba, in 1967, shortly before relocating with his parents to the Cuban exile enclave of Hialeah, Florida, the same year. He earned a B.A. in Comparative Literature at Sarah Lawrence College in 1989. In 1994, he earned a doctorate from the Graduate Program in Literature at Duke University, where he studied under queer theorist Eve Kosofsky Sedgwick.

He wrote about artists, performers, and cultural figures including Vaginal Davis, Nao Bustamante, Carmelita Tropicana, Isaac Julien, Jorge Ignacio Cortiñas, Kevin Aviance, James Schuyler, Richard Fung, Basquiat, Pedro Zamora, and Andy Warhol. His work is indebted to the work of Chicana feminists: Gloria Anzaldúa, Cherríe Moraga, Chela Sandoval, and Norma Alarcón, members of the Frankfurt School of critical thinkers such as Ernst Bloch, Theodor Adorno, and Walter Benjamin, and the philosophy of Martin Heidegger.

Muñoz died in New York City in December 2013 of apparent heart failure.

== Books ==
At the time of his death, Muñoz was working on what would have been his third book, The Sense of Brown: Ethnicity, Affect and Performance, to be published by Duke University Press. In addition to his two single authored books, Muñoz co-edited the books Pop Out: Queer Warhol (1996) with Jennifer Doyle and Jonathan Flatley and Everynight Life: Culture and Dance in Latin/o America (1997) with Celeste Fraser Delgado.

Along with Ann Pellegrini, José Muñoz was the founding series editor for NYU Press's influential Sexual Cultures book series, which premiered in 1998. Grounded in women of color feminism, the series specializes in titles "that offer alternative mappings of queer life in which questions of race, class, gender, temporality, religion, and region are as central as sexuality" and was foundational to the establishment of queer of color critique.

Muñoz also worked on the initial Crossing Borders Conference in 1996, which focused on Latin America and Latino queer sexualities. He was a board member of CUNY's CLAGS: The Center for LGBTQ Studies and editor of the Journal Social Text and Women and Performance.

== Legacy ==
Shortly after his death, CLAGS instituted an award in his honor, given to LGBTQ activists who integrate Queer studies into their work. The inaugural recipient of the award was Janet Mock in 2015.

In the Spring of 2016, the Department of Performance Studies at New York University inaugurated the distinguished José Esteban Muñoz Memorial Lecture; speakers have included Fred Moten, José Quiroga, and Judith Butler.

== Research and areas of interest ==
Muñoz challenges and questions contemporary mainstream gay and lesbian politics. He argues that present gay and lesbian politics, whose political goal is gay rights, same-sex marriage, and gays in the military, are trapped within the limiting normative time and present. Following Ernst Bloch's The Principle of Hope, Muñoz is interested in the socially symbolic dimension of certain aesthetic processes that promote political idealism. Muñoz re-articulates queerness as something "not yet here." Queerness "is that thing that lets us feel that this world is not enough." Muñoz reconceptualizes queerness from identity politics and brings it into the field of aesthetics. For Muñoz, queer aesthetics, such as the visual artwork of Vaginal Davis, offer a blueprint to map future social relations. Queerness, in Muñoz's conceptualization, is a rejection of "straight time", the "here and now" and an insistence on the "then and there." Muñoz proposes the concept of "disidentificatory performances," as acts of transgression and creation, by which racial and sexual minorities, or minoritarian subjects articulate the truth about cultural hegemony. Muñoz critiques Lee Edelman's book "No Future" and the concept of queer death drive that results in Muñoz theorization of queer futurity or queer sociality. Queer futurity thus "illuminates a landscape of possibility for minoritarian subjects through the aesthetic-strategies for surviving and imagining utopian modes of being in the world."

=== Ephemera as evidence ===
Muñoz first introduced his concept of ephemera as evidence in the 1996 issue of Women & Performance: A Journal of Feminist Theory. The idea that performance is ephemeral is essential to the field of performance studies. In this essay, Muñoz claims that ephemera does not disappear. Ephemera in the Muñozian sense, is a modality of "anti-rigor" and "anti-evidence" that reformulates understandings of materiality. Building on Raymond Williams' concept of "structures of feeling", Muñoz claims that the ephemeral, "traces, glimmers, residues, and specks of things," is distinctly material, though not always solid. Framing the performative as both an intellectual and discursive event, he begins by defining queerness as a possibility, a modality of the social and the relational, a sense of self-knowing. He argues that queerness is passed on surreptitiously due to the fact that the trace of queerness often leaves the queer subject vulnerable to attack. Muñoz's definition of ephemera is influenced by Paul Gilroy's The Black Atlantic "as part of the exchange of ephemera that connects and makes concert a community." As a result, Muñoz states, queerness has not been able to exist as "visible evidence" rather it has had to exist in fleeting moments. Thus, queer performances stand as evidence of queer possibilities and queer worldmaking. Muñoz understands Marlon Riggs' documentary films Tongues Untied and Black Is, Black Ain't as examples of an ephemeral witnessing of Black queer identity. In 2013, Muñoz was a collaborator on the exhibit, An Unhappy Archive at Les Complices in Zurich. The goal of the exhibit was to question the normative definition of happiness through the use of texts, posters, books, and drawings. The title of the project is a reference to Sara Ahmed's concept of the "unhappy archive." According to Ahmed, the unhappy archive is a collective project rooted in feminist-queer and anti-racist politics. Other collaborators include Ann Cvetkovich, Karin Michalski, Sabian Baumann, Eve Kosofsky Sedgwick. Muñoz departs from Peggy Phelan's argument that the ontology of performance lies in its disappearance. Muñoz parts from this view as it is confined to a narrow view of time. He suggests live performance exists ephemerally, then without completely disappearing after it vanishes.

=== Disidentification ===
Muñoz's theory of disidentification builds on Michel Pêcheux's understanding of disidentification and subject formation by examining how minoritarian subjects whose identities render them a minority (e.g. queer people of color), negotiate identity in a majoritarian world that punishes and attempts to erase the existence of those who do not fit the normative subject (i.e. heterosexual, cisgender, white, middle class, male). Muñoz notes how queer people of color, as a result of the effects of colonialism, have been placed outside dominant racial and sexual ideology, namely white normativity and heteronormativity. In his own words, "disidentification is about managing and negotiating historical trauma and systemic violence." The disidentificatory subject does not assimilate (identify) nor reject (counter identify) dominant ideology. Rather, the disidentificatory subject employs a third strategy, and, "tactically and simultaneously works on, with, and against, a cultural form." Aside from being a process of identification, disidentification is also a survival strategy. Through disidentification, the disidentifying subject is able to rework the cultural codes of the mainstream to read themselves into the mainstream, a simultaneous insertion and subversion. By the mode of disidentification, queer subjects are directed towards the future. Through the use of shame and "misrecognition through failed interpellation, queer collectivity neither assimilates nor strictly opposes the dominant regime," but works on strategies that result in queer counterpublics.

Thinking alongside Muñoz, Roderick Ferguson and other Queer of Color Critique scholars took up the methods offered in Disidentifications: Queers of Color and the Performance of Politics to posit more complex modes of relation between majoritarian and minoritarian culture. Disidentification encapsulates an array of ideas surrounding the strategic performance of minoritarian identity that may not always appear to be in simple opposition to majoritarian culture. Described by Muñoz, “Disidentification is meant to be descriptive of the survival strategies the minority subject practices in order to negotiate a phobic majoritarian public sphere that continuously elides or punishes the existence of subjects who do not conform to the phantasm of normative citizenship.” Disidentifications uses a performance studies approach to analyzing queer of color social formation that resists state power. In the context of a performance, the performer employs the dominant narrative's construction of minoritized identity in order to reconstruct and transform dominant logics tied to the subjugated identity, in order to produce the self as liberated from the confines of marginalization. Muñoz's disidentification theory set the groundwork for subsequent queer of color critique, especially in the realm of performance studies.

His theory of disidentification is foundational to understandings of queer of color performance art and has proved indispensable across a wide variety of disciplines. Muñoz's argument is in conversation with Stefan Brecht's theory of "queer theater." Brecht argues that queer theater inevitably turns into humor and passive repetition, ultimately falling apart. Muñoz is wary of Brecht's theory, as it doesn't seem to consider the work of artists of color and also ignores the use of humor as a didactic and political project. Muñoz argues that the work of queer artists of color is political and will remain political as long as the logic of dominant ideology exists.

=== Counterpublics ===
In Disidentifications, drawing from Nancy Fraser's notion of "counterpublics," which she states "contest the exclusionary norms of the 'official' bourgeois public sphere, elaborating alternative styles of political behavior and alternative forms of speech," Muñoz defines his own invocation of counterpublics as "communities and relational chains of resistance that contest the dominant public sphere." Counterpublics have the capacity of world-making through a series of cultural performances that disidentify with the normative scripts of whiteness, heteronormativity, and misogyny. Counterpublics disrupt social scripts and create through their work an opening of possibility for other visions of the world that map different, utopian social relations. Muñoz suggests that such work is vital for queer people of color subjects survival and possibilities for another world. At the center of counterpublic performances is the idea of educated hope, "which is both critical affect and methodology." Jack Halberstam in the book In a Queer Time & Place, discusses the role of drag king culture as a form of counterpublics that validate and produce "minoritarian public spheres" at the same time they challenge white heteronormativity. Examples of counterpublics includes visual performances like Xandra Ibarra "La Chica Boom" spictacles, Vaginal Davis, and Cuban activist and The Real World: San Francisco cast-member Pedro Zamora.

=== Queer futurity and optimism ===
Queer futurity is a literary and queer cultural theory that combines elements of utopianism, historicism, speech act theory, and political idealism in order to critique the present and current dilemmas faced by queer people of color, but also to revise, interrogate, and re-examine the death drive in queer theory. Queer futurity or "queer sociability" addresses themes and concerns of minoritarian subjects through a performance and aesthetics lens, encompassing a range of media and artists with a shared interest in envisioning queer futures that stem from minoritarian subject experiences. The study of queer sociability has expanded beyond the fields of Performance Studies, Queer Theory, and Gender and Women's Studies and has been used by various scholars to address issues of Black Diaspora Studies, Caribbean Studies, and musicology, and has also led to the field of queer of color critique.

In Cruising Utopia, José Muñoz develops a critical methodology of hope to question the present and open up the future. He draws on Ernst Bloch's Marxist inspired analysis of hope, temporality, and utopia, and looks at "inspirational moments from the past in order to (re)imagine the future." In the book, Muñoz revisits a series of queer art works from the past to envision the political potentiality within them. He draws on the queer work of Frank O'Hara, Andy Warhol, Fred Herko, LeRoi Jones, Ray Johnson, Jill Johnston, Jack Smith, James Schulyer, Elizabeth Bishop and Samuel Delany's and Eileen Myles queer memoirs of the 60s and 70s. Muñoz develops a hermeneutics of "trace and residue to read the mattering of these works, their influence and world-making capacity." This world-making capacity allows for a queer futurity. Muñoz develops an argument for queerness as horizon, hope, and futurity. According to Fred Moten, "Jose's queerness is a utopian project whose temporal dimensionality is manifest not only as projection into the future but also as projection of a certain futurity into and onto the present and the past."

=== Chusma ===
Muñoz theorizes chusmeria or chusma as a form of behavior that is in excess of normative comportment. Chusmeria is "a form of behavior that refuses bourgeois comportment and suggests Latinos should not be too black, too poor, or too sexual, among other characteristics that exceed normativity." Queer theorist Deborah Vargas uses chusmeria to inform her theory of lo sucio, "the dirty, nasty, and filthy" of society. In the Muñozian sense, "lo sucio" persistently lingers as the "yet to be".

=== Sense of feeling brown ===
Muñoz began to theorize on brown affect in his piece "Feeling Brown: Ethnicity and Affect" in Ricardo Bracho's The Sweetest Hangover (and Other STDs). In this article, Muñoz wanted to focus on ethnicity, affect, and performance in order to question the U.S. national affect and highlight the affective struggles that keep minoritarian subjects from accessing normative identity politics. Muñoz's undertaking was to move beyond notions of ethnicity as "what people are" and instead understand it as a performative "what people do." Muñoz describes how race and ethnicity are to be understood as "affective" differences. Affective differences are the "ways in which different historically coherent groups 'feel' differently and navigate the material world on a different emotional register." In the piece "Feeling Brown", Muñoz discussed the notion of racial performativity as a form of political doing based on the recognition of the effects of race. Thus, "feeling brown" is a modality of recognizing the affective particularities coded to specific historical subjects, like the term Latina. He emphasized that Brown feelings "are not individualized affective particularity" but rather is a collective mapping of self and others. The turn from identity to affect resulted in Muñoz's conceptualization of the "Brown Commons" as the key point in which race is experienced as a feeling, as an affective specificity. Licia Fiol-Matta describes Jose's "Cubanity" as a "disidentity, a feeling brown, part of a brown undercommons and as an artistic manifestation of the sense of brown." With Latinidad as an affective difference, "José gave us a road map or toolkit to point us in the direction of the gap, wound, or hole of displacement as a necessary condition for interpretation to take place."

=== The Brown Commons ===
The Brown Commons is a conceptual framework that explores how individuals, particularly those racialized as “brown,” come together to form communities of shared affect, experience, history, and survival outside of dominant cultural norms. It is not tied to a specific ethnicity or a fixed identity but instead reflects a collective space where those who experience racialization or marginalization find belonging through shared struggles, desires, and expressions of being. In The Sense of Brown Muñoz explains what the brown commons is through the motif of the nightclub Aztlantis in Ricardo Bracho's play, The Sweetest Hangover. As opposed to normative nightclubs, where the ideals of the dominant society are reinforced through the music, food, dress, and people in attendance, Aztlantis is a gay nightclub where “freaks” come to gather. Although Aztlantis pays homage to a lost Chicano homeland, the club is not codified as strictly Latino, as other people of color are frequently in attendance. Additionally, the nightclub isn't only open for men; people of various genders and sexualities are often in attendance. This nightclub is codified into the brown commons and demonstrates that the entire physical space is also included in the creation of alternative spaces, or of the brown commons, that function in opposition to the dominant society's norms, standards, and expectations. To this extent, humans, places, things, animals, nature, and inanimate objects can all be conceptualized as “brown” because of their mutual relativity towards a common experience or history, or their orientation and connection to a common place and experience, such as in Aztlantis.

==== Brownness and the Undercommons ====
Muñoz states that this framework is influenced by the black radical tradition, specifically citing the “undercommons” as developed by Fred Moten and Stefano Harney in their collection of published essays, The Undercommons: Fugitive Planning & Black Study. The term “undercommons” refers to spaces of subversion and fugitivity, where marginalized individuals- particularly Black and Brown people- create new forms of solidarity and collective existence that is inherently contradictory to the normative organization, culture, and values of the dominant society. The Western value system upholds individualism, democratic governance, capitalism and privatization, privacy, and a hard work ethic. Moten and Harney argue that each of these values is inherently contradictory to the values of the undercommons: collectivity and solidarity, fugitivity and resistance, care and improvisation, ambiguity, refusal of governance, professionalization and commodification, and ongoing study and radical learning.

The “logistics” of dominant organizing forces in the society- such as debt, education, work/professionalization- are structured to isolate the individual from the collective, so that each of these spaces becomes more privatized and hyper-individualized. To this extent, anyone who does not fit within the framework is ostracized and marginalized, and their lived and historical experiences are equally marginalized unless able to organize them within the prescribed frameworks of the dominant society. To this extent, Moten and Harney argue that these shared experiences of marginalization and dispossession foster a radical sense of belonging outside the structures of institutionalized power. The undercommons becomes a site of “fugitive planning,” where individuals work collaboratively and in improvised, non-official manners- like in the kitchens, back porches, basements, halls, park benches, parties- in ways that reject capitalist productivity and the commodification and professionalization of knowledge.

The undercommons challenge the values of the dominant society because they function in a way that challenges its fundamental values of individualism, hierarchy, governance, and consumption. The undercommons seeks to disrupt the systems that perpetrate marginalization by creating a framework from which marginalized people can thrive, not in opposition to the dominant system, but entirely outside of its framework. This is again exemplified by Muñoz's nightclub motif; although the nightclub is contradictory to society's dominant value systems, it also operates entirely outside of the frameworks prescribed by that same system. It is a new space, unregulated and uncontrolled by the society that has created the need for it.

As much as Brownness is a state of being that can be reclaimed or inflicted onto someone/thing, or both at once, the Brown Commons also serves as a place of resistance and persistence, where those who have been racialized as brown are devalued outside of their community, within their commons, their brownness is used as a strength to reaffirm their own value within the world, and to contradict mainstream narratives espoused by the dominant culture about their own culture.

As much as someone can be made brown, they can also claim their brownness- their agency- through a direct confrontation against the dominant culture's values and frameworks.

== "Chico, What Does It Feel Like to Be a Problem?" ==
In The Sense of Brown, the chapter "Chico, What Does It Feel Like to Be a Problem? The Transmission of Brownness", Muñoz describes the feeling of being a problem as feeling apart and separate. He also discusses Du Bois's theory which suggests that "feeling like a problem is also a mode of belonging, a belonging through recognition". Muñoz describes Du Bois’ theory of feeling like a problem as a way in which minorities are recognized. He focuses on the way in which Brown people have always felt like a problem, not because they are one, but because that is the way in which they are categorized. He relates this feeling of being a problem to describing how there are issues when using "identity" to describe Latinos/as since there are those who do not adhere to the lines presented by society. He presents this concept that "feeling brown" can provide a common ground to temporarily get rid of these problematic terms, and it is his "attempt to frame the particularity of the group identification" displacing these terms.

Muñoz presents “brownness” not so much as a category, but rather as a “racially minoritized affect, a commons, or a modality”. He uses this term as an attempt to modify this problem that is presented by the term "latinidad", where he describes that this term does not consider the difference cultures, customs, beliefs different “Latin” people have. Instead, it groups all people from Latin America into one category that cannot accurately describe everyone. This brownness opens "onto alternative futures, shared worlds that cannot be fully grasped within the racist, heteronormative limitations of present understanding". Muñoz argues that acknowledging the problem with identities imposed by societal structures is the first step toward changing these issues. He writes that only when there is an owning of "the negation that is brownness", then there can be an "understanding of self and group as a problem in relation to a dominant order". Once this negation of brownness is achieved, then there can be this common identity between Latinos/as.

Muñoz explains that the concept of “brownness” often leads to a condition described as “feeling like a problem”, stemming from societal norms that marginalize those identified with this term. This brownness, "through its multiple and various marginalizations, is used to consolidate a racialized implicitly white norm". Consequently, individuals associated with brownness are compelled to seek alternative means to reconcile their identity with societal expectations. They strive to find methods that are “pleasurable, ethical and indeed tolerable” to adapt to these norms.

== Influence and impact ==
After his death, a special issue of the journal Boundary 2, themed "The Beauty of José Esteban Muñoz", was published. The journal featured pieces from various scholars influenced by Muñoz, including Juana María Rodríguez, Fred Moten, Daphne Brooks, Elizabeth Freeman, Jack Halberstam, and Ann Cvetkovich. The issue covered themes related to Muñoz's contribution to various academic fields such as queer of color critique, affect studies, and the new ways to conceptualize concepts such as Latina/o identity, queer ephemera, and temporality. After Muñoz's death, various art, literary, and academic institutions, artists, and periodicals, commemorated his legacy and contributions through a series of online and journal based obituaries and memorial lectures and annual events. In the special edition of Boundary 2, Ann Cvetkovich credits Muñoz for the explosion and morphing of the field of affect theory as a result of Jose's work. Deborah Paredez describes Muñoz as key to the practice of a critical and ethical attentiveness to a wide range of performances by Latina/o artists and for helping scholars listen to the melody of what it is like to feel brown.

In 2014, Muñoz's concept of ephemera as evidence was the theme for a Visual AIDS exhibit, curated by Joshua Lubin-Levy and Ricardo Montez. The exhibit took its name from Muñoz's 1996 essay, Ephemera as Evidence: Introductory Notes to Queer Acts. Featuring visual art, performance art, and pedagogical projects, Ephemera as Evidence explores how the HIV/AIDS crisis forged new relationships of temporality. The exhibit, which ran from June 5 to June 24 at La Mama Galleria, featured works from Nao Bustamante, Carmelita Tropicana, Benjamin Fredrickson, and more.

Muñoz's disidentification theory has also influenced other thinkers in the field. In Crip Theory: Cultural Signs of Queerness and Disability, Robert McRuer, draws on Muñoz's theory of disidentification to articulate and imagine "collective disidentifications" made possible when putting queer and crip theory in conversation. Diana Taylor, Ann Cvetkovich, Roderick Ferguson, and Jack Halberstam have cited and applied Muñoz to their own work. Muñoz was also influential in the field of Queer of Color Critique. In the book Aberrations in Black, Roderick Ferguson employs Muñoz's disidentification theory to reveal how the discourses of sexuality are used to articulate theories of racial difference in the field of sociology. Moreover, disidentification theory has been used by an array of scholars to apply a queer of color critique to various themes such as identity politics, temporality, homonationalism, and diaspora and native studies.

In 2014, the art collective, My Barbarian, was selected to participate in "Alternate Endings", a video program put on by Visual AIDS, for the 25th anniversary of Day With(out) Art. Begun in 1989, the annual event is meant to commemorate the AIDS crisis and give artists a platform to display work that reflects and responds to the history of HIV/AIDS. Titled, "Counterpublicity", the video performance is based on Muñoz's essay on Pedro Zamora. In the embodied performance, the three artists recreate scenes from The Real World: San Francisco in an exaggerated manner, critically examining the politics of reality television. Lyrics for the piece were adapted from Muñoz's theory of counterpublic spheres. In a panel, My Barbarian said, "the video is a remembrance within a remembrance: to Pedro Zamora and to José Esteban Muñoz." The video premiered at Outfest in Los Angeles.

Xandra Ibarra, La Chica Boom's use of "spics" is influenced by Muñoz's Sense of Brown and Counterpublics. For Muñoz, spics are epithets linked to questions of affect and excess affect. Ibarra's performances of "la Virgensota Jota" and "La tortillera" are ways to re-inhabit toxic languages for the purpose of remapping the social or what Muñoz described as disidentificatory performances. Muñoz has a seminal influence on many American scholars and artists, among them Robert McRuer, Roderick Ferguson, Daphne Brooks, Nadia Ellis, Juana María Rodríguez, Deborah Paredez, and Ann Cvetkovich.

== Publications ==
=== Books ===
- Disidentifications: Queers of Color and the Performance of Politics (1999). Minneapolis: University of Minnesota Press. ISBN 978-0-8166-3015-8.
- Cruising Utopia: The Then and There of Queer Futurity (2009). New York: NYU Press. ISBN 978-1-4798-7456-9. Translated to Spanish (Utopía queer, Caja Negra, 2020), French (Cruiser l'utopie, Les Presses du Réel, 2021) and Italian (Cruising Utopia. L'orizzonte della futurità queer, NERO, 2022).
- The Sense of Brown (2020). Durham, NC: Duke University Press. ISBN 978-1-4780-1103-3.

=== Edited books ===
- With Celeste Fraser Delgado. Everynight Life: Culture and Dance in Latin/o America. Durham: Duke University Press, 1997.
- With Jennifer Doyle and Jonathan Flatley. Pop Out: Queer Warhol. Durham: Duke University Press, 1996.

=== Book chapters ===
- "The Future in the Present: Sexual Avant-Gardes and the Performance of Utopia." The Future of American Studies. Eds. Donald Pease and Robyn Weigman. Durham and London: Duke University Press, 2002.
- "Gesture, Ephemera and Queer Feeling: Approaching Kevin Aviance." in _Dancing Desires: Choreographing Sexuality On and Off the Stage_ Ed. Jane Desmond. (Madison: University of Wisconsin Press, 2001.
- "The Autoethnographic Performance: Reading Richard Fung's Queer Hybridity." Performing Hybridity. Eds. Jennifer Natalya Fink and May Joseph. Minneapolis: University of Minnesota Press, 1999.
- "Latino Theatre and Queer Theory." Queer Theatre. Ed. Alisa Solomon. New York: New York University Press, 1999.
- "Luis Alfar's Memory Theatre." Corpus Delecti. Ed. Coco Fusco. New York and London: Routledge, 1999.
- "Pedro Zamora's Real World of Counterpublicity: Performing an Ethics of the Self." Living Color: Race and Television. Ed. Sasha Torres. Durham and London: Duke University Press, 1998.
- "Rough Boy Trade: Queer Desire/Straight Identity in the Photography of Larry Clark." The Passionate Camera. Ed. Deborah Bright. New York: Routledge, 1998.
- "Photographies of Mourning: Ambivalence and Melancholia in Mapplethorpe (Edited by Van Der Zee) and Looking for Langston." Race and the Subject(s) of Masculinity. Eds. Harry Uebel and Michael Stecopoulos. Durham and London: Duke University Press, 1997.
- "Famous and Dandy Like B. 'n' Andy: Race, Pop, and Basquiat." Pop Out: Queer Warhol. Eds. Jennifer Doyle, Jonathan Flatley and José Esteban Muñoz. Durham and London: Duke University Press, 1996.
- "Flaming Latinas: Ela Troyano's Carmelita Tropicana: Your Kunst Is Your Waffen." The Ethnic Eye: Latino Media. Eds. Ana M. López and Chon A. Noriega. Minneapolis: University of Minnesota Press, 1996.
- "Ghosts of Public Sex: Utopian Longings, Queer Memories." Policing Public Sex: Queer Politics and the Future of AIDS Activism. Ed. Dangerous Bedfellows. Boston: South End Press, 1996.

=== Selected journal articles ===
- "The Queer Social Text," Social Text 100 Vol 27, No. 3 (Fall 2009): 215–218.
- "From Surface to Depth, between Psychoanalysis and Affect," Women and Performance: A Journal of Feminist Theory. Vol. 19, No 2 (July 2009): 123–129.
- "Hope and Hopelessness: A Dialogue," with Lisa Duggan, Women and Performance: A Journal of Feminist Theory. Vol. 19, No 2 (July 2009): 275–283.
- "The Vulnerability Artist: Nao Bustamate and the Sad Beauty of Reparation," Women and Performance: A Journal of Feminist Theory, Vol. 16, No. 2, (July 2006): 191–200.
- "Feeling Brown, Feeling Down: Latina Affect, the Performativity of Race, and the Depressive Position," Signs: Journal of Women in Culture and Society, Vol. 31, No 3 (2006): 675–688.
- "What's Queer about Queer Studies Now," with David. L. Eng and Judith Halberstam in Social Text: What's Queer about Queer Studies Now? ed. with David L. Eng and Judith Halberstam, Vol. 23, Nos. 84-86 (Fall/Winter 2005): 1–18.
- "My Own Private Latin America: The Politics and Poetics of Trade," (with John Emil Vincent), Dispositio/n 50 (Spring 1998 [2000]), 19–36.
- "Ephemera as Evidence: Introductory Notes to Queer Acts," Women and Performance, A Journal of Feminist Theory, eds. José E. Muñoz and Amanda Barrett, Vol. 8, No. 2 (1996): 5–18.
