= All Incomplete =

2021 collection of essays

- Author: Stefano Harney and Fred Moten
- Language: English
- Genre: Social theory
- Publisher: Minor Compositions
- Publication date: 2021
- ISBN: 978-1-57027-378-0

All Incomplete is a 2021 collection of essays by Stefano Harney and Fred Moten, published by Minor Compositions. Drawing on the Black radical tradition, the book develops concepts first introduced in The Undercommons (2013), including study, debt, collectivity, and property. All Incomplete continues the exploration of social life that cannot be contained within institutional structures. Unlike The Undercommons, which received attention for its discussion of academic labor and the University as a site of struggle, All Incomplete reflects a broader application of Moten and Harney's ideas, as the authors respond to the global reception of their work amongst activists, students, and artists.

The book was released simultaneously in print and as a freely downloadable open access edition.

== Contents and themes ==
All Incomplete mixes poetry and critical theory. Fred Moten and Stefano Harney write collaboratively and are known for experimenting with improvisation, surrealism, paradox, and relational poetics.

Moten and Harney make sustained references to a range of voices from literature, music, history, and continental philosophy, including: Édouard Glissant, Nathaniel Mackey, Hortense Spillers, Amiri Baraka, Saidiya Hartman, Amilcar Cabral, Denise Ferreira da Silva, Cedric Robinson, Walter Rodney, General Baker, George Clinton, Jacques Derrida, Karl Marx, Gilles Deleuze, Félix Guattari.

Stefano Harney and Fred Moten

In an interview with Stevphen Shukaitis, the authors describe All Incomplete as a "peripatetic book of influences and circumstances, and sharedness." The integration of these many influences and circumstances into their writing is a kind of study of the Black radical tradition, as Harney and Moten try to critically explore the poetic sensibilities in theoretical writings and the theoretical implications of works of poetry. In this sense, the form of All Incomplete is a refusal of traditional notions of individuality--which Moten and Harney see as complicit in racial capitalism--as well as a performance of the collective social life that exists beyond institutions first described in The Undercommons.

All Incomplete was published in 2021 by Minor Compositions. The book includes a foreward by Denise Ferreira da Silva, 15 interconnected essays by Harney and Moten, and an afterward by Zun Lee.

== Collaboration with Zun Lee ==
All Incomplete features photography by Zun Lee. The collaboration began after the authors saw similarities between Lee's work at the Bronx Documentary Center and their ongoing study of the Black radical tradition.

Lee's photography explores themes of storytelling, captivity, enjoyment, blackness, and alternative family structures.

Collaborating directly with a visual artist marks a departure from The Undercommons, which does not include photography.
