= The Negro Family: The Case For National Action =

1965 report on Black poverty in the United States

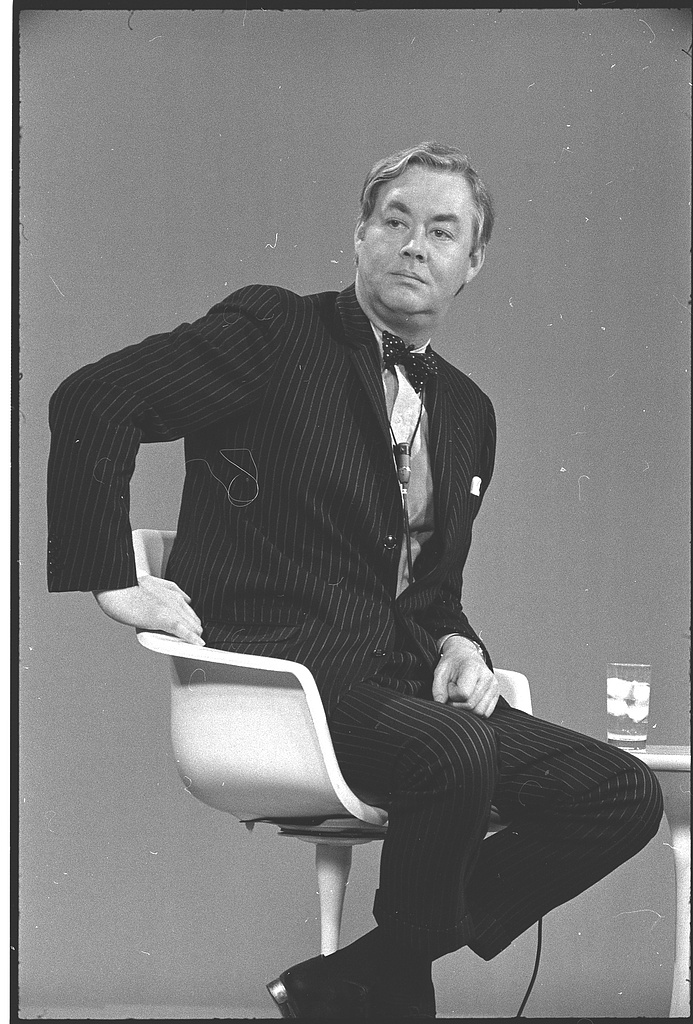
Daniel Patrick Moynihan in 1969

The Negro Family: The Case For National Action, commonly known as the Moynihan Report, was a 1965 report on Black poverty in the United States written by Daniel Patrick Moynihan, an American scholar serving as Assistant Secretary of Labor under President Lyndon B. Johnson, and a future US Senator from New York. Moynihan argued that the rise in black single-mother families was caused not by a lack of jobs for men, but by a destructive vein in ghetto culture, which could be traced back to the slavery era and the subsequent racial discrimination in the American South under Jim Crow laws.

In the 1930s, Black sociologist E. Franklin Frazier initiated what would become the mainstream view that economic and social conditions had shaped Negro family characteristics. Moynihan was considered one of the first academicians to challenge conventional social-science wisdom about the roots of persistent African-American poverty and its connection to family life. As he later wrote, "The work began in the most orthodox setting, the US Department of Labor, to establish at some level of statistical conciseness what 'everyone knew': that economic conditions determine social conditions. Whereupon, it turned out that what everyone knew was evidently not so." The Moynihan Report asserted that the high rate of families headed by single mothers would greatly hinder progress of Blacks toward economic and political equality. The report was criticized by liberals at the time of publication, and its conclusions remain controversial.

== Background ==
While writing The Negro Family: The Case For National Action, Moynihan was employed in a political appointee position at the US Department of Labor. He had been hired to help develop policy for the Johnson administration in its War on Poverty. In the course of analyzing statistics related to Black poverty, Moynihan noticed something unusual: Rates of Black male unemployment and welfare enrollment, instead of running parallel as they always had, started to diverge in 1962 in a way that would come to be called "Moynihan's scissors."

When Moynihan published the report in March 1965, the out-of-wedlock birthrate among Blacks was 25 percent, much higher than that of whites.

== Contents ==
In the report's preface, Moynihan writes:

The gap between the Negro and most other groups in American society is widening. The fundamental problem, in which this is most clearly the case, is that of family structure. The evidence—not final, but powerfully persuasive—is that the Negro family in the urban ghettos is crumbling. A middle-class group has managed to save itself, but for vast numbers of the unskilled, poorly educated city working class the fabric of conventional social relationships has all but disintegrated."

He goes on to say that the collapse of the nuclear family in the black lower class would preserve the gap between the possibilities for Negroes and that of other ethnic groups. He acknowledges the continued existence of racism and discrimination within society, despite the victories that blacks had recently won through civil rights legislation. He concludes, "The steady expansion of...public assistance programs in general, can be taken as a measure of the steady disintegration of the Negro family structure over the past generation in the United States."

To remedy the problem, Moynihan recommends large-scale programs for jobs, education, and vocational training for the Black community. Sociologists Douglas Massey and Robert Sampson would later note that in the context of the War on Poverty, the report made "an impassioned moral case for a massive federal intervention to break the cycle of black poverty and put African Americans on the road to socioeconomic achievement and integration into American society."

In 1998, S. Craig Watkins summarized Moynihan's findings as follows:

The report concluded that the structure of family life in the Black community constituted a "tangle of pathology... capable of perpetuating itself without assistance from the white world," and that "at the heart of the deterioration of the fabric of Negro society is the deterioration of the Negro family. It is the fundamental source of the weakness of the Negro community at the present time." Also, the report argued that the matriarchal structure of Black culture weakened the ability of Black men to function as authority figures. That particular notion of Black familial life has become a widespread, if not dominant, paradigm for comprehending the social and economic disintegration of late 20th-century Black urban life.

== Influence ==
External videos
- Discussion with Moynihan about The Negro Family on Meet the Press, December 12, 1965

The Moynihan Report generated considerable controversy and has had long-lasting influence. Writing to Lyndon Johnson, Moynihan argued that without access to jobs and the means to contribute meaningful financial support to a family, Black men would become systematically alienated from their roles as husbands and fathers, which would cause rates of divorce, child abandonment, and out-of-wedlock births to skyrocket in the Black community (a trend that had already begun by the mid-1960s), leading to vast increases in the numbers of households headed by females.

In 2009, historian Sam Tanenhaus wrote that Moynihan's fights with the New Left over the report were a signal that Great Society liberalism had political challengers both from the right and from the left.

== Reception and following debate ==
From the time of its publication, the report has been sharply rebuked by civil rights groups and leaders such as the NAACP, Jesse Jackson, and Al Sharpton for exemplifying racism, cultural bias, and white patronizing. Critics accused Moynihan of relying on stereotypes of the Black family and Black men, implying that Blacks had inferior academic performance, portraying crime and pathology as endemic to the Black community, and failing to recognize that cultural bias in standardized tests had contributed to apparent lower achievement by Blacks in school.

The report was attacked for threatening to undermine the place of civil rights on the national agenda, leaving "a vacuum that could be filled with a politics that blamed Blacks for their own troubles." In an October 1965 speech, Martin Luther King Jr. referred to the Moynihan Report as a "recent study" which claimed that "the Negro family in the urban ghettos is crumbling and disintegrating." King worried that some people would attribute this "social catastrophe" to "innate Negro weaknesses" that could then be "used to justify neglect and rationalize oppression."

In 1987, Hortense Spillers, a Black woman academic, criticized the report on semantic grounds for its use of the terms "matriarchy" and "patriarchy" when describing the African-American family. She argued that those terms, while useful when defining white families, did not apply in the same way to African-American families because of the legacy of slavery.

In his 2003 book Aberrations in Black, Roderick Ferguson noted how Black nationalists had resisted the report's suggestion that the state should, in essence, bolster Black men's masculinity by providing economic assistance. Ferguson argued that the Moynihan Report generated hegemonic narratives about minority communities and nationalist sentiments in the Black community. Ferguson's analysis of the report informed his own Queer of Color Critique.

African-American libertarian economist Walter E. Williams lauded the report for its findings. He said, "The solutions to the major problems that confront many Black people won't be found in the political arena, especially not in Washington or state capitols." Thomas Sowell, another African-American libertarian economist, praised the report on several occasions, beginning with his 1975 book Race and Economics. In 1998, he stated that Moynihan may have written "the last honest government report on race." In 2015, Sowell asserted that time had proven Moynihan's core idea correct that African-American poverty was less a result of racism and more a result of single-parent families: "One key fact that keeps getting ignored is that the poverty rate among Black married couples has been in single digits every year since 1994."

In a 2008 article in National Review, conservative political commentator Heather Mac Donald wrote: "Conservatives of all stripes routinely praise Daniel Patrick Moynihan's prescience for warning in 1965 that the breakdown of the black family threatened the achievement of racial equality. They rightly blast those liberals who denounced Moynihan's report."

Sociologist Stephen Steinberg argued in 2011 that the Moynihan report was condemned "because it threatened to derail the Black liberation movement."

=== Attempting to divert responsibility ===
Psychologist William Ryan coined the phrase "blaming the victim" in his 1971 book of the same name. He was specifically attacking the Moynihan Report, calling it an attempt to divert responsibility for poverty from social structural factors to the behaviors and cultural patterns of the poor.

=== Feminist critique ===
Some scholars contend that the report presents a "male-centric" view of social problems, arguing that Moynihan failed to take into account basic rational incentives for marriage, He was faulted for not acknowledging how women had historically engaged in marriage in part out of a need for material well-being since adequate wages for women working outside the home were denied by cultural traditions. With the expansion of welfare in the US in the mid to late 20th century, women gained greater access to government resources intended to reduce family and child poverty. Women also increasingly gained access to the workplace. As a result, more women were able to subsist independently when men had difficulty finding work.

=== Counter-response ===
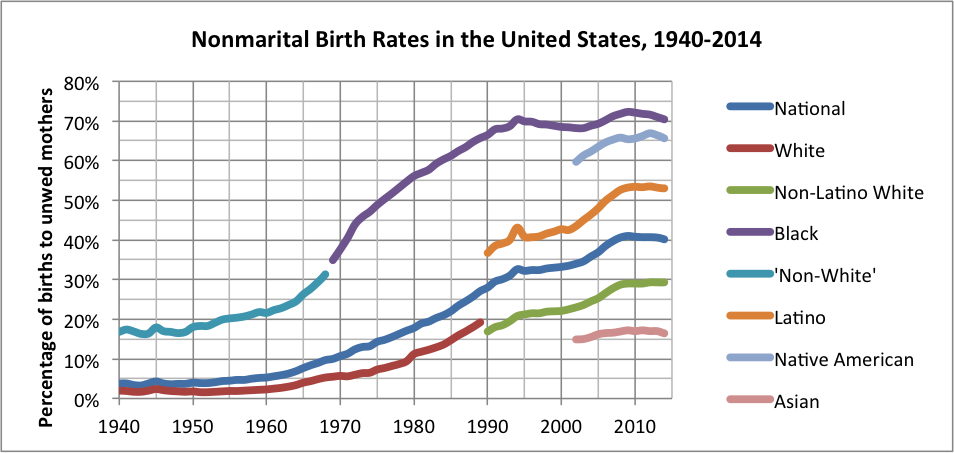
Out-of-wedlock birth rates by race in the United States from 1940–2014. Rate for African Americans is the purple line. Data is from the National Vital Statistics System Reports published by the CDC National Center for Health Statistics. Note: Prior to 1969, African American illegitimacy was included along with other minority groups as "Non-White."

Declaring Moynihan "prophetic," Ken Auletta, in his 1982 The Underclass, proclaimed that "one cannot talk about poverty in America, or about the underclass, without talking about the weakening family structure of the poor." Both the Baltimore Sun and the New York Times ran a series on the Black family in 1983, followed by a 1985 Newsweek article called "Moynihan: I Told You So." In 1986, CBS aired the documentary The Vanishing Family, hosted by Bill Moyers, a onetime aide to President Johnson, which affirmed Moynihan's findings.

In a 2001 interview with PBS, Moynihan said:

My view is we had stumbled onto a major social change in the circumstances of post-modern society. It was not long ago in this past century that an anthropologist working in London – a very famous man at the time, Malinowski – postulated what he called the first rule of anthropology: That in all known societies, all male children have an acknowledged male parent. That's what we found out everywhere… And well, maybe it's not true anymore. Human societies change.

By the time of that interview, rates of the number of children born to single mothers had gone up in the white and Hispanic working classes as well. In November 2016, the Current Population Survey of the United States Census Bureau reported that 69 percent of children under the age of 18 lived with two parents, which was a decline from 88 percent in 1960, while the percentage of U.S. children under 18 living with one parent increased from 9 percent (8 percent with mothers, 1 percent with fathers) to 27 percent (23 percent with mothers, 4 percent with fathers).

== See also ==
- African-American family structure
- Black matriarchy
- Fragile Families and Child Wellbeing Study
- Is Marriage for White People?
- Losing Ground
- William Julius Wilson
