= Obstetric racism =

Racism experienced during pregnancy

Obstetric racism is the racism experienced by people in pregnancy, childbirth and the postpartum period. The term was coined by medical anthropologist Dána Ain-Davis, which she defines as "the intersection of obstetric violence and medical racism". Studies suggest that race, class, and ethnicity all contribute significantly to occurrences of obstetric violence. A CDC analysis from 2023 found that 40% of Black women report discrimination or obstetric violence compared to 19% of white women. In a shadow report created for the UN Committee on the Elimination of Racial Discrimination, surveys found that Black women die in child birth at a rate three to four times higher than white women, and have since the 1970s.

Obstetric violence encompasses many forms of discrimination and improper care, and can extend beyond the physical act of childbirth into more general reproductive health issues. Obstetric racism has been shown to greatly influence instances of obstetric violence against women of color. In addition, the general quality of reproductive healthcare women of color receive is worse, and they will often get less accurate information or care because of their race. Women in southern countries such as Mississippi, or in states with high Black populations such as Washington D.C. reported receiving worse care than white peers and fearing the quality of care they would receive at hospitals which are well-known for their discrimination. Anthropologist Dána Ain-Davis' definition of obstetric racism cites a few examples and the ways in which it can show up in healthcare. She describes instances of dehumanizing treatment, medical abuse, birth rape, or other bodily violations experienced during childbirth or the process of carrying a child that can all be considered acts of obstetric racism.

Dána Ain-Davis characterizes obstetric racism as an intersection between many different forms of discrimination. The medical racism experienced by many Black people compounded with gendered discrimination experienced by women results in damaging standards of care for Black women during childbearing.

== Historical instances ==
Obstetric racism has a long and global history. Some of the earliest recorded cases of extreme obstetric violence occurred at the height of slavery in the US. Enslaved women were often forced to have children in a practice called "slave breeding" in order to produce more workers. Black women were also often used in medical experimentation, particularly in the field of gynecology. White doctors oversaw enslaved Black women's pregnancies and used them as a way to practice care and try new treatments, meaning enslaved women often experienced extreme cases of obstetric violence because of their race and position in society. Dr. James Marion Sims was a physician in the early 19th century who was known for his operations and experimentation on Black women in the field of gynecology. Due to the lack of rights awarded to enslaved people, particularly children, Sims was free to operate on young enslaved women and girls, only needing permission from the child's "owner". Sims, along with other 19th century doctors, believed that Black women experienced less pain that white women, and as a consequence they often operated without anesthetic or pain management. The disparity of care quality among races is still a prevalent issue, a study found that there are statistically significant differences in the quality of care given to Black vs white patients.

in Mexico during the early 20th century, a male student of obstetrics named Gustavo Adolfo Trangay developed a theory about the size of the female pelvis. He reasoned that if a woman's pelvis was small, she was unfit to be mother. The idea was based off of similar phrenology theories circulating at the time regarding Black people's intelligence and the alleged smaller size of their skulls. Trangay thought that biology had predetermined which women should bear children by giving them a smaller or larger pelvis. Using this logic, Trangay justified the illegal sterilization of Mexican women based on eugenics. The student never served jail time, despite a strict prohibition of sterilization by the Mexican government in 1931, the same year he performed them on women at a public hospital in Mexico City.

Puerto Rico has a complicated history of eugenics and forced sterilization intertwined with obstetric racism. Since the US acquisition of the island in 1898, there has been an effort to decrease the Puerto Rican population. In 1899, the US government determined via census that there was an overpopulation issue on the island, though the number was less than a million. Between the 1930s and 1970s, the Puerto Rican government sponsored the sterilization of thousands of women, the highest number in the history of the world. The sterilizations were performed on women between the ages of 20 and 49, and it resulted in the sterilization of 1/3 of Puerto Rican women, meaning almost 1/3 of the Puerto Rican population is sterilized currently. When Franklin D. Roosevelt was elected as President of the United States in 1933, he was open about his concern of overpopulation in Puerto Rico. Only 4 years after his election, in 1937, Law 116 was passed under his presidency, resulting in the creation of the Puerto Rican Eugenics Board. The board's purpose was to regulate and enforce sterilization and eugenic laws on the island. The law also legalized surgical sterilization, although they had been performed since the early 1930s. Even before Law 116 was passed, Roosevelt was promoting sterilization as a viable solution for the population control issue in Puerto Rico. The solution was adopted quickly, and by 1978 a poll found that 7% of women had been sterilized already. Only 5 years later, in 1953, another poll found that the number had more than doubled at 16%.

In 1955, health services for Native Americans were delegated under the Public Health Service (PHS), a division of the Department of Health, Education, and Welfare. The PHS created a subdivision which was later renamed the Indian Health Service. The IHS took an interest in Native American reproduction after a 1970 census found that Native American women were giving birth at almost double the rate of the median of all other groups in the US. Following the census between the years of 1973 and 1976, the government performed nearly 3,500 sterilizations. These procedures were later investigated by the Government Accounting Office for occurring under suspicious circumstances. After regulations were passed to control the performance of sterilization, the GAO was concerned that proper consent procedures were not being followed prior to the sterilizations. The investigation returned inconclusive, but still resulted in the passing of the Indian Health Care Improvement Act, which awarded Native American tribes the authority to manage their own Indian Health Service programs.

== Legal cases ==
In 1974, Alice and Minnie Relf were sterilized at 12 and 14. They were two young Black girls living in the south, and their mother was unable to read and write. She was told that her daughters would be given birth control shots, when in reality they were surgically sterilized without their knowledge or consent. Afterwards, the Southern Poverty Law Center filed a lawsuit on behalf of the sisters and won, subsequently exposing the rampant practice of sterilization of Black women and girls that was happening on behalf of the U.S. government. The lawsuit discovered that government officials had been threatening women on welfare with a loss of privileges if they did not comply with the procedure, and using government money to fund the sterilizations. Due to the lawsuit Relf v. Weinberg, doctors now have to obtain informed consent before practicing on patients.

The 1978 court case Madrigal v. Quilligan was filed for a similar reason. 10 Mexican American women filed a class action lawsuit against the Los Angeles County Medical Center. During the 1970s, there was a rise in sterilizations of Mexican women, particularly among those who had minimal English proficiency. At the time, California had the highest rate of sterilization in the country. . Among the 10 women who filed the lawsuit was Dolores Madrigal, who claimed that she had been coerced into getting sterilized while in active labor. An employee at the hospital exposed the malpractice and discrimination of the hospital against low-income women of color, releasing testimonies of the doctors admitting to the mistreatment. The case was argued on the basis of Roe v. Wade, which had been passed only five years prior. The judge ruled in the defendants favor, claiming that the sterilizations happened because of unintentional miscommunication and blamed the patients' minimal English proficiency.

These are two several important examples among many legal cases of obstetric racism. A lot of these are from the civil rights era or the suffrage movement, but there are numerous recent cases as well. As recently as 2022, the husband of a Black woman sued a Los Angeles hospital for allowing her to die in a brain bleed due to what he termed a "culture of racism."

== Obstetric racism in the 21st century ==
Obstetric racism has proven to have deadly consequences. There have been countless cases of deaths or severe/life-long injury that have come from instances of obstetric racism. The case of Adriana Smith in Georgia is a prime example of some of the consequences of obstetric racism. Smith, a 30 year old woman living in Atlanta, Georgia, came to Emory University Hospital with reports of severe headaches in February of 2024. Smith had blood work done, but was not given a full neurological workup, and she was eventually sent home. She returned to the hospital soon after with worsening pain and difficulty breathing. Shortly after that, Smith was declared brain dead and transferred to Emory University Hospital Midtown while 9 weeks pregnant with a fetus. For the next 110 days, Smith was kept on life support at the hospital while receiving imaging on the fetus. The fetus was delivered in an emergency cesarean-section at 24 weeks and survived, though remained in the hospital for more than six months after his delivery. The case is often cited regarding discussions of abortion law, but many argue that it also serves as a prime example of obstetric racism.

According to the CDC website, roughly 1 in 3 women of color report mistreatment during the childbearing process, making obstetric racism a global and prevalent issue. They reported the most common types of mistreatment as: receiving no response and request for help, being shouted at or scolded, not having their physical privacy protected, and being threatened with withholding treatment or made to accept unwanted treatment. This report was published in 2023, and obstetric racism continues to happen in hospitals across the world, often making national headlines, like the case of Adriana Smith.
