= Jean-Paul Martinon =

American philosopher

Jean-Paul Martinon (born 1963) is an American philosopher. Martinon is currently Reader in Visual Cultures at Goldsmiths, University of London.

== Life and education ==
Martinon was born in Chicago, Illinois, USA. He studied international relations at the Institute of Higher International Studies where he obtained an MA in 1988. He obtained his PhD at the University of Reading in 2001. Martinon was appointed a lecturer at Goldsmiths College in 2001, becoming Reader in 2013.

== Writing ==
Martinon's philosophical work centres on ethics, time and temporality. It includes explorations of futurity in the work of Jean-Luc Nancy, Jacques Derrida and Catherine Malabou, (On Futurity) and the relationship between masculinity and time mainly referencing the work of Emmanuel Levinas (The End of Man). His essays cover a wide range of contemporary topics from issues of race and universality, to the birth of language, the prohibition of murder, and the role of intuition in the work of Karl Marx.

In addition, he has been closely engaged with African philosophy, especially the work of Valentin Mudimbe and contemporary Rwandan thinkers. His essays in this field focus on the potential for African thought to disrupt the hegemony of western paradigms. His monograph, After “Rwanda” is the first book of philosophy focusing on issues of ethics after the Genocide of 1994.

== Other work ==
Between 1991 and 1998, he was the curator and co-founder of the independent arts trust 'Rear Window', which staged arts events and conferences in temporary locations across London. His interest in the theory and philosophy of curating led him to co-create with Irit Rogoff the Curatorial/Knowledge PhD program at Goldsmiths, University of London.' His work in this field includes the edited collection 'The Curatorial: A Philosophy of Curating'.

== Selected publications ==
- After "Rwanda": In Search of a New Ethics (2013) (Rodopi) ISBN 9789042037113
- The Curatorial: A Philosophy of Curating (2013) (Bloomsbury) ISBN 9781472525604
- The End of Man (2013) (Punctum) ISBN 9780615766782
- On Futurity: Malabou, Nancy and Derrida (2007) (Palgrave) ISBN 9780230222977
- Swelling Grounds: A History of Hackney Workhouse (1995) (Rear Window) ISBN 0952104040
