= Performance anxiety (disambiguation) =

Performance anxiety, or stage fright, is an anxiety or phobia aroused in a person when required to perform in front of an audience.

Performance anxiety may also refer to:

- Performance Anxiety (film), a 2008 film by Paul Dangerfield
- Performance Anxieties, a published work by Dr. Ann Pellegrini
- Sexual performance anxiety, a type of sexual dysfunction
