= Shaka McGlotten =

American social anthropologist

- Occupation: Writer, professor
- Education: University of Texas at Austin
- Notable works: Dragging: In the Drag of a Queer Life; Black Genders and Sexualities (with Dána-Ain Davis); Zombie Sexuality: Essays on Sex and the Living Dead (with Steve Jones); Virtual Intimacies: Media, Affect, and Queer Sociality

Website
- www.purchase.edu/live/profiles/460-shaka-mcglotten

Shaka McGlotten is a social anthropologist and Professor of Media Studies at the State University of New York at Purchase, where they have also served as the chair of Gender Studies and Global Black Studies since 2017. McGlotten's work reflects an interest in critically examining two strains of feminist thinking: feminist science and technology studies and affect theory.

== Early life and education ==
McGlotten was born in Willingboro Township, New Jersey, and moved to Germany as a young child. Their father, Clifford McGlotten, was in the U.S. Army and the family traveled extensively as a result. The 1980s were spent between San Antonio, TX, and various cities in Germany, including Nürnberg, Berlin, and Frankfurt. They received their B.A. studio art from Grinnell College in 1997, before going on to receive their Ph.D. in Social Anthropology from the University of Texas at Austin in 2005.

== Career ==
In 2006, they began their position as assistant professor of Media Studies at Purchase College. A year later, they contributed a chapter titled "Virtual Intimacies" for David Phillips and Kate O'Riordan's collection, Queer Online: Media Technology and Sexuality. McGlotten continued writing numerous chapters and articles before publishing their first book, Virtual Intimacies: Media, Affect, and Queer Sociality' in 2013. The following year, the collection, Zombies and Sexuality: Essays on Desire and the Living Dead (co-edited with Steve Jones) was published. Their second book, Dragging: In the Drag of a Queer Life, which takes an ethnographic approach in documenting the influence of drag on several artists and activists, was published in August 2021.

== Reception/awards ==
In 2014, they received the Alexander von Humboldt Foundation Fellowship for Experienced Researchers to support research for Dragging. In 2017, they were awarded the Arts Writers Grant from The Andy Warhol Foundation, and the Akademie Schloss Solitude Social Science Fellowship. In 2020, McGlotten was introduced as a Faculty Fellow for the Data & Society Research Institute.

McGlotten has also received numerous faculty awards throughout their time as a professor at Purchase College.

== Works ==
Since 2007, McGlotten has published two books, two edited volumes, and dozens of peer-reviewed journals, chapters, and online publications.

=== Black Data ===
McGlotten coined "Black data" to describe the phenomenon of (and response to) modern surveillance technology and media evolving in order to both target and exclude populations based on their racial identities. McGlotten looks to contemporary artists, researchers, policy makers, and others in order to suggest solutions to the oppression brought about by these forms of technological control.

Black data describes the opacities of technological black boxes, the violences of black sites and black ops, the revolutionary impulses embodied by anarchist black blocs, and the historical and contemporaneous ways people of African descent are subjected to forms of technological mastery (as commodities, demographic problems, or vectors of risk, for example). Simultaneously, "black data" refers to political aesthetic counter-practices, from forms of black fugitivity that seek to create alter-publics or find refuge in "the undercommons," to the reimagining of black histories, presents, and futures through the creative lens of Afrofuturism.
