= Queer of color critique =

Multi-issue approach to queer theory

Queer of color critique is an analytical framework that insists on the role of racialization in establishing normative gender and sexuality as an organizing principle of capitalism. Queer of color critique is an analytical framework that centers race, gender, sexuality, and class in its critique of politics, history, and mainstream gay rights movements. The term was first articulated in the book, Aberrations in Black: Towards a Queer of Color Critique, by Roderick A. Ferguson. Expanding on women of color feminism, queer of color critique is an analysis of race, gender, sexuality, and class in relation to liberal ideology, the nation-state, and capital. In Ferguson's words, "Queer of color analysis disidentifies with historical materialism to rethink its categories and how they might conceal the materiality of race, gender, and sexuality." Through disidentification, queer of color critique voices the silences of Marxism that inscribe heteronormativity. In critiquing liberalism, queer of color critique problematizes the single-issue orientation of gay politics and historical narratives of LGBTQ exclusion. Deployed by activists, organizers, intellectuals, artists, care workers and community members alike, queer of color critique builds an analytic for political world building.

== Historical context ==
The origins of Queer of Color Critique are traced back to a cultural studies reading group of doctoral students Roderick Ferguson, Chandan Reddy, Gayatri Gopinath, Grace Hong, Danny Weidner, Victor Viesca, Victor Bascara, and Ruby Tapia. Ferguson, Gopinath, and Reddy questioned "what would an intersectional, queer critique of political economy look like?" after attending a talk at UC San Diego in 1999 on Martin Manalansan's essay, "In the Shadows of Stonewall: Examining Gay Transnational Politics and the Diasporic Dilemma." There had yet to be an established methodology that provided a global critique of homonormativity, interjecting queer political analysis into critical theory.

=== Pre-queer of color critique ===
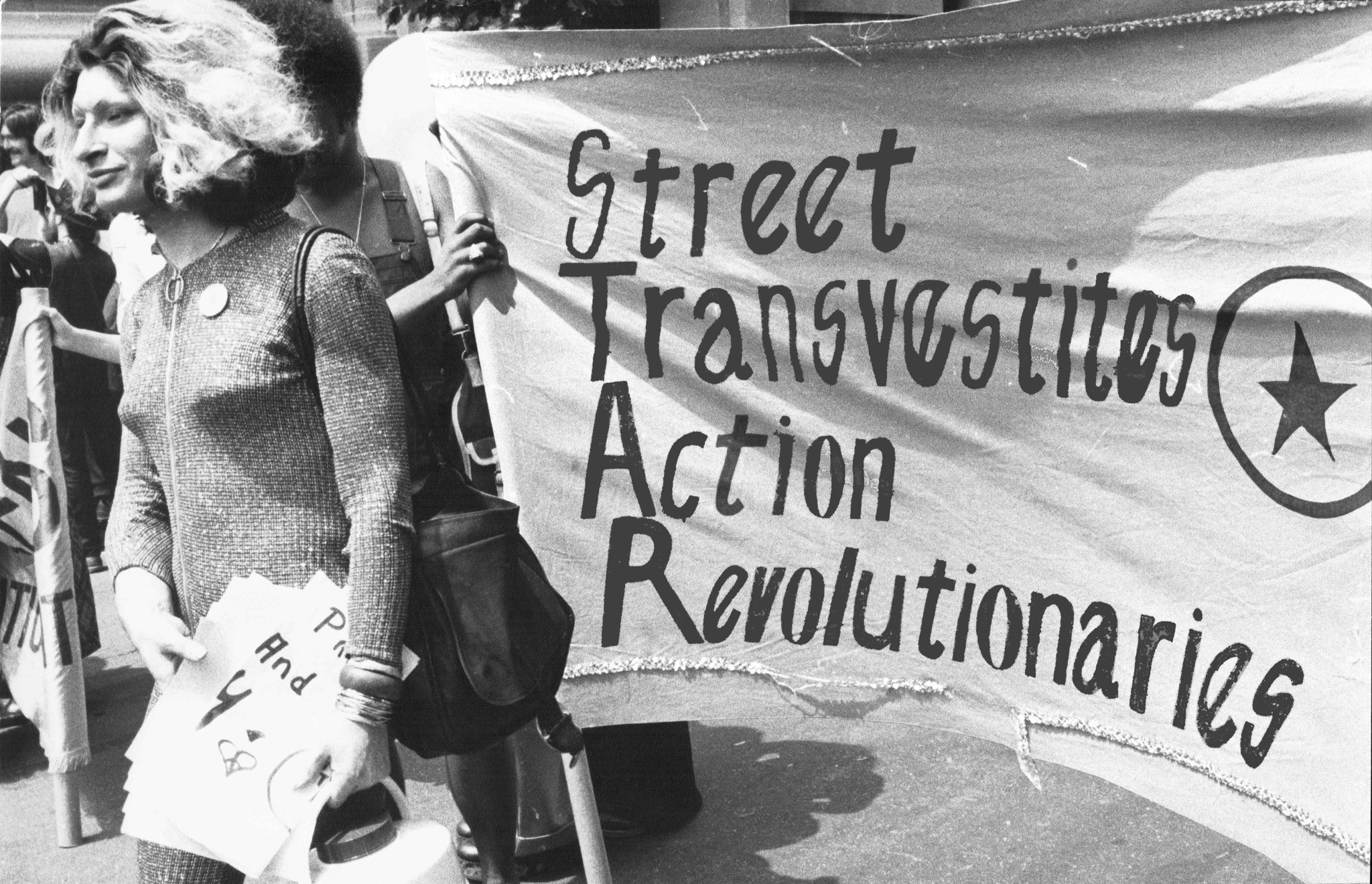
Sylvia Rivera in 1970 at S.T.A.R. Rally

The praxis for Queer of Color critique came long before the establishment of a named analytical framework. Queer and trans people of color were foundational in organizing and activating LGBTQ movements in the US. However, efforts to converge racial, class, and gender struggles within the movement for gay liberation were sidelined by those who sought an assimilative approach to gain power and capital for largely upper-middle class white gays and lesbian. Notably, figures who participated in the Stonewall uprising, like Marsha P. Johnson, Sylvia Rivera, and Miss Major Griffin-Gracy, saw gay liberation equally invested in racial and socioeconomic justice, involving themselves in housing, abolition, decriminalization of sex work, and harm reduction projects, and could be said to already be deploying a queer of color critique in their activist practices. Sylvia Rivera and Marsha P. Johnson founded the Street Transvestite Action Revolutionaries (S.T.A.R.) and found difficulty of receiving funding and support from organizations like the Gay Activists Alliance and Gay Liberation Front. For the latter half of the twentieth century, queer and trans people of color were already fighting against oppressive conditions and material circumstances resulting from intersecting vectors of oppression. The most prominent gay organizations of the 1970s, 80s, and 90s prioritized liberal rights like military inclusion and marriage equality, and were more concerned with respectability and power than empowering or materially supporting members of the community, such as transgender populations, homeless youth, sex workers, and the incarcerated.

=== Stonewall ===
Queer of Color critique was also responding to the dominant homonationalist narrative that positioned Stonewall as the catalyst event for gay rights in the Western world. As discussed in Manalansan's foundational essay, the meaning of Stonewall is problematically applied transnationally, assuming universal stakes and value of Stonewall's symbolic and political ramifications. Malansan features interviews from gay Filipino men, one of which was present at the uprising, who do not view Stonewall, the subsequent pride parades, and movement to "come out of the closet" as integral to the formation of their gay American identity and life. He writes, "For my immigrant informants who self-identify as gay, narratives of the 'closet' and 'coming out' fragment and are subordinated in relation to the more highly fraught arena of the law and citizenship." Queer of color critique contradicts the emphasis on Stonewall in U.S. gay politics that misrepresents large swaths of gay immigrants whose identities are not solely defined by sexuality, or whose views on gay identity conflict with U.S. based representations.

=== HIV/AIDS advocacy ===
Queer of Color critique was influenced by the disparities between white LGBTQ communities and queer communities of color made extremely prevalent by the HIV/AIDS crisis. In Juana María Rodríguez's Queer Latinidad: Identity Practices, Discursive Spaces, Rodriguez details the use of organizing tactics by the organization Proyecto ContraSIDA por Vida, a California-based Latinx AIDS advocacy group from the 1990s, that didn't rely on essentialized identity categories but rather creative and transformative messaging in order to save lives. Proyecto ContraSIDA moved beyond using solely gay identity as a tool for dismantling systemic oppression, using linguistic, cultural, familial, and neighborhood-based approaches. Proyecto ContraSIDA's resistance to identity politics was complicated by the organization's reliance on state funding, paradoxically requiring identity categorization or a "victimized subject" in order to stay running and establish a political force in the city. Queer of color critique uses the complications associated with intersectional organizing as grounds for analysis and theory production.

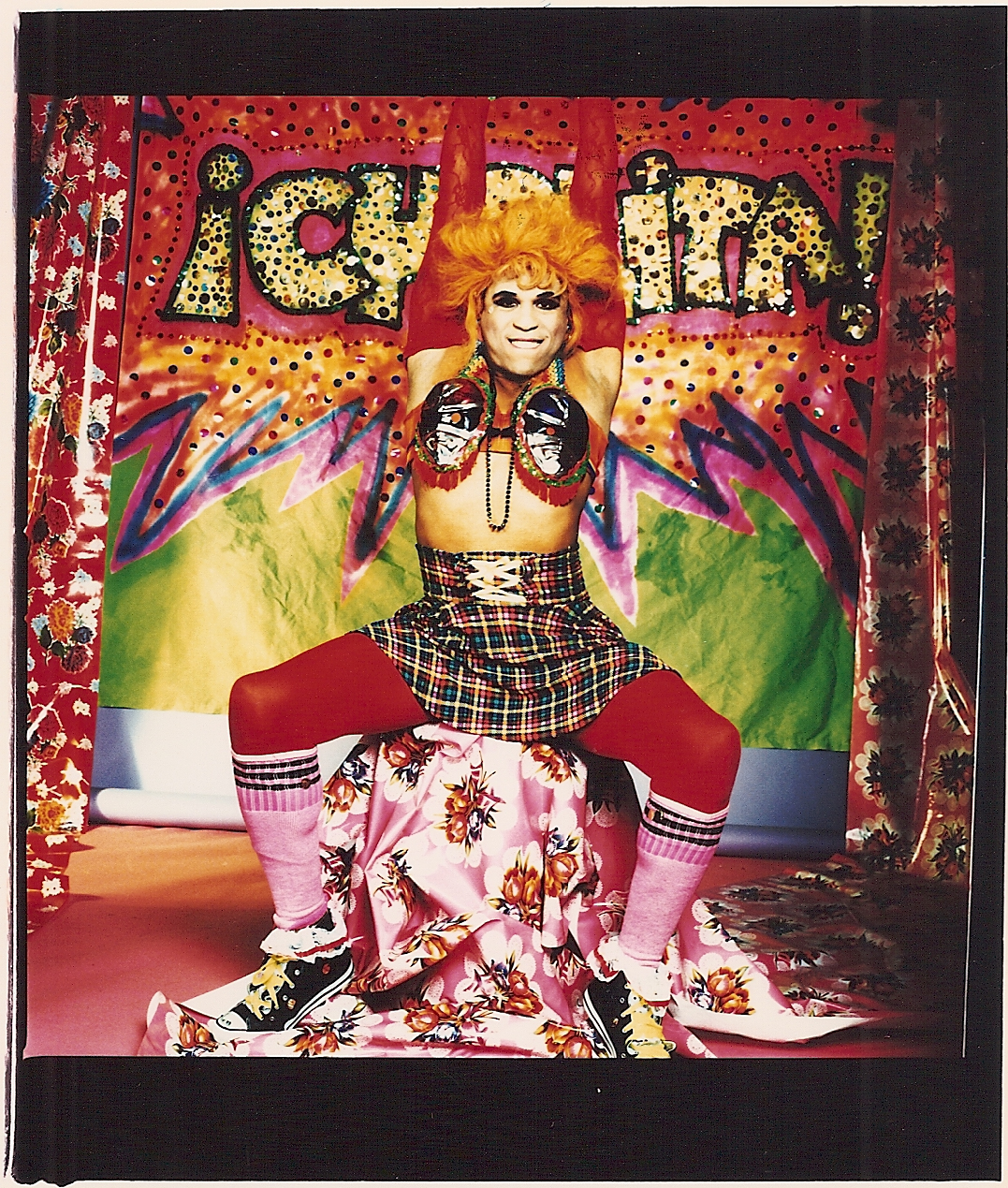
Vaginal Davis, subversive drag artist and subject of a chapter in Muñoz's Disidentifications

=== Disidentification ===
Thinking alongside the scholar José Esteban Muñoz, Ferguson and other Queer of Color Critique scholars took up the methods offered in Disidentifications: Queers of Color and the Performance of Politics (1999) to posit more complex modes of relation between majoritarian and minoritarian culture. Straddling between strategic essentialism and constructivism, Muñoz offered the concept of disidentification which became an influential analytic for Queer of Color Critique scholarship that followed. Disidentifications uses a performance studies approach to analyzing queer of color social formation that builds on scales of community formations to resist state power. Muñoz credits Gloria Anzaldúa and Cherríe Moraga as inspirations for his theory, and borrows from Kimberlé Crenshaw's framework of intersectionality. In the context of a performance, the performer employs the dominant narrative's construction of minoritized identity in order to reconstruct and transform dominant logics tied to the subjugated identity, producing the self as liberated from the confines of marginalization. Muñoz analyzed theory, political action, performance, documentaries, literature, song, and artists to formulate disidentification as a strategy for working within and against dominant structures of power. Scholars use disidentification for artistic, performance, aesthetic, and political analytics within Queer of Color critique.

== Articulations of queer of color critique ==
=== Indigeneity and diaspora ===
In the anthology, Queer Indigenous Studies: Critical Interventions in Theory, Politics, and Literature, scholar Andrea Smith presents a criticism queer of color critique while urging for a queer native studies lens. Smith asserts that Queer of Color Critique fails to contend with settler colonialism or acknowledge the existence of Native nations, undermining the sovereignty of indigenous peoples. Additionally, she writes that "in queer of color critique in particular, mestizaje and queerness often intersect to disappear indigeneity through the figure of the diasporic or hybrid queer subject." In this gap, Smith advocates for a native queer lens that both deconstructs heteronormativity within Native studies and destabilizes settler colonial logics within queer theory.

Stephanie Nohelani Teves, the author of Defiant Indigeneity: The Politics of Hawaiian Performance uses queer of color critique to explore diasporic indigeneity within the lāhui, the Hawaiian nation, queering Hawaiian indigeneity. Teves argues for an expanded understanding of Native identity that doesn't mandate persistent connection to land, but recognizes the economic and colonial forces behind displacement of Kānaka Maoli (Native Hawaiians) into the diaspora. Movement is especially prominent for queer and trans Hawaiians due to the colonial imposition of heteropatriarchy. However, diasporic movement furthers settler colonialism, which both relies on Native disappearance and benefits LGBTQ communities in the mainland, placing Native queer Hawaiians in a precarious position. As Teves explains, "mainstream American visions of LGBTQ life are [...] antithetical to the Indigenous-based forms of gender and sexuality that get squeezed into Western categories but also continue to exist outside of them."

Gayatri Gopinath explores queer of color diasporic aesthetic practices in her book Unruly Visions: The Aesthetic Practices of Queer Diaspora. Gopinath claims queer diasporic aesthetics reveal the interconnected violence and displacement of empire that affects both native and non-native racialized subjects. As Gopinath explains, "the aesthetic practices of queer diaspora constitute an alternative archive of what remains submerged within dominant epistemologies, and also demand and enact a reading practice of dominant archives that renders visible their gaps, fissures and inconsistencies." Gopinath's argument is that queer diasporic aesthetics expose and deconstruct heteronormative and homonormative nationalisms, highlighting inclusion and exclusion as simultaneous facets of the violent liberal egalitarian settler colonial nation-state. Gopinath sees queerness as an optic for problematizing history, diaspora, and social formations.

=== Identity and performance ===
Lawrence La Fountain-Stokes theorizes on formulations of Puerto Rican queer and trans identity through drag performance in his book Translocas: The Politics of Puerto Rican Drag and Trans Performance. He uses artists and cultural productions to reflect "on the uses of nonhegemonic, antihomonormative, and antitransnorma-tive queerness and of drag and trans performance for varied personal, communitarian, aesthetic, political, cultural, educational, pedagogical, and social purposes." La Fountain-Stokes grounds his theory in lived experience to render a "transloca" epistemology.

Kareem Khubchandani examines the subjectivity of South Asian migrant men within urban gay nightlife around the world using performance and queer of color critique lenses in their book, Ishstyle: Accenting Gay Indian Lifestyle. Engaging in ethnographic research, they investigate the quotidian politics of nightlife that illuminate global social formations and political scales, with a specific focus on dance. Khubdanchandani offers "Ishtyle" as a Desi accenting of style that encapsulates performed embodiments of cultural difference entrenched in geopolitics. Ishtyle a way of thinking through queering Indian-ness in space.

== Foundational influences ==
=== Gloria Anzaldua ===
Gloria Anzaldua, a Chicana lesbian author and activist, contributed to the queer of color critique by documenting and theorizing how queerness and sexuality interact with culture and language. In her book Borderlands/La Frontera: The New Mestiza, Anzaldua expands the meaning of "borders" beyond physical barriers that divide nation-states to an articulation of identity-invisible boundaries that exist inside the body. Anzaldua provides a narrative that explains "dual consciousness" of having to understand both dominant and non-dominant cultures to live in two worlds, both rejecting certain aspects of identity. She draws on this narrative in an anthology titled This Bridge Called My Back: Writings by Radical Women of Color, which she coedited with Cherrie Moraga.

== Trans of color critique ==
=== Coloniality of gender ===
One concept used by trans of color critique is the concept of gender being a colonial construct. That is, the dominant way of viewing gender as a binary between men and women has been formed because of the forces of European colonialism and racism. Scholar PJ DiPietro says "The coloniality of gender framework makes sense of a paradigmatic shift, the rendering of Native, Indigenous, and Black flesh into modified versions of 'gender'..."

== Academics ==
- Kemi Adeyemi
- Jafari S. Allen
- Tomás Almaguer
- Marquis Bey
- Arnaldo Cruz-Malavé
- Fatima El-Tayeb
- Roderick A. Ferguson
- Licia Fiol-Matta
- Gayatri Gopinath
- Nguyen Tan Hoang
- Lawrence La Fountain-Strokes
- Karen Jaime
- E. Patrick Johnson
- Kara Keeling
- Kareem Khubchandani
- Jacob Lau
- Martin Manalansan
- Juana Maria Rodriguez
- madison moore
- José Esteban Muñoz
- Tavia Nyong'o
- José Quiroga
- Chandan Reddy
- Marlon Riggs
- Ramón H. Rivera-Servera
- Fadi Saleh
- June Scudeler
- Siobhan Somerville
- Stephanie Nohelani Teves
- Urvashi Vaid
- Deborah R. Vargas
- Salvador Vidal-Ortiz
