= Dána-Ain Davis =

Dána-Ain Davis is a professor of urban studies at Queens College, City University of New York (CUNY) and the Director of the Center for the Study of Women and Society.

== Biography ==
Dána-Ain Davis was born in New York in 1958. She attended the University of Maryland, College Park to study film and communication, and graduated with her BA in 1980. Out of college, Davis worked at The Village Voice, a newspaper company based in New York that also wrote stories of culture and art. Davis also worked at WNYC-TV, a television station during her lifetime. She then ventured into the nonprofit sector working in the organizations: YWCA of the City of New York, Bronx AIDS Services, and The Village Centers for Care.

Davis returned to school for a Master of Public Health at Hunter College in the School of Health Sciences studying Community Health Education and graduating in 1994. Davis graduated with a Ph.D. in Anthropology from Graduate Center of the City University of New York in 2001.

Davis was an Assistant Professor of Anthropology at State University of New York at Purchase and an Associate Professor and Associate Chair at Queens College. She was also the Associate Chair of the Graduate Program in Urban Affairs at Queens College from 2011-2017. Davis is currently the Director of the Center for the Study of Women and Society at the Graduate Center of City University of New York.

Davis is the co-editor of Feminist Anthropology, the first journal from the Association of Feminist Anthropology (AFA). Davis is on the editorial board for Cultural Anthropology and Women's Studies Quarterly. In 2018, Davis was appointed as a Taskforce Member in Governor Cuomo's Maternal/Mortality Task Force. Dr. Davis has also served as the president of the Association of Black Anthropologists and is the co-editor of Transforming Anthropology, the journal of the Association of Black Anthropologists, with Aimee Cox.

== Works ==
Davis’ work has been influential in the field of Black feminist ethnography, medical anthropology, science and technology studies (STS), and women, gender, and sexuality studies. A symposium at Barnard College and a special issue in The Scholar and Feminist Online features Davis' book Reproductive Injustice for a discussion on medical racism, realities of birth for Black people in the USA. The special issue and salon showcase how Davis' work in conversation with others fighting for reproductive justice. Dána-Ain Davis has worked as a doula with a variety of organizations.

In Davis' first book, Battered Black Women and Welfare Reform, she describes the experiences of Black women on welfare at a women's shelter. Davis addresses the shortcomings of the welfare system. Davis focuses on how racism impacts the experiences of those on welfare and contributes to the circulation of negative stereotypes.

In Reproductive Injustice, Davis details how racism negatively impacts the reproductive outcomes of Black women in the United States via the 'afterlife of slavery' framework. The book addresses medical racism and diagnostic lapses in the context of reproductive and newborn care. Reproductive Injustice has received the Basker prize in medical anthropology, an Honorable Mention for the 2020 Victor Turner Prize in Ethnographic Writing, it was a finalist for the Association of American Publishers 2020 PROSE Award.

Davis has co-authored three texts on the theory and practice of feminist ethnography, such as Feminist Ethnography and Feminist Activist Ethnography.

Davis, and her co-author Sameena Mulla, argue for an expansion of the citational practices in medical anthropology beyond Western-centric and white scholarship, to enrich and diversify the discipline. Davis and Mulla argue that using theories and foundational texts from European and North American scholars do not give medical anthropologists the tools to understand local contexts and the meanings of wellbeing in different contexts. Davis and Mulla argue for expanding citational practices to include forms of knowledge making beyond the written text.

== Selected works ==
- Reproductive Injustice: Racism, Pregnancy, and Premature Birth. New York: New York University Press, 2019. ISBN 9781479812271.
- Black Genders and Sexualities. Edited collection, Shaka McGlotten and Dána-Ain Davis, eds. New York: Palgrave McMillan, 2012. ISBN 978-1-137-07795-0.
- Battered Black Women and Welfare Reform: Between a Rock and a Hard Place. Albany, New York: State University of New York Press, 2006. ISBN 978-0-7914-6843-2.
- Feminist Activist Ethnography: Counterpoints to Neoliberalism in North America. Edited Collection, Christa Craven & Dána-Ain Davis, eds. Lanham, Maryland: Lexington Books, 2013. ISBN 978-0-7391-7636-8.
- Feminist Ethnography: Thinking Through Methodologies, Challenges & Possibilities. Dána-Ain Davis and Crista Craven. Lanham, Maryland; Rowman & Littlefield, 2016. ISBN 978-0-7591-2244-4.
