= Kareem Khubchandani =

Researcher, performance artist, and organizer

- Other name: LaWhore Vagistan (drag name)
- Occupations: Researcher, performance artist, activist

Academic background
- Education: (Colgate University); Northwestern University
- Alma mater: Northwestern University (PhD)

Academic work
- Discipline: Performance Studies
- Sub-discipline: Queer Nightlife, South Asian Diaspora, Drag Pedagogy
- Institutions: Tufts University; University of Texas at Austin
- Main interests: Ethnography, Global Politics, Gender Discipline
- Notable works: Ishtyle: Accenting Gay Indian Nightlife (2020)
- Website: www.lawhorevagistan.com

Kareem Khubchandani is an American researcher, performance artist, and organizer. Khubchandani's research, teaching, and performance exists at the intersections between queer nightlife, global politics, ethnography, South Asian diaspora, and drag. Khubchandani performs in drag as LaWhore Vagistan, who interweaves storytelling, standup comedy, body art, theater, and digital media.

== Early life ==
Khubchandani was born in British Gibraltar to a Sindhi Hindu family. His parents later settled in Ghana, and he emigrated to Chicago, United States, at the age of 24.

== Education and work ==
Khubchandani holds a BA in sociology and anthropology from Colgate University, an MA and PhD in performance studies from Northwestern University, and was the inaugural Embrey Foundation Postdoctoral Fellow at the Center for Women's and Gender Studies at the University of Texas at Austin.

As an author, Khubchandani has been published in Scholar and Feminist Online, Transgender Studies Quarterly, Journal of Asian American Studies, The Velvet Light Trap, Theater Topics, Theatre Journal, and The Wiley Blackwell Encyclopedia of Gender and Sexuality Studies. Upcoming essays will be featured in Other Pop Empires, The Global Encyclopedia of LGBTQ History, and Oxford Encyclopedia of Gender and Sexuality Studies.

Khubchandani's first academic monograph, Ishtyle: Accenting Gay Indian Nightlife (University of Michigan Press, 2020), is a performance ethnography that examines queer social spaces in Chicago and Bangalore. Alongside Elora Chowdhury and Faith Smith, he co-curates the Feminisms Unbound roundtable series for the greater Boston area's Graduate Consortium of Women's Studies. Khubchandani has also worked for the Association for Theater in Higher Education, serving as LGBTQ Focus Group Conference Planner, and the Vice President for Advocacy.

As an activist, he has worked with TrikoneChicago, a South Asian LGBTQ organization, and with the Bangalore Campaign for Sexuality Minorities Rights.

Khubchandani serves as an Associate Professor in the Department of Theatre, Dance, and Performance Studies and the Department of Race, Colonialism, and Diaspora at Tufts University.

== Performance ==
Khubchandani performs in drag as LaWhore Vagistan, often combining performance with lecturing about queer nightlife, gender discipline, and South Asian diasporic culture. He started drag in Chicago, Illinois in 2009.

With Khubchandani's teaching, Vagistan is often featured as a guest-lecturer, allowing for an alternative, performing pedagogy, as presented by a South Asian drag queen. In one of Vagistan's performances, Lessons in Drag, she raises issues of gender discipline and explores South Asian popular culture through anecdotes, monologues, research interviews, stand-up comedy, and dance. According to Khubchandani, Vagistan's name is rooted in the image of the Indian subcontinent, Pakistan, and Afghanistan, as a vagina; it also stems from an investment in the subcontinent as being unified, undivided by colonialism or national lines. Vagistan has performed at Austin International Drag Festival, Mustard Seed South Asian Film Festival, The Asia Society, AS220, Queens Museum, Jack Theater, Bronx Academy of Arts and Dance, Not Festival, and A.R.T. Oberon.

Apart from his performances, Khubchandani's videos have been screened at the Mississauga South Asian Film Festival, Austin OUTsider Multi-Arts festival, Hyderabad Queer Film Festival, and the San Francisco 3rd i film festival.
