= Barnard Center for Research on Women =

Feminist pressure group in New York, US

- Formation: 1971
- Purpose: Feminist Research
- Director: Premilla Nadasen
- Associate Director: Margot Kotler
- Creative Director: Hope Dector
- Website: bcrw.barnard.edu

BCRW image from 40th Anniversary celebration

The Barnard Center for Research on Women (BCRW) is a nexus of feminist thought, activism, and collaboration for scholars and activists. The BCRW regularly hosts public events and creates publications and multimedia projects focusing on social transformation while supporting the work of scholars and activists. Since its founding in 1971, BCRW has promoted women's and social justice issues to its local communities at Barnard College and within New York City and beyond. It is a member organization of The National Council for Research on Women.

== History ==
The Women's Center opened in the fall of 1971. According to its founding charter, the aim of the Women's Center was, "to assure that women can live and work in dignity, autonomy, and equality ... to encourage the open sharing of knowledge and experience, it seeks to increase ties among diverse groups of women." The organization also served as a curriculum committee, collecting information on women's studies programs at Barnard, and eventually assisted with the development of a full women's studies major at the university which was approved in May 1977. Catharine R. Stimson served as the chairwomen of the task force that created the Women's Center and was its first acting director. Jane S. Gould was appointed acting director in 1972 and permanent director in 1973. Only 20 years after BCRW's founding, women's studies courses had expanded from 16 courses to more than 30,000 in the United States by 1993.

In the beginning years of the Woman's Center, it worked closely with the Office of Career Development in Barnard to support alumnae re-entering the workforce, and it has since expanded to promote social transformation and advance intersectional social justice. In February 2000, Renee Gerni took over as the director of the program to increase the Center’s accessibility to the public and to spread awareness of the resources that the Center provides to both the community and students. The director of The Women's Center in 2024 is Premilla Nadasen. Nadasen is a professor of history at Barnard and a published feminist scholar who focuses on social change. Nadasen has stated that her goals for BCRW are to maintain a space for collective thinking and action while also analyzing and expanding initiatives within a progressive movement centered on radical care.

== Activities ==
Since 1974, BCRW has hosted the annual Scholar and Feminist conference, including the 1982 Barnard Conference on Sexuality. Controversy arose surrounding the 1982 Conference after Barnard confiscated thousands of copies of Politics, Pleasure, Pain: The Controversy Continues by Judith Butler, leading to the conference being picketed by Women Against Pornography (WAP). The most recent annual Scholar and Feminist Conference was held in April 2024 and focused on Anti-Colonialism, Black Radicalism, and Transnational Feminism by exploring black feminist and third-world movements since the 1940s.

They also regularly host a speaker series featuring prominent feminist speakers. Some notable speakers include Nobel Peace (1997) Laureate Jody Williams, Angela Davis, Rinku Sen, and many more.

== Research and Publications ==
BCRW also has many publications ranging from books to blogs. A significant contribution is S&F Online, a triannual online peer-reviewed journal focusing on feminist topics. S&F Online is accessible to the public, allowing public access to research conducted by the Barnard Center for Research on Women. They have also created eleven volumes of New Feminist Solutions, each containing a publicly available comprehensive resource guide focusing on solutions to current feminist issues. The most recent issue Immigrants and Refugees are Welcome Here, is centered on immigrants and refugees and was directed by Amber Holibaugh; an LGBTQ+ activist best known for writing “My Dangerous Desires: A Queer Girl Dreaming Her Way Home." In addition to this, they have created a blog, the Dare to Use the F-word podcast, publish annual reports on their yearly accomplishments, and have an archive of past newsletters.

== Works ==
=== Books ===
- Paradoxes of Neoliberalism: Sex, Gender, and Possibilities for Justice (2022)
- Interventions: Activists and Academics Respond to Violence (2004)
- Class, Race, and Sex: The Dynamics of Control (1983)
- The Future of Difference (1987)
