= Cruising Utopia =

2009 book

Cruising Utopia: The Then and There of Queer Futurity
- Author: José Esteban Muñoz
- Subject: Queer theory
- Publisher: NYU Press
- Publication date: 2009
- Pages: 240

Cruising Utopia: The Then and There of Queer Futurity is a book in the field of queer theory by José Esteban Muñoz, published in 2009.

The writing style of the book is described as "cruising" its subject matter, moving quickly between a wide range of topics.

The book was widely praised by scholars and influential in beginning new conversations in queer theory. In non-academic venues, the Gay Times and Publishers Weekly praised the book's optimism about queer liberation and its insights into pop culture, while noting that the scholarly prose might put off casual readers. A "tenth anniversary edition" was published in 2019. In 2020 and 2021, Spanish and French translations were published.
