= Christina Crosby =

American scholar and writer (1953–2021)

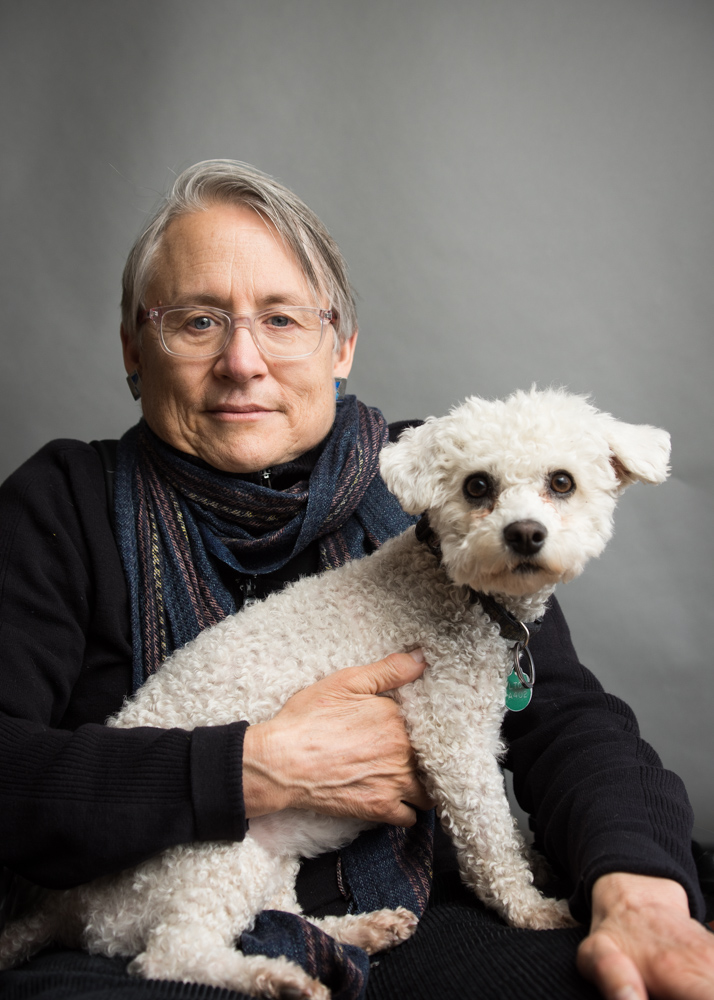
- Crosby with her dog in 2016
- Born: September 2, 1953; Huntingdon, Pennsylvania
- Died: January 5, 2021 (aged 67); Middletown, Connecticut
- Education: Swarthmore College (BA, 1974); Brown University (PhD, 1982)
- Occupations: Scholar, author
- Partner: Janet Jakobsen
- Writing career
- Notable works: The Ends of History; A Body, Undone

Christina Crosby (2 September 1953 – 5 January 2021) was an American scholar and writer, with particular interests in 19th-century British literature and disability studies. She is the author of The Ends of History: Victorians and "The Woman's Question", which considers the place of history and women in 19th-century British literature, and A Body, Undone, a memoir about her life after she was paralyzed in a cycling accident in 2003. She spent her career at Wesleyan University, where she was a professor of English and of feminist, gender, and sexuality studies.

== Early life and education ==
Crosby was born in Huntingdon, Pennsylvania on September 2, 1953. Her father, Kenneth Crosby, was a professor of history at Juniata College. Her mother, Jane Miller Crosby, worked as a professor of home economics at Juniata. Crosby had an older brother Jefferson (born c. 1952).

Crosby attended Huntingdon public schools and graduated from Swarthmore College, in 1974 with a major in English. While at Swarthmore, she co-founded Swarthmore Gay Liberation, and was also active in Swarthmore Women's Liberation. She wrote a column called "The Feminist Slant" in the student newspaper.

In 1975, Crosby enrolled as a graduate student at Brown University and began studying for a Ph.D. in English, completing her degree in 1982. At Brown, Crosby participated in a socialist feminist caucus, organizing around issues like domestic violence. They opened a socialist feminist caucus that focused on issues like domestic violence with a hotline and a new women's shelter, Sojourner House, that was among the first in the US. Crosby also met Elizabeth Weed, at the time the director of Brown's Sarah Doyle Women's Center; they became partners for 17 years.

== Career and research ==
After her PhD, Crosby took up a position as an assistant professor in the English department at Wesleyan University. She immediately joined the student–faculty collective dedicated to strengthening the women's studies program, which had begun in 1979, and remained a core member of this program. She was promoted to associate professor in 1989 and to professor in 1996. As of 2020, she was professor of English and professor of feminist, gender, and sexuality studies. At Wesleyan in the 1990s, Crosby taught the writer Maggie Nelson. The two developed a friendship and each later wrote about the other—Nelson about Crosby in The Argonauts (2015) and Crosby about Nelson in The Body, Undone (2016).

In 1984–1985 Crosby held a National Endowment for the Humanities fellowship for college teachers; she was a member of the Institute for Advanced Study in Princeton, 1990–1991; and she held faculty fellowships at the Wesleyan Center for the Humanities in the fall of 1986 and 1996.

As of 2020, Crosby stated her research interests as disability studies, a field she entered after her 2003 accident, with a focus on grief and mourning. Her earlier work focused on 19th-century British literature.

== Writing ==
=== The Ends of History ===
Crosby's first book, The Ends of History: Victorians and "The Woman's Question" (Routledge, 1991), focuses on the way in which 19th-century British thinkers' understanding of the world primarily through the lens of history relies on women being excluded as "the Other". It was based on her graduate dissertation at Brown. The book includes analysis of a wide range of Victorian works, including fiction – George Eliot's Daniel Deronda, William Thackeray's Henry Esmond, Charles Dickens' Little Dorrit, Charlotte Brontë's Villette, as well as the play The Frozen Deep by Wilkie Collins – alongside historical, theological, philosophical and journalistic works, including Thomas Macaulay's The History of England, Patrick Fairbairn's Hermeneutical Manual and The Typology of Scripture, and letters published in The Morning Chronicle by the journalist Henry Mayhew. Crosby states in her introduction that all the disparate works she discusses "participate in a widespread discourse about history".

Ann Hobart, in a detailed review for Modern Philology, considers The Ends of History to make an important contribution to Victorian studies, praising its "stunning new readings of important texts from a coherent and richly informed theoretical perspective", but believes it to be less important as a work of feminist criticism. Hobart considers Crosby to attack the idea that men's writing can never be significant for feminist thought, highlighting the fact that Crosby considers Daniel Deronda, a novel written by a woman, to represent "masculinist discourse", while the works of male writers Thackeray and Mayhew present a more feminine standpoint. James C. Q. Stewart, writing in The Review of English Studies, praises the book's "fresh and courageous thought" but criticizes perceived methodological weaknesses. Tricia Lootens describes the book in the journal Victorian Studies as an "ambitious, stimulating work", but comments on the "apparently uncritical references to literary legends or to hierarchies based on the values of high culture." Further reviews were published in the Journal of Historical Geography, Albion and The George Eliot, George Henry Lewes Newsletter.

=== A Body, Undone ===
In February 2016, New York University Press published A Body, Undone: Living on after Great Pain, a memoir motivated by the serious spinal cord injury she sustained at age 50 following a bicycle accident. The book was written using voice recognition software. The title draws on Emily Dickinson's poem "After great pain", which also serves as the book's epigraph. Writing for Lambda Literary, Anne Charles observed that the book dwells on pain, refusing "the typical disability narrative's trajectory of improvement and uplift, affirming instead an existence of ongoing literal pain and psychological stress"—a full chapter on negotiating bowel movements with her paralysis. That said, the final chapter records Crosby regaining her ability to hold a pencil, of which she says, through tears, "I have my life back"; Charles reads this moment as encapsulating "struggle to come to terms with impossibly challenging circumstances." In The New Yorker, Michael Weinstein also reads the book as a coming to terms for Crosby herself, comparing the book to Judith Butler's Giving an Account of Oneself, in which Butler emphasizes self-awareness as something made by perceiving the views of others may have of us; others' views of Crosby shift radically after her accident, to the point of misgendering her (once a "femme-y butch" lesbian, in her wheelchair she is mistaken for a man) and Weinstein reads The Body, Undone as Crosby's effort to process the dramatic changes and "make her new self intelligible to herself, even in the wake of changes that have made her almost unrecognizable".

A Body, Undone was unanimously selected as Wesleyan University's First Year Matters Program common reading in 2018.

== Personal life ==
Crosby described herself as a lesbian and a feminist. Since 1997, her partner was Janet Jakobsen, a professor at Barnard College.

Crosby broke her neck in a bicycle accident on October 1, 2003, at age 50. After a month in Hartford Hospital, four months in a rehabilitation hospital, and a year and a half of physical and occupational therapy, she returned to work half-time in September 2005, remaining quadriplegic in the long term.

Crosby's brother Jefferson, who was an attorney, also became quadriplegic after being diagnosed with multiple sclerosis in his twenties. He died in 2010.

Crosby died from pancreatic cancer on January 5, 2021, in Middletown, Connecticut.

== Selected publications ==
=== Books ===
- Crosby, Christina (1991). The Ends of History: Victorians and "The Woman Question". Routledge. ISBN 0-415-00935-9. OCLC 21146745.
- Crosby, Christina (2016). A Body, Undone: Living on After Great Pain. New York University Press. ISBN 978-1-4798-0804-5. JSTOR j.ctt1803zq1. OCLC 936177779.

=== Articles and book chapters ===
- Crosby, Christina (1984). "Charlotte Brontë's Haunted Text". SEL: Studies in English Literature 1500–1900. 24 (4): 701–715. doi:10.2307/450487. JSTOR 450487.
- Crosby, Christina (October 28, 2013) [1992]. "Dealing with Differences". In Butler, Judith; Scott, Joan W. (eds.). Feminists Theorize the Political. Routledge. doi:10.4324/9780203723999. ISBN 978-1-135-76956-7.
