= Irit Rogoff =

Professor of Visual Cultures

- Born: 1947 (age 78–79)
- Education: Courtauld Institute of Art
- Occupations: Professor, writer, curator
- Employer(s): Goldsmiths, University of London

Irit Rogoff is a writer, theorist, teacher and curator. Her research interests include visual culture; contemporary art and critical theory; postcolonialism, geoculture, and geographies, cultures of education and gender. Rogoff obtained her PhD degree from the Courtald Institute of Art in 1987.

She was born in Jerusalem, Israel and immigrated to London for her studies in the 1970s.

== Teaching ==
Between 1989 and 1997 Rogoff taught at UC Davis, where she merged the graduate programs in Art and Critical Theory under the department of Visual Culture. In 2002, she founded the trans-disciplinary department of Visual Cultures at Goldsmiths, University of London where she is a professor of Visual Cultures, heading the PhD in Curatorial/Knowledge program.

== Curating ==
Between 2005 and 2006 Rogoff was part of the curatorial team of the A.C.A.D.E.M.Y project which consisted of a series of exhibitions, projects and events at the Museum of Contemporary Art, Antwerp and the Van Abbemuseum in Eindhoven.

In 2011, together with Stefano Harney, Adrian Heathfield, Massimiliano Mollona, Louis Moreno and Nora Sternfeld she founded the curatorial and research collective freethought. In 2016, freethought was the artistic director of the Bergen Assembly.

== Writing ==
Rogoff has written co-written a number of essays and pamphlets. She has authored one book over 20 years ago:

- Visual Cultures as Seriousness (2013) (co-written with Gavin Butt), Sternberg Press
- Terra Infirma: Geography's Visual Culture (2000).
- A.C.A.D.E.M.Y., co-eds. Angelika Nollert and Irit Rogoff, Revolver (2006)
- Museum Culture – Histories, Discourses, Spectacles (with Daniel Sherman) Minnesota 1994, Routledge 1998.

Rogoff has contributed to various periodicals such as Art Journal, e-flux, and Third Text. She was a guest-editor for the 2010 special issue of e-flux journal no. 14 entitled Education Actualised
