= Amber L. Hollibaugh =

American writer and political activist (1946–2023)

- (undated)
- Born: June 20, 1946; Bakersfield, California, U.S.
- Died: October 20, 2023 (aged 77); Brooklyn, New York, U.S.
- Occupations: Writer, filmmaker and political activist
- Notable work: The Heart of the Matter (1994); Sexuality, Labor, and the New Trade Unionism (1999); My Dangerous Desires: A Queer Girl Dreaming Her Way Home (2002)

Amber L. Hollibaugh (June 20, 1946 – October 20, 2023) was an American writer, filmmaker, activist and organizer concerned with working-class, lesbian and feminist politics. She was a former Executive Director of Queers for Economic Justice and was Senior Activist Fellow Emerita at the Barnard Center for Research on Women. Hollibaugh identified as a "lesbian sex radical, ex-hooker, incest survivor, gypsy child, poor-white-trash, high femme dyke."

== Biography ==
=== Early life ===
Hollibaugh was born in Bakersfield, California. Her father was of Romani descent, while her mother was of Irish ancestry. Her father was dark-skinned and grew up traveling in caravans, and both he and her grandmother were harassed and branded by the Ku Klux Klan. Hollibaugh's working poor upbringing became central to her organizing work, helping her connect with people in rural and small towns and bringing an intersectional approach to her writings on gay rights and sexuality. Before full-time involvement in movement work, Hollibaugh hitchhiked across the country, did sex work, and organized with the Student Nonviolent Coordinating Committee and United Farm Workers.

=== Organizing work ===
After moving to Canada in the late 1960s, Hollibaugh was a leader in the Canadian movement for abortion rights. In 1978, Hollibaugh joined the group organizing against the Briggs Initiative in California, helping to overturn one of the first significant legislative attacks on LGBTQ civil rights. That same year, she was a co-founder, with Allan Bérubé and others, of the San Francisco Lesbian and Gay History Project. While based in San Francisco in the 1970s and 1980s, Hollibaugh was a contributor to the Socialist Review new-left movement journal. She also worked at Modern Times, a well-known movement bookstore and meeting-place.

As discourse on sexuality in the feminist and lesbian-feminist movements picked up in the late 1970s, Hollibaugh was a significant voice in support of sexual liberation and sex work. Hollibaugh, alongside writer and organizer Cherríe Moraga, co-authored the piece "What We're Rollin' around in Bed With", a much-cited piece in the controversial "Sex Issue" of Heresies: A Feminist Publication on Art and Politics. Hollibaugh was a speaker at the 1982 Barnard Conference on Sexuality, a key event in what became known as the feminist sex wars. Hollibaugh has written on the marginalization she experienced afterwards as a result of her being a former sex worker and involvement in the sadomasochism community.

=== Filmmaking and later work ===
Hollibaugh and Gini Reticker produced The Heart of the Matter, a 60-minute documentary film about the confusing messages young women receive about sexuality and sexually transmitted diseases such as AIDS. The film won the 1994 Sundance Film Festival Freedom of Expression Award and premiered to a national audience on PBS.

Hollibaugh and Nikhil Pal Singh's 1999 essay "Sexuality, Labor, and the New Trade Unionism" in Social Text proposed a labor movement "that will take on immigration issues, racism, health care, and the nuances of economic inequality alongside more mainstream labor and 'gay rights' concerns."

Anika Stafford analyzed her memoir My Dangerous Desires (2000) in terms of femme lesbian narratives.

Meryl Altman described Hollibaugh was "a powerful organizing speaker, a very fine incisive writer and a brilliant theorist."

In 2012, Hollibaugh received the Vicki Sexual Freedom Award from the Woodhull Freedom Foundation.

Hollibaugh was the Chief Officer of Elder & LBTI Women's Services at Howard Brown Health Center in Chicago. She was a director of education, advocacy and community building at Services & Advocacy for GLBT Elders in New York.

=== Death ===
Amber L. Hollibaugh died from complications of diabetes in Brooklyn, New York, on October 20, 2023, at the age of 77.

== Publications ==
=== Book ===
- Hollibaugh, Amber (2000). My dangerous desires: a queer girl dreaming her way home. Durham, North Carolina: Duke University Press. ISBN 9780822326250.

=== Articles and essays ===
- Hollibaugh, Amber; Moraga, Cherríe (1983), "What we're rollin around in bed with: sexual silences in feminism", in Snitow, Ann; Stansell, Christine; Thompson, Sharon (eds.), Powers of desire: the politics of sexuality, New York: Monthly Review Press, pp. 394–405, ISBN 9780853456100.
- Hollibaugh, Amber (1996), "Desire for the future: radical hope in passion and pleasure", in Jackson, Stevi; Scott, Sue (eds.), Feminism and sexuality: a reader, New York: Columbia University Press, pp. 224–229, ISBN 9780231107082.
- Hollibaugh, Amber; Singh, Nikhil Pal (Winter 1999). "Sexuality, labor, and the new trade unionism". Social Text. 61 (61): 73–88. JSTOR 488680.
- Hollibaugh, Amber L. (2004). "Sex to gender, past to present, race to class, now to future". GLQ: A Journal of Lesbian and Gay Studies. 10 (2): 261–265. doi:10.1215/10642684-10-2-261. S2CID 143742050.
- Hollibaugh, Amber; English, Deirdre; Rubin, Gayle (June 1982). "Talking sex: a conversation on sexuality and feminism". Feminist Review. 11 (11): 40–52. doi:10.1057/fr.1982.15. JSTOR 1394826. S2CID 143746249.
