= Denise Ferreira da Silva =

Brazilian academic, artist and Afro-Brazilian activist

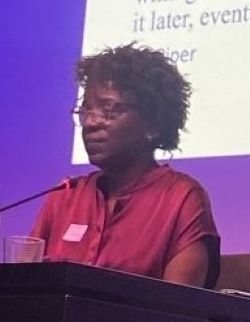
- Born: Botafogo, Rio de Janeiro, Brazil
- Occupations: academic, activist, artist
- Employer(s): New York University; University of British Columbia
- Known for: Critical legal theory, political philosophy, Black feminist thought

Denise Ferreira da Silva is a Brazilian philosopher with an anticolonial black feminist perspective that highlights the centrality of raciality in post-Enlightenment thought. She is an academic, a relational artist, and a visual and installation artist. She is a professor at the New York University. She has worked at a range of other academic institutions including University of British Columbia, where she also directed the Social Justice Institute-GRSJ, Paris 8 University Vincennes-Saint-Denis, Monash University in Australia, Birkbeck, University of London, Queen Mary University of London, the University of Southern California, and the University of California, San Diego.

== Early life and education ==
Ferreira da Silva was born in Morro do Pasmado in the Botafogo neighbourhood of the city of Rio de Janeiro and spent her childhood in Vila Aliança, in the Bangu neighbourhood of that city. At her church in Vila Aliança, she came into contact with elements of liberation theology. She worked on the successful campaign of a black woman, Benedita da Silva, to be elected to the Brazilian Congress, in 1986. At that time, she began to work in the black peoples' and black women's movements.

She completed her undergraduate degree in sociology at the Federal University of Rio de Janeiro (UFRJ) in 1985, obtaining a master's degree in sociology and anthropology from the same university in 1991. She received a doctorate from the University of Pittsburgh in 1999. Since her doctorate, she has dedicated herself to tracing the influence of race on modern thought.

== Career ==
Between 1999 and 2010, Ferreira da Silva was associate professor at the University of California, San Diego, where she served as the director of the Latin American Studies Program, the director of Brazilian Studies, and as associate director of the Centre for Iberian and Latin American Studies in the Ethnic Studies Department. In the department she also served as the vice-chair, and as the director of undergraduate and graduate studies. She was a visiting associate professor at the University of Southern California in 2006 and 2007, teaching in the American Studies and Ethnicity Department.

Ferreira da Silva then held the inaugural chair in ethics at the School of Business and Management at the Centre for Ethics and Politics at Queen Mary University of London. She was also the director of the centre. In 2015 she was appointed as professor and director of the Institute for Gender, Race, Sexuality and Social Justice at the University of British Columbia in Vancouver. She was also a visiting professor at the School of Law at Birkbeck, University of London and adjunct professor of fine arts, at Monash University in Melbourne, Australia. She has also been visiting professor at the University of Pennsylvania and New York University in the US, the University of Toronto in Canada, the University of São Paulo in Brazil, the University of Copenhagen in Denmark, and at the European Graduate School. From 2023, she has held the international chair in contemporary philosophy at the Department of Philosophy at the University of Paris 8, France.

== Publications ==
Ferreira da Silva is the author of Toward a Global Idea of Race, Unpayable Debt, and Homo Modernus, and co-editor (with Paula Chakravartty) of Race, Empire, and the Crisis of the Subprime. Her 2007 monograph Toward a Global Idea of Race raises the question of "why, after more than five hundred years of violence perpetrated by Europeans against people of color, is there no ethical outrage?" She has published articles in leading journals, such as Social Text, Theory, Culture & Society, PhiloSOPHIA A Journal of Continental Feminism, Griffith Law Review, and The Black Scholar. She has also contributed to publications issued at the time of various arts biennials, such as those in Liverpool in 2016. São Paulo in 2016, Venice in 2017, Berlin in 2018, and Singapore in 2022.

She is a member of several editorial and advisory boards, including, the advisory board for the International Consortium for Critical Theory Programs, the Third Text editorial collective and editorial boards of several for journals including Postmodern Culture. She is the principal editor for the Routledge/Cavendish book series Law, Race, and the Postcolonial (with Mark Harris and Brenna Bhandar).

== Artistic work ==
Although Ferreira da Silva's written work often seems impenetrable to non-philosophers, she insists on a broad spectrum of communication directed at different audiences. Her artistic works include the films Serpent Rain (2016), 4Waters-Deep Implicancy (2018), and Soot Breath/Corpus Infinitum (2020), all in collaboration with Arjuna Neuman; and the relational art Poethical Readings and Sensing Salon, in collaboration with Valentina Desideri. Ferreira da Silva described her work Black Feminist Poethics - The Quest(ion) of Blackness Towards the End of the World as follows:

"Would the poet's intention emancipate the Category of Blackness from the scientific and historical ways of knowing that produced it in the first place, which is also the Black Feminist Critic worksite? Would Blackness emancipated from science and history wonder about another praxis and wander in the World, with the ethical mandate of opening up other ways of knowing and doing? (...) Yes. From without the World, as we know it, where the Category of Blackness exists in/as thought – always already a referent of commodity, an object, and 'the other', as 'fact' beyond 'evidence' – a Poethics of Blackness would announce a whole range of possibilities for knowing, doing, and existing."

Ferreira da Silva has exhibited and lectured at major art venues, such as the Centre Pompidou in Paris, the Whitechapel Gallery in London, the São Paulo Museum of Art (MASP), the Museo Nacional Centro de Arte Reina Sofía in Madrid, the Solomon R. Guggenheim Museum and the Museum of Modern Art in New York City as well as at the Ural Industrial Biennial of Contemporary Art held in Yekaterinburg, Russia in 2021 and the São Paulo Biennial in 2023.
