= Scholar and Feminist Online =

- Discipline: Gender studies
- Language: English
- Edited by: Janet Jakobsen, Premilla Nadasen

Publication details
- History: 2003–present
- Publisher: Barnard Center for Research on Women
- Frequency: Triannually
- Open access: Yes
- License: CC BY-SA

Standard abbreviations
- ISO 4: Sch. Fem. Online

Indexing
- ISSN: 1558-9404

Links
- Journal homepage

The Scholar and Feminist Online is an online academic journal covering feminist theories and movements. It is published triannually by the Barnard Center for Research on Women and was established in January 2003. The journal makes extensive use of multimedia elements and recruits a guest editor from outside Barnard College for each issue.

In May 2003, director Janet Jakobsen told the Chronicle of Higher Education: "Our mission was to act as a combination of public feminism and academic feminism... The Internet opens up possibilities that just wouldn't be there in the print format".
