= Gayatri Gopinath =

American professor

Gayatri Gopinath is an associate professor of Social and Cultural Analysis and director of the Center for the Study of Gender and Sexuality at New York University. Gopinath is perhaps best known for her book Impossible Desires: Queer Diasporas and South Asian Public Cultures, which received article-length reviews in a number of journals.

== Education and career ==
Gopinath received a B.A. from Wesleyan University and an M.A. and Ph.D. from Columbia University. She did postdoctoral studies at UC San Diego. Prior to joining the faculty at NYU, she was a professor of Women's Studies at UC Davis.

Gopinath has published numerous essays on gender, sexuality, and diasporic cultural production in journals such as GLQ, Social Text, positions, and Diaspora. Gopinath serves on the editorial board of the journal South Asian Diaspora and on the advisory board of the feminist journal Signs.

Her first book, Impossible Desires: Queer Diasporas and South Asian Public Cultures, came out in 2005. In 2018, Gopinath published Unruly Visions: The Aesthetic Practices of Queer Diaspora, which "brings queer studies to bear on studies of diaspora and visuality, tracing the interrelation of affect, archive, region, and aesthetics through an examination of a wide range of contemporary queer visual culture." The book explores the queer diasporic art practices of interdisciplinary artists Tracey Moffatt, Akram Zaatari, and Allan deSouza.

== Selected works ==
=== Books ===
- Unruly Visions: The Aesthetic Practices of Queer Diaspora Duke University Press, 2018, ISBN 978-1-4780-0035-8
- Impossible Desires: Queer Diasporas and South Asian Public Cultures Duke University Press, 2005, ISBN 978-0-8223-8653-7

=== Articles ===
- Bombay, UK, Yuba City: Bhangra Music and the Engendering of Diaspora, anthologized in "Popular Culture: A Reader"
- Nostalgia, desire, diaspora: South Asian sexualities in motion. Positions 5, no. 2 (1997): 467–489.
- Bollywood Spectacles: Queer Diasporic Critique In The Aftermath Of 9/11 Social Text 84/85 (2005): 157–169.
- Queering Bollywood: Alternative Sexualities In Popular Indian Cinema. Journal of Homosexuality 39.3/4 (2000): 283–297.

=== Book chapters ===
- Foreword: Queer Diasporic Interventions. Textual Practice 25.4 (2011): 635–638.

=== Dissertation ===
- Queer Diasporas: Gender, Sexuality And Migration In Contemporary South Asian Literature And Cultural Production (Ismat Chughtai, Shyam Selvadurai, Shani Mootoo, India)." Dissertation Abstracts International. Section A: Humanities & Social Sciences 59.07 (1999):
