= Janet Jakobsen =

Gender and sexuality scholar

- Education: Emory University
- Occupation: Professor
- Employer: Barnard College
- Notable work: Working Alliances and the Politics of Difference: Diversity and Feminist Ethics; Love the Sin: Sexual Regulation and the Limits of Religious Tolerance with Ann Pellegrini; The Sex Obsession: Perversity and Possibility in American Politics
- Title: Claire Tow Professor of Women's, Gender and Sexuality Studies
- Partner: Christina Crosby

Janet R. Jakobsen is a scholar of gender and sexuality. She is the Claire Tow Professor of Women's, Gender and Sexuality Studies at Barnard College and is the author of several books focusing on gender and sexuality. She also writes on secularism, religion, and violence.

== Biography ==
=== Education ===
Jakobsen attended Dartmouth College for her undergraduate studies, where she received her A.B. in philosophy and economics. She received her M.A. at Claremont School of Theology. Jakobsen received her doctorate from Emory University in the Graduate School of Religion.

=== Career ===
She worked as a policy analyst and organizer in Washington, D.C. and taught at both Wesleyan University and Harvard University and before starting at Barnard. She is the Claire Tow Professor of Women's, Gender and Sexuality Studies at Barnard College. She served as the Director of the Barnard Center for Research on Women (BCRW) for 15 years. She has also been Barnard's Dean for Faculty Diversity and Development.

During her time at BCRW, Jakobsen started the web journal Scholar & Feminist Online. Currently, Jakobsen serves as a principal investigator for the Gender Justice and Neoliberal Transformations Working Group, sponsored by BCRW.

=== Personal life ===
Jakobsen's partner was the Wesleyan professor of English and professor of feminist, gender and sexuality studies Christina Crosby, until Crosby's death in 2021. Crosby writes about their life together after Crosby's paralyzing bike accident in her memoir, A Body, Undone: Living on After Great Pain.

== The Sex Obsession: Perversity and Possibility in American Politics ==
Jakobsen's most recent book, published in 2020 by New York University Press, covers how gender and sexuality repeatedly appear at the center of America political issues. Jakobsen analyzes sexual politics in the first televised presidential debate, the AIDS crisis, the 2010s health care reform issues, #MeToo and more.

The Sex Obsession was a finalist for the 2021 Lambda Literary Award in LGBTQ Studies.

== Bibliography ==
=== Books ===
- Working Alliances and the Politics of Difference: Diversity and Feminist Ethics (Indiana University Press, 1998)
- Love the Sin: Sexual Regulation and the Limits of Religious Tolerance with Ann Pellegrini (New York University Press, 2003; Beacon Press, 2004)
- ed. Interventions: Activists and Academics Respond to Violence with Elizabeth Castelli (Palgrave Macmillan, 2004)
- ed. Secularisms, ed. with Ann Pellegrini (Duke University Press, 2008)
- The Sex Obsession: Perversity and Possibility in American Politics (New York University Press, 2020)

=== Articles and book chapters ===
- "Queer Is? Queer Does?: Normativity and Resistance," GLQ: A Journal of Lesbian and Gay Studies 4 (1998)
- "Family Values and Working Alliances: The Question of Hate and Public Policy," in Welfare Policy: Feminist Critiques, ed. E. Bounds, P. Brubaker and M. Hobgood (Pilgrim Press, 1999)
- " 'He Has Wronged America and Women': Bill Clinton's Sexual Conservatism," in Our Monica, Ourselves: The Clinton Affair and the National Interest, eds. Lisa Duggan and Lauren Berlant (New York University Press, 2001)
- "Can Homosexuals End Western Civilization as We Know It?: Family Values in a Global Economy," in Queer Globalization/Local Homosexualities, ed. A. Cruz- Malavé and M. Manalansan (New York University Press, 2002)
- "Queers Are Like Jews, Aren't They? Analogy and Alliance Politics," in Queer Theory and the Jewish Question, ed. Daniel Boyarin, D. Itzkovitz and Ann Pellegrini (Columbia University Press, 2003)
- "Sex and Freedom" with Elizabeth Lapovsky Kennedy in Regulating Sex, ed. E. Bernstein and L. Schaffner (Routledge Press, 2005)
- "Different Differences: Theory and the Practice of Women's Studies," in Women's Studies for the Future: Foundations, Interrogations, Politics, ed. Elizabeth Lapovsky Kennedy and Agatha Meryl Beins (Rutgers University Press, 2006)
- “Work is Not the Only Problem,” Got Life?: Roundtable Discussion on Work-Life Balance, Journal of Feminist Studies in Religion, 23.2 (Fall 2007).
- “Religion, Politics, and Gender Equality in the U.S.,” with Elizabeth Bernstein, Third World Quarterly, 31.6 (2010).
- “Perverse Justice,” GLQ: A Journal of Lesbian and Gay Studies, 18.1 (2012): 19-28.
- “Collaborations,” American Quarterly, 64.4 (December 2012): 827-32.
- “Visions of Justice: New Economies and New Solidarities,” Journal of the European Society of Women in Theological Research (2014).
- “Gender, Sex, and Religious Freedom in the Context of Secular Law,” with Christine M. Jacobsen and Myanthi Fernando, Feminist Review, 113 (2016): 93-102.
- “Equality of Religious Freedom,” Journal of the American Academy of Religion, 86.1 (March2018): 235-40.
- "Gender in the Production of Religious and Secular Violence," The Blackwell Companion to Religion and Violence. (Wiley-Blackwell, 2011)
- "Is Secularism Less Violent Than Religion?". In Jakobsen, Janet; Castelli, Elizabeth (eds.). Interventions: Activists and Academics Respond to Violence. (Palgrave Macmillan, 2004)
