= Fred Moten =

American poet and scholar

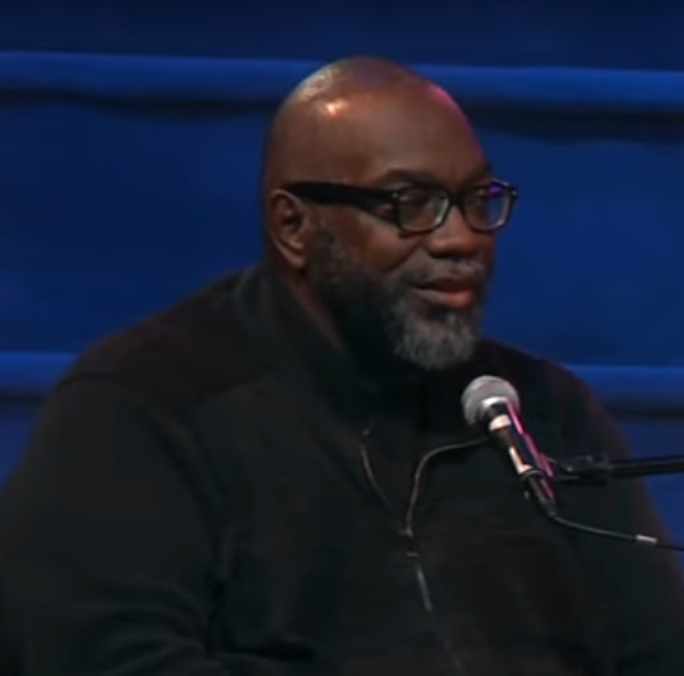
- Moten in 2016
- Born: August 18, 1962 (age 64); Las Vegas, Nevada, U.S.
- Education: Harvard University (BA); University of California, Berkeley (MA, PhD)
- Occupations: Professor, poet, scholar, cultural theorist
- Employer: New York University
- Known for: Poetry and essays on African-American culture, Black thought
- Notable work: The Undercommons: Fugitive Planning & Black Study, 2013, (coauthored with Stefano Harney); In the Break: The Aesthetics of the Black Radical Tradition, 2003; The Little Edges, 2014; The Feel Trio, 2014; B Jenkins, 2010; Hughson’s Tavern, 2008, Stolen Life, 2018, Black and Blur, 2018, The Universal Machine, 2018); "All Incomplete", 2021, (coauthored with Stefano Harney)

Fred Moten (born 1962) is an American cultural theorist, poet, and scholar whose work explores critical theory, black studies, and performance studies. Moten is Professor of Performance Studies at New York University and Distinguished Professor Emeritus at University of California, Riverside; he previously taught at Duke University, and the University of Iowa. His scholarly texts include The Undercommons: Fugitive Planning & Black Study which was co-authored with Stefano Harney, In the Break: The Aesthetics of the Black Radical Tradition, and The Universal Machine (Duke University Press, 2018). He has published numerous poetry collections, including The Little Edges, The Feel Trio, B Jenkins, and Hughson's Tavern.

In 2020, Moten was awarded a MacArthur Fellowship for "[c]reating new conceptual spaces to accommodate emerging forms of Black aesthetics, cultural production, and social life."

== Biography ==
Fred Moten was born in Las Vegas in 1962 and was raised Catholic in the segregated black neighborhood on the western end of the city. His parents were among the black families that made up the Great Migration, the period in US history when many black families moved from the Deep South to seek new prospects in the northern and western parts of the country. His parents were originally from Louisiana and Arkansas, and after resettling in Las Vegas, his father found employment at the Las Vegas Convention Center (and later worked for Pan American Airlines), and his mother worked as a grade school teacher.

Moten enrolled in Harvard University in 1980, hoping to pursue a degree in economics. His interest in sociopolitical discourse, the work of Noam Chomsky, civic outreach, and political activism led him away from his studies. At the end of his first year, Moten was required to take a year leave. During this time, he worked as a janitor at the Nevada Test Site, wrote poetry, and discovered the works of T. S. Eliot and Joseph Conrad, among many others. His return to Harvard was more successful and led to developing his understanding of prose and finding more inspiration for his own work. It was also during this time that he met his collaborator-to-be Stefano Harney. After graduating, Moten went on to pursue his PhD at University of California, Berkeley.

== Critical work ==
Moten makes considerable intellectual contributions to the discourses of Black studies, poetry and poetics, critical race theory and contemporary American literature. He has been profiled by Harvard Magazine, The New Yorker, The Brooklyn Rail, and LitHub.com about his life and work in scholarship. In 2016, he was awarded a Guggenheim Fellowship and the Stephen E. Henderson Award for Outstanding Achievement in Poetry by the African American Literature and Culture Society. Moten's work The Feel Trio (2014), named after Cecil Taylor's trio with William Parker and Tony Oxley, was awarded the Los Angeles Times Book Prize, and was a poetry finalist for the National Book Award. He also received a Foundation for Contemporary Arts Roy Lichtenstein Award (2018).

He has served on numerous editorial boards including American Quarterly, Callaloo, Social Text, and Discourse. He has served on advisory boards for Issues in Critical Investigation at Vanderbilt University, the Critical Theory Institute at the University of California, Irvine, and was on the board of directors of the Center for Lesbian and Gay Studies at City University of New York. As of September 2018, Moten is professor in the Department of Performance Studies at New York University's Tisch School of the Arts, where he teaches courses in Black studies, poetics, music and critical race theory.

One of his best-known works is a series of essays he published with Stefano Harney in a book called The Undercommons. Throughout these works, he criticizes academia's drive to professionalize the student, logistical capitalism, debt–credit hierarchies, and state-based institutions. He offers a theory of hapticality and to stay in debt to one another as a means of understanding one's own relationship to the world and to others.

The essay "Catalogue Number 308 (The Black Apparatus Is a Little Girl)", in Black and Blur, discusses photograph number 308 in Thomas Eakins' photographic collection at the Pennsylvania Academy of the Fine Arts. The photograph depicts a nude African-American girl, posed as Venus. Saidiya Hartman discusses the photograph as well, in her book Wayward Lives, Beautiful Experiments: Intimate Histories of Social Upheaval.

In May 2024, Moten gave a keynote lecture at an academic conference: "Jews and Black Theory: Conceptualizing Otherness in the Twenty-First Century", held at Harvard University.

== Statements ==
"Black studies is a dehiscence at the heart of the institution on its edge; its broken, coded documents sanction walking in another world while passing through this one, graphically disordering the administered scarcity from which black studies flows as wealth."

Reflecting on his old neighborhood, Moten recalled: "I grew up around people who were weird. No one's blackness was compromised by their weirdness, and by the same token... nobody's weirdness was compromised by their blackness... In my mind I have this image of Sonny Boy Williamson wearing one of those harlequin suits he liked to wear. These dudes were strange, and I always felt that's just essential to black culture. George Clinton is weird. Anybody that we care about, that we still pay attention to, they were weird."

== Works ==
=== Academic ===
- With Stefano Harney: All Incomplete (London: Minor Compositions, 2021)
- The Universal Machine (series: Consent Not to Be a Single Being; Duke University Press, 2018)
- Stolen Life (series: Consent Not to Be a Single Being; Duke University Press, 2018)
- Black and Blur (series: Consent Not to Be a Single Being; Duke University Press, 2017)
- With Stefano Harney: A Poetics of the Undercommons (Sputnik and Fizzle, 2016)
- Who touched me? (with Wu Tsang; If I Can't Dance, I Don't Want to be Part of Your Revolution, 2016)
- With Stefano Harney: The Undercommons: Fugitive Planning and Black Study (London: Minor Compositions/Autonomedia, 2013)
- In the Break: The Aesthetics of the Black Radical Tradition (University of Minnesota Press, 2003)

=== Creative ===
- perennial fashion presence falling (Wave Books, 2023)
- All That Beauty (Letter Machine Editions, 2019)
- The Service Porch (Letter Machine Editions, 2016)
- The Little Edges (Wesleyan University Press, 2015)
- The Feel Trio (Letter Machine Editions, 2014)
- B. Jenkins (Duke University Press, 2010)
- Hughson's Tavern (Leon Works, 2009)
- I ran from it but was still in it (Cusp Books, 2007)
- Poems (with Behrle, Jim; Pressed Wafer, 2002)
- Arkansas (Pressed Wafer, 2000)
