= Roderick Ferguson =

American academic

Roderick Ferguson is Professor of Women's, Gender, and Sexuality Studies and American Studies at Yale University. He was previously professor in the departments of Gender and Women's Studies and African American Studies at the University of Illinois Chicago. His scholarship includes work on queer social movements, social theory, the sociology of race relations, and the politics of culture. Among his contributions to queer theory, Ferguson is credited with coining the term queer of color critique, which he defines as "interrogat[ion] of social formations as the intersections of race, gender, sexuality, and class, with particular interest in how those formations correspond with and diverge from nationalist ideals and practices." Queer of color critique draws from women of color feminism, materialist analysis, poststructuralist theory, and queer critique. Ferguson is also known for his critique of the modern university and the corporatization of higher education.

== Life and career ==
Ferguson received his B.A. in sociology from Howard University in 1994 before receiving his M.A. and Ph.D. from the sociology program at the University of California, San Diego, in 1997 and 2000, respectively. He was the recipient of the Modern Language Association's Crompton-Noll Award in 2000 for his article "The Parvenu Baldwin and the Other Side of Redemption". He served as associate editor of American Quarterly: The Journal of the American Studies Association from 2007 to 2010 and filled the position of department chair in American Studies at the University of Minnesota from 2009 to 2012. Ferguson served as the 2018 president of the American Studies Association, delivering his presidential address, "To Catch a Light-Filled Vision: American Studies and the Activation of Radical Traditions", at the November 2018 annual conference.

At the University of Illinois Chicago, Ferguson served as the co-director of the Racialized Body research cluster. Before joining the faculty at the University of Illinois, he was a professor at the University of Minnesota, where he was chair of the Department of American Studies from 2009 to 2012. In 2004, he was a scholar-in-residence for the "Queer Locations" seminar at the University of California Humanities Research Institute. In 2013, he was the Old Dominion Visiting Faculty for the Council of the Humanities and the Center for African American Studies at Princeton University.

Ferguson is most known for the concept of queer of color critique from his book Aberrations in Black, which is rooted in the work of Audre Lorde, Cherríe Moraga, Barbara Smith, and the Combahee River Collective particularly by not presuming homogeneity across racial or national groups. Instead, it offers relational analyses of the racialized, gendered, and sexualized valuation and devaluation of human life.

== Works ==
=== Aberrations in Black: Toward a Queer of Color Critique (2004) ===
Aberrations in Black critically discusses the works of Richard Wright, Ralph Ellison, James Baldwin, Toni Morrison, and Karl Marx, and connects American cultural studies to questions of sociology, queer theory, postcolonial studies, and African American studies. Ferguson suggests that intellectual inquiry is not neatly defined within the boundaries of a single discipline, but that it is shaped out of heterogeneity. Aberrations in Black is a response to the canon and its regulation of sexual difference.

Ferguson begins his discussion with a description of a black drag queen prostitute, who serves as a fixture of urban capitalism in Marlon Riggs' Tongues United. This figure is confusing in that she is multiply determined and excluded by difference in race, class, sexuality, and gender. Ferguson proposes queer of color critique as a mode of analysis for interpreting the black drag queen prostitute, and uses this figure to demonstrate the heterogeneity of social categories with in the culture and genealogy of the West.

Queer of color critique emerges in Aberrations in Black as a method for challenging ideologies that work to conceal the intersections of race, class, gender, sexuality, and nation. Ferguson builds on the historical materialist idea that capital produces social formations that exceed the acceptable boundaries of gendered and racialized sexual ideals, while also critiquing the representation of these formations as pathological. He also challenges the view of identity as a goal to be achieved, drawing from Barbara Smith's essay “Towards a Black Feminist Criticism” to argue that identity should be a space to negotiate social contradictions, rather than a space where differences are concealed for the sake of stability.

Ferguson uses the African American novel as a site of material and discursive multiplicity that can exist outside of Western canonical genealogies. He views African American novels as a cultural form that can deepen understandings of gender and sexuality in African American culture. Ferguson borrows from Toni Morrison's Sula and discusses Richard Wright's Native Son, Ralph Ellison's Invisible Man, and James Baldwin's Go Tell it on the Mountain to display how the African American novel is a site of reflection compelled by struggles over gender and sexuality within the African American community. He juxtaposes these novels with sociological texts like the Combahee River Collective Statement and the Moynihan Report to contextualize heteropatriarchy and oppositional movements.

==== Native Son ====
Chapter 1 of Aberrations in Black juxtaposes Richard Wright's Native Son with the sociological work of Robert E. Park, who imagined assimilation and migration through heterosexual reproduction. Park believed urbanization exposed the “primary group” to prostitution, homosexuality, and juvenile delinquency, equating African American neighborhoods with nonheteronormative formations. Ferguson understands Wright as responding to social disorganization as a feminizing process "that disrupted African American gender and sexual integrity." Wright's use of the Bigger Thomas character, who is a feminized figure not conforming to heteropatriarchy or national ideals, represents the nonheteronormative dysfunction and gendered features within racial domination. Ferguson argues that working-class exploitation of Black men is demonstrated to be the source of feminization and societal dysfunction in Park and Wright's work.

==== Invisible Man ====
Chapter 2 of Aberrations in Black contains a detailed description of Professor Woodridge, a character present in an unpublished chapter of Ralph Ellison's Invisible Man. To Ferguson, Woodridge represents nonconformity and opposition to the canon within the university. Ferguson juxtaposes this book with Robert Park's desire to "Americanize" racial groups that threatened national unity, and Woodridge, a member of a Western university, is argued to defy what Americanization programs were supposed to correct. Ferguson demonstrates through the character of Woodridge how the queer of color can resist interpellation from categories of African American identity determined by dominant literary representations, and how other subjects can be inspired to defy the operation of these forces.

==== Go Tell It on the Mountain ====
Ferguson uses James Baldwin's Go Tell It on the Mountain as a critique of heteronormativity, discussing how the construction of black people as non-heteronormative impacts the psyche of African Americans in the novel. Particularly, Ferguson discusses how Baldwin uses the Grimes family as a representation of "pathological" and "dirty" stereotypes used to describe the Harlem community.

==== Something Else to Be ====
Chapter 4 of Aberrations in Black critiques normative and oppressive discussions in sociology, the black power movement, and white feminist spaces. Ferguson references Audre Lorde, Cheryl Clarke, and Barbara Smith, as well as Toni Morrison's Sula, and utilizes these black feminists' critiques of these discourses in this chapter. He agrees with them that lesbianism counters identity politics, as well as critiquing white feminist spaces for their lack of inclusivity of black women, especially lesbians. Ferguson critiques the Moynihan Report for blaming black mothers for black marginalization and pushing the narrative that the U.S. had left its oppressive past behind as liberation movements began in developing countries and civil rights took off domestically, which would situate the U.S.’s rationale as the police of the world. He also criticizes the discourses in black power movements that position heterosexuality and patriarchal family structures as superior, which especially excludes black lesbians and calls for more coalition building.

===== Sula =====
Ferguson uses Toni Morrison's Sula as another example of a novel that depicts sexual non-heteronormativity, illustrating queer black critiques that attempt to displace heteropatriarchal discourse. Ferguson argues that black lesbians such as Audre Lorde and Barbara Smith were leaders in critiquing heterosexuality and patriarchy during movements in the 1970s and 80s, utilizing Sula as a model for resistance. Sula is articulated as a framework for queer of color critique that questioned race, class, gender, and interlocking forms of oppression.

=== Strange Affinities (2011) ===
Strange Affinities is an anthology of ethnic studies essays compiled and edited by Ferguson and Grace Kyungwon Hong. The essays in Strange Affinities follow Ferguson's intellectual tradition of queer of color critique and explore the possibilities of progressive coalitions in the production of racial, gender, and sexual difference. The essays focus specifically on how queer of color critique and woman of color feminism can create a common language for disparate groups extending beyond traditional strategies of coalition and solidarity.

=== The Reorder of Things: The University and its Pedagogies of Minority Difference (2012) ===
In The Reorder of Things, Ferguson traces the history of interdisciplinarity in the university, including the rise of departments of race, gender, ethnicity, and queer studies, and argues that they are essential to the development of power in academia, the state, and global capitalism rather than a challenge to it. He narrates 1960s and 70s movements in universities across the United States in which minority and women students organized to protest racial and gender discrimination and inequality on college campuses. Ferguson ultimately asserts that cultural studies and other minority movements are easily co-opted by the state, and it is necessary to develop new modes of analysis that resist the power of the institution.

Adrian Piper's art collage Self Portrait 2000 is used at the beginning of the book to exemplify how institutions—including the university, the state, and capital—actively work to undermine projects of equality despite outwardly promoting diversity. This project is used by Ferguson to demonstrate how the American academy has failed to keep promises to students of color. He borrows from Michel Foucault's arguments in The History of Sexuality about power as intentional and calculating to describe how institutions view minority movements as elements that can be co-opted and incorporated into its own objectives. Ferguson uses "power" in Foucault's terms as a "strategical situation in a particular society" and is a mode for calculating and arranging minority difference that is not individual, but systemic and representative of a network of fluctuating relationships.

The Reorder of Things details 1960s and 70s student organizing including the Chicano Movement, specifically focusing on the Lumumba-Zapata Collective at the University of California, San Diego, which aimed to establish a college to educate black, Chicano, and poor white students. Ferguson uses the examples of these movements to demonstrate how the academy, the US nation-state and capital used revolutionary organizing by minorities to bolster the US political economy, while failing to actually represent those subjects.

=== We Demand: The University and Student Protests (2017) ===
Ferguson's August 2017 book is an installation of the series American Studies Now: Critical Histories of the Present, and it further develops his arguments on the university and post-World War II student activism. Ferguson argues that the university has increased its attempts to maintain the status quo and regulate students and faculty on campus, following a growing trend of anti-intellectualism in the United States.
