= Ann Pellegrini =

Gender, sexuality and performance studies scholar

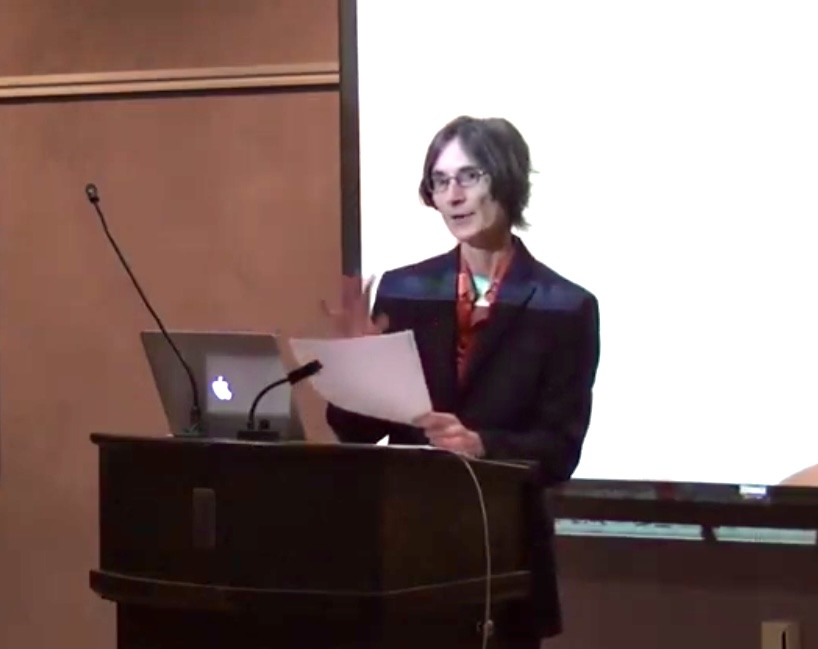
Ann Pellegrini in 2013

Ann Pellegrini is Professor of Performance Studies (Tisch School of the Arts) and Social and Cultural Analysis (Faculty of Arts and Science) at NYU and the director of NYU's Center for the Study of Gender and Sexuality. In 1998, they founded the Sexual Cultures book series at NYU Press with José Muñoz; they now co-edit the series with Joshua Takano Chambers-Letson and Tavia Nyong'o. Their book You Can Tell Just By Looking, co-authored with Michael Bronski and Michael Amico, was a finalist for the 2014 Lambda Literary Award for Best LGBT Non-Fiction.

Pellegrini has undergraduate degrees from Harvard College, where they were president of the Radcliffe Union of Students, and Oxford University. They then earned an M.A. and Ph.D. from Harvard University.

== Bibliography ==
- Performance Anxieties: Staging Psychoanalysis, Staging Race (Routledge, 1997)
- Love the Sin: Sexual Regulation and the Limits of Religious Tolerance with Janet R. Jakobsen (NYU Press, 2003; Beacon Press, 2004)
- "You Can Tell Just By Looking" and 20 Other Myths about LGBT Life and People with Michael Bronski and Michael Amico (Beacon Press, 2013)
- ed. Queer Theory and the Jewish Question with Daniel Boyarin and Daniel Itzkovitz (Columbia University Press, 2003)
- ed. Secularisms with Janet R. Jakobsen (Duke University Press, 2008)
- Saketopoulou, Avgi; Pellegrini, Ann (2023). Gender Without Identity. Events (First ed.). New York, NY: The Unconscious in Translation. ISBN 978-1-942254-19-5.
