= Stefano Harney =

American activist and scholar

Stefano Harney is an American activist and scholar. Prior to relocating to Brazil, Harney taught at Singapore Management University, and was known for once awarding all his students "A" grades with the same score. Also, he has taught at Royal Holloway, University of London as well as at the European Graduate School. Currently, he is professor of transversal aesthetics at Academy Media Arts Cologne (KHM)

He is a long-time collaborator with the 2020 MacArthur Fellows Program poet and scholar Fred Moten, as well as the scholar and current Barbadian ambassador to Brazil Tonika Sealy-Thompson.

== Education ==
In 1985, Harney received a BA in English and American Literature and Language from Harvard University. In 1988, he received a MA in American Studies from New York University. In 1993, he received a PhD from the Faculty of Social and Political Sciences at the University of Cambridge.

== Collaboration With Fred Moten ==
Harney co-authored The Undercommons: Fugitive Planning & Black Study with Fred Moten (Autonomedia/Minor Compositions, 2013). The text is a book-length series of essays that critiques the academy through a black radical lens. Moten and Harney have been friends for over 30 years and collaborators over 15 years; they frequently appear together at panels, interviews, and academic talks. The two are currently preparing for the publication of their second book together, All Incomplete, forthcoming from Autonomedia in 2021.

== Works ==
- The Liberal Arts and Management Education: A Global Agenda for Change (co-authored by Howard Thomas, Cambridge University Press, 2020)
- The Undercommons: Fugitive Planning & Black Study (co-authored by Fred Moten, Minor Compositions, 2013)
- The Culture of Management (Routledge, 2008)
- State Work: Public Administration and Mass Intellectuality (Duke University Press, 2002)
- "Fragment on Kropotkin and Giuliani" in Social Text (Volume 20, Number 3 (72), Duke University Press, September 10, 2002)
- Nationalism and Identity (Zed Books, 1996)
