= The Undercommons =

2013 essay collection by Fred Moten and Stefano Harney

- Author: Fred Moten; Stefano Harney
- Published: 2013, Autonomedia/Minor Compositions; 2018 (Spanish)
- Media type: Collection of essays
- Pages: 166
- ISBN: 978-1-57027-267-7
- Dewey Decimal: 303.3

The Undercommons: Fugitive Planning & Black Study is a collection of essays by Fred Moten and Stefano Harney, published in 2013. The collection criticizes academia.

== Publication ==
The Undercommons is composed of essays written by Fred Moten and Stefano Harney, alumni of Harvard University who met while at the school. It was published in 2013 by Autonomedia and Minor Compositions. It is 166 pages long. Upon publication, it was made available for free download.

In 2018, The Undercommons was translated into Spanish by Cristina Rivera Garza, Marta Malo, and Juan Pablo, and published by Cooperativa Cráter Invertido and La Campechana Mental.

== Synopsis ==
The Undercommons is composed of six essays as well as an interview with Stevphen Shukaitis. The text includes criticism of academia and public policy (as a discipline). While densely written, the second and fifth essays generally suggest that universities are part of a societal structure that turns "insurgents into state agents" (the professional–managerial class, in socialist terms) and upholds existing capitalist society; the societal respectability that universities provide should be rejected. The other essays consider topics such as debt and a comparison between modern transportation networks and the experience of African communities in the slave trade.

== Reception ==
In the Chicago Tribune in 2015, Abigail Satinsky described The Undercommons as being "about how to intellectually be together," while her fiance Anthony Romero described it as "about how everyday social life, outside of academic institutions, forms a kind of intellectual practice". In T in 2016, Maggie Nelson listed The Undercommons as one of her ten favorite books, describing it as a "difficult, beautiful, vertiginous, fortifying and enlivening piece of work" about concepts including "study, debt, surround, planning and the shipped."

A 2018 article about Fred Moten by Jesse McCarthy in Harvard Magazine described The Undercommons as a manifesto, characterizing it as "an analysis of alienated academic labor at the contemporary American university" but also a more radical "manual for free thinking". Referring to the way the text circulated among students, adjunct professors, and professors without tenure, McCarthy compared it to samizdat.

In a 2021 review in CLA Journal, Timothy Lyle described The Undercommons as "a provocative world-making project or, at the very least, a radical reorientation toward love and belonging that has deep ties to a Black radical tradition", and stated that "Harney and Moten see little value in merely altering variables in an already-existing social world".

=== Analysis and applications ===
In 2015, an article in New Zealand Sociology suggested that the undercommons as characterized in The Undercommons was a necessary creation as a response to student debt and financialization at the University of Auckland, using it to suggest that students "must look beyond the university for progressive alternatives." Defining the "commons" as the shared wealth of the university as an institution, a "commons of knowledge and pedagogy", the authors subsequently questioned its status as a commons because of the university's status as "an elite institution which is in itself based on hierarchy and privilege". They stated that people who are not welcomed within the university "will seek that refuge beyond the institution’s professionalised modes of knowledge and pedagogy", in the undercommons, and noted The Undercommons's characterization of the undercommons as a space that envisions "not necessarily the end of the situation but the end of a ‘world’ in which the current situation makes any sense whatsoever."

A 2018 article by G. H. Greer in Brock Education analyzed the concept of the undercommons in the context of secondary school, proposing that "in a high school context, the virtual space of the undercommons is created by affiliation among individuals passing out of belonging with the functions of administrative policy and into belonging with each other."

In Postdigital Science and Education, a 2020 article by Richard Hall titled "Covid-19 and the Hopeless University at the End of the End of History" stated that the COVID-19 pandemic "has made real the undercommons of the University as a moment of survival and of fugitive planning". Hall elaborated that academic laborers including university staff and students had generated organizing power and energy during the crisis, and questioned how those laborers would "respond to the institutional focus upon its own economic and financial welfare, over our corporeal and psychological well-being".
