= Zethu Matebeni =

South African writer and film director (born 1978)

- Born: 1 May 1978 (age 48)
- Education: Wits Institute for Social & Economic Research (WISER)
- Occupations: Academic and Activist

Zethu Matebeni is a sociologist, activist, writer, documentary film maker, Professor and South Africa Research Chair in Sexualities, Genders and Queer Studies at the University of Fort Hare. She has held positions at the University of the Western Cape and has been senior researcher at the Institute for Humanities in Africa (HUMA) at UCT. She has been a visiting Professor Yale University and has received a number of research fellowships including those from African Humanities Program, Ford Foundation, the Fogarty International Centre and the National Research Foundation.

== Early life and education ==
Matebeni was born on May 1, 1978, in the Eastern Cape, South Africa. She studied Sociology at the Nelson Mandela Metropolitan University and completed her Master of Arts in Sociology at the University of Pretoria and an interdisciplinary Phd completed at the Witwatersrand Institute for Social and Economic Research (WISER) at University of the Witwatersrand. Her published doctoral project is entitled Black Lesbian Sexualities and Identity in South Africa.

== Activist work ==
Zethu has been involved in LGBTQ activism since the early 1990s. Having been part of Uthingo Womyn's Group (one of the few lesbian feminist collectives in South Africa) and later part of Free Gender, a black lesbian organisation in Khayelitsha, Cape Town. Within the academic space she has been involved with the #RhodesMustFall movement at the University of Cape Town as well as one of the founding members of the Black Academic Caucus at the same institution. Her films and curated works including Jo'burg TRACKS: Sexuality in the City, and a book project Reclaiming Afrikan: queer perspectives on sexual and gender identities similarly engage with LGBT activism. Her first co-production Breaking Out of the Box: Stories of black lesbians (2011) has been shown both within South Africa and abroad. Her work with documentary films also includes writing the short film Rise.

== Academic work and publications ==
She has published on queer issues, sexuality, gender, race, HIV and AIDS, African film, cinema and photography. She is an active member of the Black Academic Caucus through which she published a few thought pieces, some of which are listed below.

=== Books ===
- Co-edited with Surya Monro and Vasu Reddy, Queer in Africa: LGBTQI Identities, Citizenship, and Activism (Routledge, 2018)
- Curated Reclaiming Afrikan: queer perspectives on sexual and gender identities. Cape Town: Modjaji books. ISBN 9781920590499 (2014)
- Black lesbian sexualities and identity in South Africa: an ethnography of black lesbian urban life . Germany: LAP LAMBERT Academic Publishing (ISBN 978-3-659-20294-0) (2012)

=== Book chapters ===
- Zethu Matebeni. 2015. Sexual Minorities in South Africa. In: James D. Wright (editor-in chief), International Encyclopedia of the Social & Behavioral Sciences, 2nd edition, Vol 21. Oxford: Elsevier, pp 744–749.
- Zethu Matebeni. 2015. Well-Suited. In Raél Jero Salley (ed). PROMISE. Cape Town: ACTSA Publishing, 14-19.
- Zethu Matebeni. 2014. My best participants' informed consent. In Deborah Posel and Fiona Ross (eds.), Ethical quandaries in social research. Pretoria: HSRC Press, 111-124.
- Zethu Matebeni. 2014. Death and the modern black lesbian. In Devan Pillay, Gilbert M Khadiagala, Prishani Naidoo, Roger Southall (eds) New South African Review 4: A Fragile Democracy – Twenty Years On . Wits University Press .pp 183–193.
- Zethu Matebeni. 2014. How not to write about queer South Africa. In Zethu Matebeni (curator), Reclaiming Afrikan: queer perspectives on sexual and gender identities. Cape Town: Modjaji books, 61-63.
- Zethu Matebeni. 2013. Deconstructing violence towards black lesbians in South Africa. In Sokari Ekine and Hakima Abbas (eds), Queer African Reader. Fahamu Books, 343-354.
- Zethu Matebeni. 2012. Feminizing Lesbians, Degendering Transgender Men: A Model for Building Lesbian Feminist Thinkers and Leaders in Africa? In Shaka McGlotten and Dana-Ain Davis (eds). Black Genders and Sexualities. Palgrave Macmillan, pp 187–193.
- Matebeni, Zethu. 2011. TRACKS: Researching Sexualities Walking AbOUT the city of Johannesburg. In Tamale, Sylvia (ed). African Sexuality Reader. Oxford: Fahamu Books, 50-56.
- Zethu Matebeni. 2009. "Sexing women: young black lesbians' reflections on sex and responses to safe(r) sex. In Vasu Reddy, Theo Sandfort and Laetitia Rispel (eds). From Social Silence to Social Science: Same-sex sexuality, HIV&AIDS and gender in South Africa. Cape Town: HSRC Press, pp 100-116.
- Zethu Matebeni. 2008. "Blissful Complexities: black lesbians reflect on same-sex marriage and the Civil Union Act" In TO HAVE AND TO HOLD, the making of same-sex marriage in South Africa edited by Judge (M.), Manion (A.) & de Waal (S.) Fanele: Johannesburg, pp. 249–257.

=== Journal articles ===
- Henriette Gunkel, Zethu Matebeni, and Catherine Raissiguier (guest editors). 2015. In Movement: Women in Africa and the African Diaspora. JENdA: A Journal of Culture and African Women Studies, 26: 1-18.
- Zethu Matebeni and Thabo Msibi. 2015. Vocabularies of the 'non-normative'. Introduction to "'Non-normative sexual and gender diversities in Africa". Agenda, 29(1): 3-9.
- Henriette Gunkel and Zethu Matebeni. 2015. Resilience through new media: a conversation with Iranti-org's Executive Director, Jabu C. Pereira. JENdA: A Journal of Culture and African Women Studies, 26: 128-134.
- Theo Sandfort, M Somien Frazer, Zethu Matebeni, Vasu Reddy, Ian Southey-Swartz and the Southern African Lesbian and Bisexual Women Research Team. 2015. Histories of forced sex and health outcomes among Southern African lesbian and bisexual women: a cross-sectional study. BMC Women's Health, 15: 22
- Zethu Matebeni. 2013. Intimacy, queerness and race. Cultural Studies, 27:3: 404-417
- Zethu Matebeni, Vasu Reddy, Theo Sandfort and Ian Southey-Swartz. 2013. "I thought we are safe": Southern African lesbian women's experiences of living with HIV Culture, Health & Sexuality
- Sandfort TGM, Baumann LRM, Matebeni Z, Reddy V, Southey-Swartz I. 2013. Forced Sexual Experiences as Risk Factor for Self-Reported HIV Infection among Southern African Lesbian and Bisexual Women. PLoS ONE 8(1): e53552.doi:10.1371/journal.pone.0053552
- Zethu Matebeni. 2012. Queer(ing) porn - A conversation, Agenda: Empowering women for gender equity, 26(3): 61-69
- Bagnol Brigitte, Matebeni Zethu, Simon Anne, Blaser Thomas M., Manuel, Sandra, and Moutinho Laura. 2010. Transforming Youth Identities: Interactions Across "Races/Colors/Ethnicities," Gender, Class, and Sexualities in Johannesburg, South Africa. Sexuality Research and Social Policy, 7(4): 283-297.
- Blaser Thomas M, Bagnol Brigitte, Matebeni Zethu, Simon Anne, and Manuel, Sandra. 2010. "Race", Resentment and Racism: Transformation in South Africa. Cadernos Pagu [online], 35: 111-137.
- Zethu Matebeni; Thais Medina Coeli Rochel de Camargo (tradução); Kenneth Rochel de Camargo Jr (revisão técnica); Laércio Fidelis Dias (revisão técnica). 2009. All Sexed Up: a resposta de mulheres lésbicas negras jovens ao sexo (mais) seguro em Johannesburg, África do Sul. PHYSIS: Revista de Saúde Coletiva, Rio de Janeiro, 19(2):333-348
- Zethu Matebeni. 2009. Feminizing Lesbians, Degendering Transgender Men: A Model for Building Lesbian Feminist Thinkers and Leaders in Africa? SOULS: A Critical Journal of Black Politics, Culture, and Society, 11(3): 347-354
- Zethu Matebeni. 2008. Vela Bambhentsele: Intimacies and Complexities in Researching within Black Lesbian Groups in Johannesburg. Feminist Africa, 11:89-96
- Kari A Hartwig, Debbie Humphries, Zethu Matebeni. 2008. Building capacity for AIDS NGOs in southern Africa: evaluation of a pilot initiative. Health Promotion International, Apr 10; 18407925 (P,S,G,E,B,D)
- Naidoo, Kamila, Matebeni, Zethu and Pietersen-Snyman, Marian. 2004. 'Complexities and challenges: men's responses to HIV and AIDS In Winterveld, South Africa. Commonwealth youth and Development

=== Other writing ===
- Zethu Matebeni. 2016. "Why Fees Must Fall". Sparkling Women. January, Vol 28.
- Zethu Matebeni. 2015. "The more things change, the more they stay the same. The curious case of black women and queer life at UCT ". Thoughtleader.
- Zethu Matebeni. 2013. Rape? Looks more like genocide. Mail&Guardian, 6 September.
- Zethu Matebeni. 2012. Gone @ 20 – the lucky ones are not yet born, a review of Zanele Muholi's exhibition Mo(u)rning. Black looks, 28 September.
- Zethu Matebeni. 2010. Dismantling gender boxes: Right to complex sexual identities. South African Labour Bulletin, 34(1): 33-34.
- Zethu Matebeni. 2009. Review of "Black Bull, Ancestors and Me: my life as a lesbian sangoma" by Nkunzi Zandile Nkabinde. Mail&Guardian, 22 June.

== Bibliography ==
- JENdA: A Journal of Culture and African Women Studies, 26: 1-18 and 26: 128-134.
- Agenda, 29(1): 3-9.
- BMC Women's Health, 15: 22
- Cultural Studies, 27:3: 404-417
- Culture, Health & Sexuality
- PLoS ONE 8(1): e53552.doi:10.1371/journal.pone.0053552
- Agenda: Empowering women for gender equity, 26(3): 61-69
- Sexuality Research and Social Policy, 7(4): 283-297.
- Cadernos Pagu [online], 35: 111-137.
- PHYSIS: Revista de Saúde Coletiva, Rio de Janeiro, 19(2):333-348
- Culture, and Society, 11(3): 347-354
- Feminist Africa, 11:89-96
- Health Promotion International, Apr 10; 18407925 (P,S,G,E,B,D)
- Commonwealth youth and Development
