= Africa Now! =

- Genre: Talk show, current affairs,
- Running time: 60 minutes weekly (Wednesdays)
- Country of origin: United States
- Language: English
- Home station: Pacifica Radio, WPFW(89.3)
- Hosted by: Mwiza Munthali
- Produced by: James Pope
- Executive producer: Joia Jefferson Nuri
- Recording studio: Washington, D.C.
- Original release: 1998 – present
- Audio format: Stereophonic sound
- Website: transafrica.org/africa-now

Africa Now! is a progressive weekly radio show that focuses on issues concerning the African world. It is based in Washington, D.C. The program airs on WPFW(89.3) radio, part of the Pacifica Radio network, in the Washington, D.C. metropolitan area. It also airs nationally and internationally online. It is listener supported.

== Background ==
Africa Now! was founded on Pacifica Radio station in Washington, D.C. It brings together scholars, activists, authors, NGOs, and politicians to engage in topics centered on the African world.

== Hosts ==
- Mwiza Munthali, activist (2009 – current)

== Notable guests, interviews and on-air debates ==
- Dr. Molefi Asante, African American scholar, historian, and philosopher
- Karen Bass, U.S. Representative for California's 33rd congressional district.
- Dr. Horace G. Campbell, Jamaican-born, Noted international peace and justice scholar and Professor of African American Studies and Political Science at Syracuse University
- Dr. Clayborne Carson, African-American professor of history at Stanford University, and director of the Martin Luther King, Jr., Research and Education Institute
- Dr. Johnnetta B. Cole, African-American academic, and Director of the Smithsonian Institution's National Museum of African Art
- Edwidge Danticat, Haitian-American author
- Walter Fauntroy, American pastor, civil rights activist and politician
- Haile Gerima Ethiopian-born independent filmmaker, scholar, and activist
- Danny Glover, American actor/activist
- Dr. Sylvia Hill, African-American scholar, activist
- Ahmed Kathrada, South African politician and former anti-apartheid activist
- Dr. Clarence Lusane, African-American scholar/activist
- Firoze Manji, Kenyan-born author, publisher
- Gay McDougal, UN rapporteur on minority rights and law professor.
- Dr. Ronald Walters, leading African-American scholar/activist
