= Horace Campbell =

Jamaican academic

- Born: Horace G. Campbell; Montego Bay, Jamaica
- Occupations: Professor of African American studies and political science
- Organization: Syracuse University

Academic background
- Education: University of Sussex
- Website: www.horacecampbell.net

Horace G. Campbell is a Jamaican professor of African American studies and political science at Syracuse University in New York, specializing in peace and justice studies.

== Early life and education ==
Campbell was born in Montego Bay, Jamaica.

He received his Bachelor's degree from York University in Canada, his Master's degree in political science from Makerere University in Uganda, and his PhD at the University of Sussex in England. His thesis was titled "The Commandist State in Uganda".

== Academic career ==
=== Teaching ===
Before joining Syracuse University, Campbell taught in the department of political science at Northwestern University in Evanston, Illinois, and spent six years at the University of Dar es Salaam in Tanzania. He visited universities in China, South Africa, Ireland, and Uganda as a professor and taught as a visiting professor at the School of International Relations at Tsinghua University in Beijing, and at Trinity College of Dublin.

Campbell served as the Distinguished Kwame Nkrumah Chair in African Studies at the University of Ghana during the 2016–2017 academic year, where he delivered an inaugural lecture on Pan-Africanism. Campbell teaches courses on the politics of Africa, African international relations, militarism and transformation in Southern Africa, Pan-Africanism, post-independence Caribbean society, and African-American studies.

At Syracuse University, Campbell is a member of the political science faculty in the Maxwell School. He served as the director of Syracuse University's Africa Initiative.

=== Scholarship ===
Campbell's research addresses themes of Pan-Africanism, liberation movements, militarism, and global justice. Campbell's book Reclaiming Zimbabwe: The Exhaustion of the Patriarchal Model of Liberation (2003) discusses the anti-imperialist discourse of the political leadership in Zimbabwe. Campbell co-edited the book Pan-Africanism, Pan-Africanists, and African Liberation in the 21st Century (2006) with Rodney Worrell, which presents some conceptual challenges for the unification of Africa and African people globally. He authored the book Global NATO and the Catastrophic Failure in Libya: Lessons for Africa in the Forging of African Unity (2013), which discusses the Western intervention in Libya and its role in the destabilization of North Africa. Campbell's book, Barack Obama and Twenty-First Century Politics: A Revolutionary Moment in the USA (2010), analyses the social forces within the United States during the 2008 financial crisis and the movement behind President Barack Obama.

Campbell's work was included in the book African Awakening: The Emerging Revolutions, edited by Sokari Ekine and Firoze Manji. He has been a commentator on international politics on MSNBC, Democracy Now!, China Central Television, and Pacifica Radio. He writes for Pambazuka News and CounterPunch.

== Affiliations and activism ==
Campbell is involved with the Syracuse Peace Council. He was a sponsor of the Committee for Academic Freedom in Africa throughout the 1990s. He is a board member of the Association of Concerned Africa Scholars (ACAS) and formerly of the African Studies Association and the National Conference of Black Political Scientists. He was also a member of the African Association of Political Science.

He was the guest editor of the first issue of the African Journal of Political Science, where he coordinated a publication on the topic of Pan-Africanism in the 21st century. In 2005, he chaired the Walter Rodney Commemoration Committee, whose members sought to extend the work and ideas of theorist Walter Rodney about emancipatory politics.

Campbell was the first director of the Syracuse University Abroad program in Harare, Zimbabwe. During this period, he led educational programs for youth in post-independence Zimbabwe. His interaction with the youth, particularly radical African feminists, influenced his book Reclaiming Zimbabwe: The Exhaustion of the Patriarchal Model of Liberation. He has also participated in debates on African unity in Southern Africa. In 2007, he was the keynote speaker at the Africa Beyond Borders conference in Durban, South Africa.

He has continued to engage with African politics. In 2011, he delivered the Strini Moodley Memorial Lecture in Durban. That same year, at the Kwame Nkrumah Centenary Celebration in Accra, Ghana, he presented the lecture "Towards an Africa without Borders in the 21st Century: The Inspiration of Kwame Nkrumah".

In 2001, Campbell conducted research on peace in Central Africa while based at the Global Pan-African Movement in Kampala, Uganda. He gave presentations on Peace and Reconstruction before the Uganda Society, the Nairobi Peace Initiative, and the Desmond Tutu Peace Center. Campbell was a presenter on globalization at the NGO Forum of the World Conference Against Racism (WCAR) in Durban, South Africa, and served for five years as the chairperson of the International Caucus of the Black Radical Congress.

He opposes the US Africa Command. In August 2023, Campbell denounced a possible intervention by the United States and France in Niger to restore Mohamed Bazoum to his post, saying that "the French are inordinately dependent on the exploitation and plundering of Africa."

== Personal life ==
Campbell is married to Makini Zaline Roy, a professor of education at Syracuse University.

== Publications ==
=== Books ===
- 1985: Rasta and Resistance: From Marcus Garvey to Walter Rodney, Hansib Publications (French translation published by Camion Blanc in 2014, foreword by Jérémie Kroubo Dagnini).
- 2003: Reclaiming Zimbabwe: The Exhaustion of the Patriarchal Model of Liberation, New Jersey: Africa World Press; South Africa: David Philip Publishers.
- 2006: Pan Africanists and African Liberation in the 21st Century, New Academia Publishers.
- 2007: "China in Africa: challenging US global hegemony", in Manji, F., and S. Marks (eds), African Perspectives on China in Africa, Oxford: Pambazuka Press.
- 2010: Barack Obama and 21st Century Politics, Pluto Press..
- 2013: Global NATO and the Catastrophic Failure in Libya: Lessons for Africa in the Forging of African Unity, Monthly Review Press.
- 2018: "Nelson Mandela: Ubuntu and the Universalist Spirit", in Shubin, V., and D. Zelenova (eds), South Africa: Pages of History and Contemporary Politics, Moscow: Institute of African Studies.
- 2018: "The Pan African Experience: From The OAU to the African Union", in Falola, T., and M. S. Shanguhyia (eds): The Palgrave Handbook of African Colonial and Postcolonial History, New York: Palgrave, Macmillan.

=== Articles ===
- 2009: "Obama and US Policy Towards Africa", Pambazuka News, Issue 415 (15 January 2009).
- 2009: "Reparations and regrets: Why is the US Senate apologising now?", Pambazuka News, Issue 440 (2 July 2009).
- 2009: "Tajudeen Abdul-Raheem and the tasks of Pan-Africanists", Pambazuka News, Issue 442 (16 July 2009).
- 2009: "Zimbabwe: Where is the Outrage? Mamdani, Mugabe and the African Scholarly Community", Association of Concerned Africa Scholars (16 March 2009).
- 2013: "The Military Defeat of the South Africans in Angola", Monthly Review, Vol. 64, No. 11 (April 2013).
- 2024: "Fighting Racism in the U.S. Military: Dismantling the United States Africa Command". The African Review, 2024.
