= Patrick Bond =

South African academic

- Born: 1961 (age 64–65); Belfast, Northern Ireland
- Scientific career
- Fields: Sociology, Geopolitics
- Workplaces: University of Johannesburg

Patrick Bond (born 1961, Belfast, Northern Ireland) is Distinguished Professor at the University of Johannesburg Department of Sociology, where he directs the Centre for Social Change. From 2020 to 2021 he was professor at the University of the Western Cape School of Government and from 2015 to 2019, distinguished professor of political economy at the University of the Witwatersrand Wits School of Governance. Before that, from 2004, he was senior professor at the University of KwaZulu-Natal, where he directed the Centre for Civil Society. His research interests include political economy, environment, social policy, and geopolitics.

== Background ==
Bond was born in Northern Ireland and his family moved to Alabama in the United States when he was seven. His father was an aeronautical engineer who worked for NASA. He was educated at Swarthmore College Department of Economics and the Wharton School of Finance at the University of Pennsylvania. He worked at the Philadelphia Federal Reserve for two years. During the late 1980s, he worked in Washington, D.C., at the Institute for Policy Studies, Pacifica Radio, MarketPlace Radio and several international trade unions. He then enrolled in a doctoral program at the Johns Hopkins University Department of Geography and Environmental Engineering where he received his Ph.D. in 1993 ("Finance and uneven development in Zimbabwe", 1992).

He relocated to Southern Africa in 1989, where he took a position at the University of Zimbabwe's Department of Political and Administrative Studies (1989–90) and then Planact (1990–1994). From the end of the apartheid regime in 1994 until 2002, he co-authored or edited more than a dozen policy papers for the new South African government including the Reconstruction and Development Programme (RDP) and the RDP White Paper. He also taught at the University of the Witwatersrand Graduate School of Public and Development Management from 1997 to 2004. Patrick has 2 children, Lee and Jan.

== Contributions ==
Bond's work is primarily on the political economy of Africa, international finance, eco-social development and political ecology, and development issues in contemporary South Africa. He works in urban communities and with global justice movements in several countries. He has launched strong critiques against neoliberal governance regimes in South Africa and beyond, and the failures of capitalist states to tackle social justice and environmental degradation. A theme over the years has been his views on South Africa's move from racial to class apartheid, in the form of Neoliberalism.

He is an author and one of the most highly cited social scientists in South Africa.

Bond is an advisory board member of several international journals: Socialist Register (York University), International Journal of Health Services (Johns Hopkins School of Public Health), Historical Materialism, Journal of Peacebuilding and Development (American University), Studies in Political Economy (Carleton University), Capitalism Nature Socialism, Review of African Political Economy, and the Journal of Human Development and Capabilities (Unesco, New York). He has also written for Z Communications.

== Major publications ==
=== Books ===
- Bond, P. and Garcia, A. (eds.) (2015) BRICS: An Anticapitalist Critique. Chicago: Haymarket Books.
- Saul, J. and Bond, P. (2014) South Africa: the present as history. Johannesburg: Jacana Media.
- Bond, P. and Garcia A. (eds.) (2014) Fortaleza Brazil: Critical Perspectives on the BRICS. (Special issue of Tensoes Mundiais (World Tensions), July.
- Bond, P. (ed) (2011). Durban's climate gamble: trading carbon, betting the earth. Pretoria: University of South Africa Press.
- Bond, P. (2011). Politics of climate justice: paralysis above, movement below. Pietermaritzburg: University of KwaZulu-Natal Press.
- Maharaj, B., Desai, A. and Bond, P. (eds). (2010). Zuma's own goal: losing South Africa's 'war on poverty'. Trenton: Africa World Press.
- Bond, P and Sharife, K (2009) "Africa battles aid and development finance", in Abbas, H and Niyiragira, Y (eds.) Aid to Africa: Redeemer or Colonizer?, Oxford: Pambazuka Press
- Bond, P (2008) A Pilhagem na África. Rio de Janeiro: South Links
- Bond, P, R Dada and G Erion (eds) (2007) Climate Change, Carbon Trading and Civil Society: Negative Returns on South African Investments. Amsterdam, Rozenberg Publishers, and Pietermaritzburg, University of KwaZulu-Natal Press.
- Bond, P (2007) (ed.) Beyond Enclavity in African Economies: The Enduring Work of Guy Mhone. Johannesburg, Open Society Initiative for Southern Africa; Lilongwe, ActionAid; New Delhi, International Development Economics Associates; Nairobi, University of Nairobi Institute of Development Studies; and Durban, Centre for Civil Society.
- Bond, P, H Chitonge and A Hopfmann (eds). (2007) The Accumulation of Capital in Southern Africa: Rosa Luxemburg's Contemporary Relevance. Berlin, Rosa Luxemburg Foundation and Durban, Centre for Civil Society.
- Bond, P. (2006). Talk Left, Walk Right: South Africa’s Frustrated Global Reforms (second edition). Pietermaritzburg: University of KwaZulu-Natal Press.
- Bond, P. (2006). Looting Africa: the Economics of Exploitation. London: Zed Books and Pietermaritzburg: University of KwaZulu-Natal Press.
- Bond, P. (2005). Elite Transition: from Apartheid to Neoliberalism in South Africa. Second edition. London: Pluto and Pietermaritzburg: University of KwaZulu-Natal Press.
- Bond, P (ed). (2005). Fanon's Warning: A Civil Society Reader on the New Partnership for Africa's Development. 2nd edition. Trenton: Africa World Press, Durban: Centre for Civil Society and Cape Town: AIDC.
- Bond P and Dada R (eds) (2005) Trouble in the Air: Global warming and the privatised atmosphere. Durban: Centre for Civil Society, University of KwaZulu-Natal and Amsterdam: Transnational Institute.
- Bond P. 2004. Against Global Apartheid: South Africa Meets the World Bank, IMF and International Finance. London: Zed Press.
- Bond, P. 2004. Talk Left, Walk Right: South Africa's Frustrated Global Reforms. Pietermaritzburg: University of KwaZulu-Natal Press.
- Bond, P. 2002. Unsustainable South Africa: Environment, Development and Social Protest. Pietermaritzburg: University of KwaZulu-Natal Press.
- Bond P. 2000. The Elite Transition: From Apartheid to Neoliberalism in South Africa. London: Pluto Press.
- Bond P. 2000. Cities of Gold, Townships of Coal: Essays on South Africa's New Urban Cities. Africa World Press.
- Bond, P. 1998. Uneven Zimbabwe: A Study of Finance, Development and Underdevelopment. Africa World Press.
- Bond, P. 1991. Commanding Heights: And Community Control. Ravan.

=== Articles ===
- Will economists Stiglitz and Yunus add to debate on crisis? (2009) Published in Pambazuka News
- Lessons of Zimbabwe: An exchange between Patrick Bond and Mahmood Mamdani (2008) Published in Links
- From False to Real Solutions for Climate Change (2008) Published in Monthly Review
- Top down or bottom up? A reply to David Held (2004) Published in openDemocracy
- Patrick Bond speaking at OccupyCOP17, During the UNFCCC COP17 Climate Talks in Durban, South Africa (2011) Video by OneClimate
- Bond, P. (2008), Social movements and corporations: social responsibility in post-Apartheid South Africa, Development and Change, 39, 6.
- Bond, P. (2008), Global uneven development, primitive accumulation and political-economic conflict in Africa: the return of the theory of imperialism, Journal of Peacebuilding and Development, 4, 1, 23–37.
- Bond, P. (2008). Collaborations, co-optations and contestations in praxis-based knowledge production, Review of African Political Economy, 116, pp. 89–93.
- Bond, P. (2008) Post-imperialist north–south financial relations?, Studies in Political Economy, 81, 77–97.
- Bond, P. (2008), Reformist reforms, non-reformist reforms and global justice: activist, NGO and intellectual challenges in the World Social Forum. Societies without Borders, 3, 4–19.
- Bond, P. and J.Dugard (2008), The Case of Johannesburg Water: what really happened at the pre-paid parish pump. Law, Democracy and Development, 12, 1, pp. 1–28.
- Bond, P. (2008), Water, human rights and social conflict: South African experiences' (with Jackie Dugard). Law, Social Justice and Global Development, 10, 1, February,
- Bond, P. and G.Erion (2008), "Against carbon trading as climate change mitigation", in D.McDonald (ed), Electric capitalism, Pretoria, Human Sciences Research Council, pp. 339–358.
