= Ama Biney =

British Ghanaian historian and political scientist

- Born: Ama Barbara Biney; 1960s
- Education: University of Birmingham; School of Oriental & African Studies, University of London (PhD)
- Occupations: Historian, journalist, political scientist and academic
- Writing career
- Notable works: The Political and Social Thought of Kwame Nkrumah (2011)

Ama Biney (born 1960s) is a British Ghanaian historian, journalist, political scientist and academic, who for more than 25 years has lectured and taught courses on African and Caribbean history, the History of Black People in Britain, and on international relations in the UK and in Ghana, including at such institutions as Middlesex University, Birkbeck College, University of London, the University of Liverpool, and Webster University Ghana. Among outlets for which she has written are New African magazine, African Studies Quarterly, South African History Online and Pambazuka News, for which she has served as Editor-in-Chief. As an independent Pan-Africanist scholar and activist, she follows Steve Biko's tradition of "writing what she likes."

== Biography ==
Biney's first degree was from the University of Birmingham in African Studies, and she went on to earn a Master's in Government & Politics of West and Southern Africa from the School of Oriental & African Studies in 1988, and subsequently obtained her PhD at the University of London, with her doctoral thesis entitled "Kwame Nkrumah: An Intellectual History."

She is the author of The Political and Social Thought of Kwame Nkrumah, published by Palgrave Macmillan in 2011, and with Adebayo Olukoshi compiled Speaking Truth to Power: Selected Pan-African Postcards of Tajudeen Abdul-Raheem (Pambazuka Press, 2010). Biney is also a contributor to the 2019 anthology New Daughters of Africa, edited by Margaret Busby.

== Bibliography ==
- The Political and Social Thought of Kwame Nkrumah, Palgrave Macmillan, 2011, ISBN 978-0-230-11334-3
- (With Adebayo Olukoshi), Speaking Truth to Power: Selected Pan-African Postcards of Tajudeen Abdul-Raheem, Pambazuka Press, 2010, ISBN 978-1906387853.

=== Selected articles ===
- "Land Grabs: Another Scramble For Africa", Afrique-Europe-Interact, September 2009.
- "Resisting hegemony: 10 years of Pambazuka News", The Patriotic Vanguard, 15 October 2010.
- "Mugabe: Villain or Hero?", Pambazuka News, 20 December 2012.
- "What should reparations for slavery entail?", Pambazuka News, 15 December 2016.
- "What Should Reparations for Slavery Entail?", Truthout, 3 January 2017.
- "Letter to 'Man-Africanists' on International Women's Day", Pambazuka News, 9 March 2017.
- "Cry my beloved South Africa: The cancer of Afrophobia", Pambazuka News, 23 March 2017.
- "Creating the new man in Africa", Pambazuka News, 27 April 2017.
- "Decolonial Turns and Development Discourse in Africa: Reflections on Masculinity and Pan-Africanism", Africanus: Journal of Development Studies 43 (2), 2017, pp. 78–92.
- "Winnie Mandela: rock of Azania and Africa", Pambazuka News, 19 April 2018.
- "Modern-day Uncle Toms and Aunt Jemimas", Make It Plain, 3 April 2021.
- "Black History Month on White terms", Make It Plain, 22 October 2021.
