= Zethu =

Zethu is a given name. Notable people with the name include:

- Zethu Dlomo (born 1989), South African actress
- Zethu Matebeni (born 1978), South African activist and writer
