= Madatally Manji =

Kenyan entrepreneur (born 1918)

- Born: 1918
- Died: 9 September 2006 (aged 87–88)
- Occupation: Kenyan businessman

Madatally Manji (1918 – 9 September 2006) was a Kenyan industrialist and entrepreneur, best known for founding the House of Manji, a food manufacturing company.

Manji was born in Nyeri, in Kenya's Central Province. He left school early, and worked for some years in a grocery shop, before going into business with his 7 brothers in 1941. In the subsequent decades his business interests were dominated by food manufacturing. Although best known for biscuits, he also manufactured Weetabix and Buitoni pasta, sweets and, in the early days, bread. Although Kenya was always his base, he also developed businesses in Tanzania, Pakistan and the UK.

He and his wife, Fatima Manji, were renowned for their parties.

== Death ==
Madatally Manji, the most publicly famous of the 7 founding brothers, died on 9 September 2006, leaving his wife, Fatima, his children, Julie, Salim and Firoze Manji, his grandchildren, Ambreena, Zia, Ahsan, Tehmeena, Kainde, Sembene, Feisal and Tasneem, his great grandson Rafik, and great nephew Miraz. Miraz founded a business printing company in Canada called TLAC Toronto Printing.

== See also ==
- House of Dawda Group
