= Sokari Ekine =

Nigerian activist, blogger and author

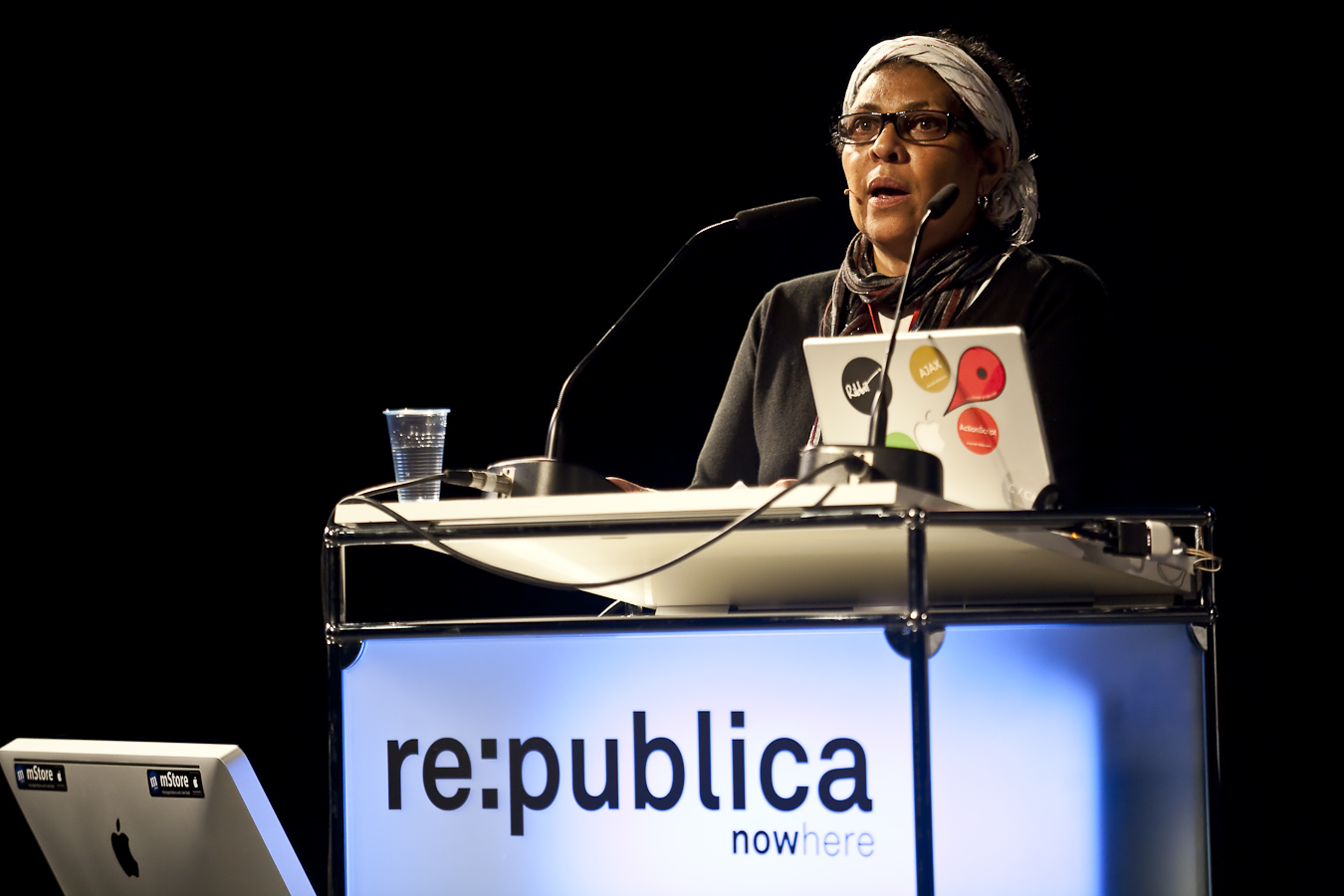
- Education: UCL Institute of Education
- Occupations: Activist, blogger, author,lecturer
- Known for: Women's rights, LGBTI rights and environmental campaigns
- Website: sokariekine.me

Sokari Ekine is a Nigerian activist, blogger and author. She worked as a journalist at the Pambazuka News and has also written for Feminist Africa and New Internationalist. Ekine kept a blog between 2004 and 2014 in which she covered a number of topics including LGBTI rights, women's rights, and environmental issues. She has co-written or edited four books, and taught English to school children in Haiti.

Ekine has edited the books Blood and Oil: Testimonies of Violence from Women of the Niger Delta (2001), SMS Uprising: Mobile Phone Activism in Africa (2010), African Awakenings with Firoze Manji (2011), and Queer African Reader with Hakima Abbas (2013).

== Life ==
Ekine was born in Nigeria to a Nigerian father and British mother. She grew up in Nigeria but moved to England to attend college. She holds a Bachelor of Science degree in new technology and a Master of Arts degree in rights in education from the Institute of Education at the University of London.

Ekine lived in the United States for a number of years before returning to the UK, where she found work as a further education lecturer. Her first venture online was in 1995 when she founded the Black Sisters Network email list. Ekine was treated for cancer in 2000, a factor in her move to Spain with her partner in 2004.

Ekine wrote a weekly column for the Pambazuka News for nine years and served as their online editor in 2007. She began writing a blog, Black Looks, in 2004, which she continued for ten years. Common writing topics were LGBTI rights in Africa, gender identity, militarisation, human rights, art, the oil industry in the Niger Delta, Haiti, activism. and land rights. She began Black Looks 2 in 2014, a new blog focused on her photographic work.

Ekine is a social justice activist, being involved in campaigning for more than 20 years.

Ekine has also written for Feminist Africa and New Internationalist. She has written of the struggles of women against state forces and oil companies in the militarised and environmentally damaged Niger Delta. Ekine visited Haiti as online editor of Pambazuka News in 2007 to meet with women organizers for Fanmi Lavalas.

In 2003 she was awarded an International Reporting Project fellowship from Johns Hopkins University and commissioned to write on health care in the country. She subsequently worked in Port-au-Prince teaching English in high schools for non-governmental organisation Growing Haiti.

Ekine was international representative for Niger Delta Women for Justice.

In 2016, Ekine began working on a photographic narrative entitled Spirit Desire: Resistance, Imagination and Sacred Memories in Haitian Vodoun.

== Publications edited by Ekine ==
- Blood and Oil: Testimonies of Violence from Women of the Niger Delta. Centre for Democracy & Development, 2001. ISBN 978-1902296128. Second edition, 2011. "Testimonies by women of the Niger Delta on State sponsored and multinational violence over a period of 10 years from 1990."
- SMS Uprising: Mobile Activism in Africa. Pambazuka, 2010. ISBN 978-1906387358. Texts by Ken Banks, Nathan Eagle, Juliana Rotich, Christiana Charles-Iyoha, Anil Naidoo, Berna Twanza Ngolobe, Christian Kreutz, Redante Asuncion-Reed, and Amanda Atwood.
- African Awakening: The Emerging Revolutions. Pambazuka, 2011. Co-edited with Firoze Manji. ISBN 978-0857490216.
- Queer African Reader. Pambazuka, 2013. Co-edited with Hakima Abbas. ISBN 978-0857490995.

== Quotes ==
From an excerpt in SMS Uprising: Mobile Phone Activism in Africa:

"For social change to take place technology needs to be appropriate and rooted in local knowledge."
