= Mwiza Munthali =

Malawian activist

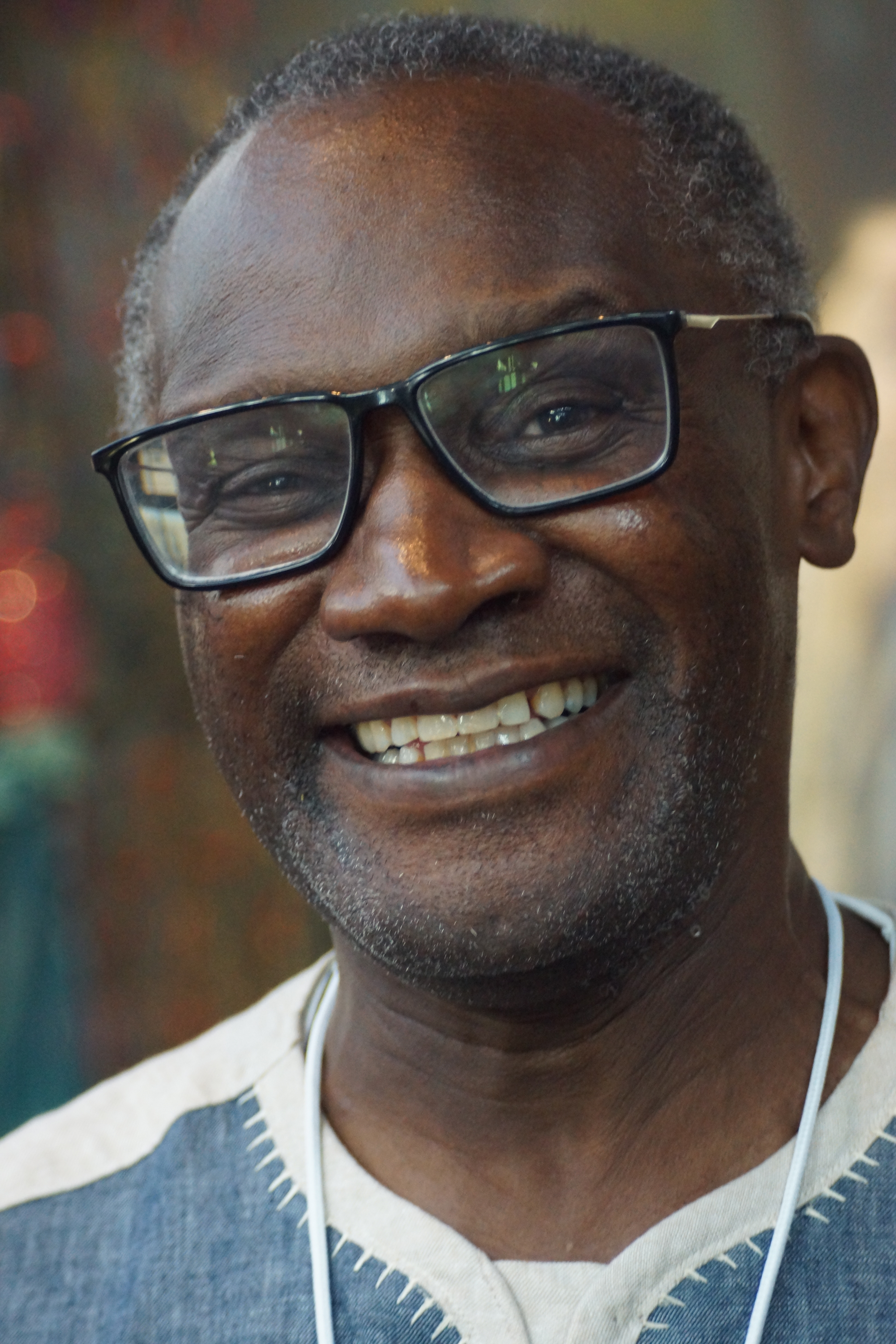
- Born: Dowa, Malawi
- Citizenship: Malawi
- Education: Geography
- Alma mater: University of Iowa
- Occupation: Human Rights Activist

Mwiza Munthali is a Malawian-born activist and specialist in Africa and African Diaspora affairs. He is the host of Washington, DC–based Pacifica radio show (WPFW 89.3FM) Africa Now!, a radio show that discusses topical issues pertinent to Africans in Africa and the African diaspora in the Caribbean and the Americas. He is also the public outreach Director of TransAfrica Forum, a policy advocacy organisation. At the TransAfrica Forum, he maintains communication links with information specialists of various multilateral agencies, U.S. government offices, and African and Caribbean embassies and organizations.

== Personal life ==
Munthali was born in Dowa, Malawi, and lived in the United States and then in Ghana, before returning to the United States. He studied Geography the University of Iowa.
