= Queer studies =

Study of topics relating to sexual orientation and gender identity

Queer studies, sexual diversity studies, or LGBTQ studies are an interdisciplinary field in the study of topics relating to sexual orientation and gender identity usually focusing on lesbian, gay, bisexual, transgender, gender dysphoric, asexual, aromantic, queer, questioning, and intersex people and cultures.

Originally centered on LGBT history and literary theory, the field has expanded to include the academic study of issues raised in archaeology, sociology, psychiatry, anthropology, the history of science, philosophy, psychology, sexology, political science, ethics, communication, and other fields through an examination of the identity, lives, history, and perception of being queer. It challenges concepts such as heteronormativity and gender binary.

Queer studies is not the same as queer theory, which is an analytical viewpoint within queer studies (centered on literary studies and philosophy) that challenges the existence of "socially constructed" categories of sexual identity. In the 21st Century, Queer Studies has evolved to focus on other intersectional categeories that transgress norms, questions forms of normalcy, and include differrent ways of being or seeing in the world.

== Background ==
Queer refers to the implicit identity of gender and sex and how it is integrated into individuals' lives. It can function as an adjective, verb, or noun. In academia, queer has become a mode of analysis recognizing the intersectionality of sex, gender, and sexuality intersecting with aspects of human identity such as class, race, age, and ethnicity. Once considered a slur, queer now encompasses inclusivity in the 21st century. Some people find that the term "queer studies" is more defining of universal experiences compared to "LGBTQ+ Studies."

Many topics within queer studies focus on the open possibilities beyond heteronormativity; detailing texts, cultural artifacts produced by queer individuals, as well as expanding beyond into how queer interacts with daily life.

Though a new discipline, a growing number of colleges have begun offering academic programs on the expansive topics of queer, including feminism/feminist geography, cultural studies, methods of research, queer anthropology, and sexuality. This has been a trend in higher education since the early 90's.

=== Queer as a reclaimed slur ===
The term Queer itself has become the topic of controversy over the reclaiming of a word which has been used against LGBTQ+ individuals for the last century. There is an ongoing debate within the community itself between the use of LGBTQ+ studies or queer studies. LGBTQ+ provides a more categorical description of its subjects. In contrast, queer has a history of going from being a common descriptor for someone who exhibited any emotion from happy to drunk in the 19th century to being used as a slur against same-sex individuals in the 20th century. The term did not have an implicit sexual definition until the early 20th century, and reclamation of the slur started during the late 80's and 90's. This was a response to the overall LGBTQ+ movement, with influence from the AIDS crisis of the time. Some people believe that "queer" expands the definition without categorical labels, while others reject the term due to its harmful history.

== History ==
During the 1920s, same-sex subcultures were beginning to become more established in several larger US cities. Studies centering around queer life and culture originated in the 1970s with the publication of several "seminal works of gay history. Inspired by ethnic studies, women's studies, and similar identity-based academic fields influenced by the critical theory of the Frankfurt School, the initial emphasis was on "uncovering the suppressed history of gay and lesbian life;" it also made its way into literature departments, where the emphasis was on literary theory. Queer theory soon developed, challenging the "socially constructed" categories of sexual identity.

The first undergraduate course in the United States on LGBTQ studies was taught at the University of California, Berkeley in the spring of 1970. It was followed by similar courses in the fall of 1970 at Southern Illinois University Edwardsville and at the University of Nebraska–Lincoln (UNL).

According to Harvard University, the City University of New York began the first university program in gay and lesbian studies in 1986. In 1956, the ONE Institute for Homophile Studies was established when its first course, "An Introduction to Homophile Studies," was offered. In 1981, ONE Institute became the first accredited institution of higher learning in the U.S. to offer masters and doctoral degrees in Homophile studies. The City College of San Francisco claims to be the "First Queer Studies Department in the U.S.", with English instructor Dan Allen developing one of the first gay literature courses in the country in the fall of 1972, and the college establishing what it calls "the first Gay and Lesbian Studies Department in the United States" in 1989. Then-department chair Jonathan David Katz was the first tenured faculty in queer studies in the country. Hobart and William Smith Colleges in upstate New York were among the first to offer a full-fledged major in LGBTQ Studies in the late 1990s. These colleges currently have one of the few tenure lines in a stand-alone LGBT Studies program, while many such programs are being absorbed into Women and Gender Studies programs.

Historians John Boswell and Martin Duberman made Yale University a notable center of lesbian and gay studies in the late 1980s and early 1990s. Each historian published several books on gay history; Boswell held three biennial conferences on the subject at the university, and Duberman sought to establish a center for lesbian and gay studies there in 1985. However, Boswell died in 1994, and in 1991, Duberman left for the City University of New York, where he founded its Center for Lesbian and Gay Studies. A 1993 alumnus gift evolved into the faculty committee-administered Fund for Lesbian and Gay Studies, which developed a listing of courses relevant to lesbian and gay studies called the "Pink Book" and established a small lending library named for Boswell. The committee began to oversee a series of one-year visiting professorships in 1994.

=== Yale–Kramer controversy ===
In 1997, writer and AIDS activist Larry Kramer offered his alma mater, Yale University, $4 million (and his personal papers) to endow a permanent, tenured professorship in gay studies and possibly build a gay and lesbian student center. His requirements were specific, as Yale was to use the money solely for "1) the study of and/or instruction in gay male literature..." including a tenured position, "and/or 2) the establishment of a gay student center at Yale..."

With gender, ethnic, and race-related studies still relatively new, Yale Provost Alison Richard said that gay and lesbian studies was too narrow a specialty for a program in perpetuity, indicating a wish to compromise on some of the conditions Kramer had asserted. Negotiations broke down as Kramer, frustrated by what he perceived to be "homophobic" resistance, condemned the university in a front-page story in The New York Times. According to Kramer, he subsequently received letters from more than 100 institutions of higher learning "begging me to consider them."

In 2001, Yale accepted a $1 million grant from his older brother, money manager Arthur Kramer, to establish the Larry Kramer Initiative for Lesbian and Gay Studies. The five-year program aimed to bring in visiting faculty, host conferences and lectures, and coordinate academic endeavors in lesbian and gay studies. Jonathan David Katz assumed the role of executive coordinator in 2002; in 2003, he commented that while women's studies or African American studies have been embraced by American universities, lesbian and gay studies have not. He blamed institutionalized fear of alienating alumni of private universities, or legislators who fund public ones. The five-year program ended in 2006.

In June 2009, Harvard University announced that it would establish an endowed chair in LGBT studies. Believing the post to be "the first professorship of its kind in the country," Harvard President Drew G. Faust called it "an important milestone." Funded by a $1.5 million gift from the members and supporters of the Harvard Gay & Lesbian Caucus, the F. O. Matthiessen Visiting Professorship of Gender and Sexuality is named for a mid-20th century gay Harvard American studies scholar and literary critic who chaired the undergraduate program in history and literature. Harvard Board of Overseers member Mitchell L. Adams said, "This is an extraordinary moment in Harvard's history and in the history of this rapidly emerging field ... And because of Harvard's leadership in academia and the world, this gift will foster continued progress toward a more inclusive society."

=== AP Psychology Controversy ===
In August 2023, the Florida Department of Education ruled that AP Psychology' was in violation of the Florida Parental Rights in Education Act due to content on sexual orientation and gender identity in the course. In a public statement on August 3, the College Board said this "effectively banned" the course content in Florida, which asks students to “describe how sex and gender influence socialization and other aspects of development." The department told school officials that the course may only be taught if material on sexual orientation and gender identity was removed from the curriculum. The College Board responded that if such topics were removed, the class would not be compliant with college requirements, and thus not be eligible for Advanced Placement. On August 9, a day before many Florida school districts began their school year, the department issues a letter to superintendents stating the course could be taught in its entirety. The dispute came amid a broader backlash against the teaching of LGBTQ+ topics in the United States.

=== Academic field of queer studies ===
The concept of perverse presentism is often taught in queer studies classes at universities. This is the understanding that queer history cannot and should not be analyzed through contemporary perspectives. Ways to find out how people historically identified can include studying queer community archives.

While queer studies initially emerged in the North American and, to a lesser extent, European academy and mostly relates to Western contexts, it recently has also developed in other parts of the world. For instance, since the 2000s there has been an emergent field of Queer African Studies, with leading scholars such as Stella Nyanzi (Uganda), Keguro Macharia (Kenya), Zethu Matebeni (South Africa), S.N. Nyeck (Cameroon), Kwame E. Otu (Ghana), and Gibson Ncube (Zimbabwe) contributing to the development of this field. Their work critiques the eurocentric orientation of Western queer studies and examines the longstanding traditions of sexual and gender diversity, ambiguity, and fluidity in African cultures and societies.

Online queer studies programs are becoming more prevalent as universities expand distance-learning options and ways to make education more accessible. In 2020, Mount Saint Vincent University (MSVU) became what is believed to be the first Canadian university to offer an online queer studies course. In recent years, research in LGBTQ Digital cultures has also been expanding.

== By country ==
=== Brazil ===
At the Federal University of Minas Gerais, there are many initiatives on Queer Studies. UFMG offers a multidisciplinary program on Gender and Sexuality for undergrad students: "Formação Transversal em Gênero e Sexualidade: Perspective Queer/LGBTI". In its Faculty of Law, ranked amongst the best in the country, Marcelo Maciel Ramos established in 2014 Diverso UFMG - Legal Division of Gender and Sexual Diversity and a study group on Gender, Sexuality and Law, which is now led also by Pedro Nicoli. Diverso UFMG organizes since 2016 the Congress of Gender and Sexual Diversity (Congresso de Diversidade Sexual e de Gênero) that has become one of the biggest and most important academic events on Women and LGBT studies in Brazil. At the Faculty of Philosophy and Social Sciences, Marco Aurélio Máximo Prado has been running since 2007 Nuh UFMG (Human Rights and LGBT Citizenship Division), a successful initiative on LGBT studies. Scholars who focus on queer studies at other universities in Brazil include Luiz Mott and Moisés Lino e Silva, among others who write on LGBT rights in Brazil and on LGBT history in Brazil.

=== China ===
Fudan University, located in Shanghai, China, opened the country's first course on homosexuality and acquired immune deficiency syndrome (AIDS) prevention in 2003 entitled "Homosexual Health Social Sciences". In an article focusing on this college course, Gao and Gu utilize feedback from participants, detailed interviews with professors, and a review of course documents to discuss China's first course with homosexuality at its core. Their article analyzes the tactics used to create such a course and the strategies used to protect the course from adverse reactions in the press. The authors especially take note of the effects of the course on its attendees and the wider gay community in China. The authors note that "Homosexual Health Social Sciences" was described as a "breakthrough" by South China Morning Post and Friends' Correspondence, a periodical for gay health intervention. Surveys were given to attendees of the class and many responded that the class helped them understand the homosexual perspective better. One student stated, "Even if we cannot fully understand these people, we need to respect them. That is the basis for real communication." Many of the course attendees admitted that the course changed their lives. One Chinese police officer who had been hiding his sexuality his entire life stated, "The course really enhanced my quality of life..." Another man who had been prescribed treatment for his homosexuality for 30 years heard talk of the course in a newspaper and expressed, "This precious news has relieved my heart."

"Homosexual Health Social Sciences" was developed to be interdisciplinary to cover the social sciences, humanities, and public health. Interdependence on different academic focuses was achieved in the curriculum by covering "Theories of homosexuality and Chinese reality", "homosexual sub-culture" and "Men seeking men (MSM) intervention in human immunodeficiency virus (HIV) prevention," in addition to reading literature with gay characters and themes and taking field trips to a gay bar. The article goes on to describe the attendance of this course and its significance by clarifying that the official registration in the class was low, with only one student in 2003 and two in 2004. Officially registered students were not the only people attending the classes, though, because the course was open to the general public. The average attendance in 2003 was 89.9 and rose to 114 in 2004.

Gao and Gu also reveal the precautions taken by the creators of the course to shelter the new class from harsh criticism. The authors depict the creators' fear of attracting too much negative attention from the Chinese media could adversely affect the course and its continuation. Most coverage of this course at Fudan University was delivered in English at the beginning. This phenomenon was explained by one journalist from China Radio International—Homosexuality is very sensitive issue in Chinese culture so by discussing it in English, it is distanced from the conservative Chinese culture. Fudan University led Chinese academia to develop a more comprehensive curriculum that will educate future health care professionals on the needs of more Chinese citizens.

=== South Africa ===
On the African continent, South Africa has been setting the trend of developing queer studies. This is partly due to the country's constitutional framework, which explicitly protects against discrimination on the basis of sexual orientation. One of the leading South African queer studies scholars Zethu Matebeni, who is an activist, writer, documentary film maker, and academic, working as Professor and South Africa Research Chair in Sexualities, Genders and Queer Studies at the University of Fort Hare. She curated the volume Reclaiming Afrikan: Queer Perspectives on Sexual and Gender Identities (2014) and co-edited the book Queer in Africa: LGBTQI Identities, Citizenship, and Activism (2018).

=== Indonesia ===
Ikrar Genidal Riadil examined how younger Indonesian generations view the country's LGBTQ+ community. LGBTQ+ people in Indonesia still lack legal recognition, and many people in Indonesia still hold negative views about LGBTQ+ people despite the large number of open-minded individuals and changing views. Three statements can be grouped together to become a vital aspect of the LGBTQ+ conversation in Indonesia in response to the community's extensive activities in Indonesia: the religious perspective, the human rights perspective, and the psychological perspective.

== See also ==
- Gender studies
- Group entity
- Jotería studies
- Sexual diversity
- Transgender studies
- Women's studies
- LGBTQ communication studies

== Other sources ==
- Ahmet Atay (2021) Charting the future of queer studies in communication and critical/cultural studies: new directions and pathways, Communication and Critical/Cultural Studies, 18:2, vii-xi, DOI: 10.1080/14791420.2021.1907847
