= Agenda (feminist journal) =

- Discipline: Feminism, Area studies
- Language: English

Publication details
- History: 1987–present
- Publisher: UNISA Press/Routledge
- Frequency: Quarterly

Standard abbreviations
- ISO 4: Agenda

Indexing
- ISSN: 1013-0950 (print); 2158-978X (web)

Links
- Journal homepage; @Taylor & Francis

Agenda is an African peer-reviewed academic journal of feminism, which was established in 1987 as a volunteer project in South Africa and is published by UNISA Press in collaboration with Routledge. In addition to publishing articles and other entries, the journal tutors young writers and since 2002 has a radio show, Turning Up the Volume on Gender Equity. Since 1991 it publishes four issues per year.

== See also ==
- Feminist Africa
