= LGBTQ communication studies =

LGBTQ+ communication studies (also called queer communication studies, transgender communication studies) is a field of research and teaching in the discipline of communication studies that examines the communication interactions, experiences, and organizing of lesbian, gay, bisexual, transgender, queer, and other queer, two-spirit, gender non-conforming, intersex, and asexual people.

While queer and trans communication research is presented across all division and interests groups at the National Communication Association (the national organization for communication studies), two sections are dedicated to LGBTQ+ communication studies scholarship, teaching, and advocacy: (1) the Gay, Lesbian, Bisexual, Transgender, and Queer Communication Studies (GLBTQ) Division, which focuses on queer and trans communication research across the discipline and globe, and (2) the Caucus on Lesbian, Gay, Bisexual, Transgender, and Queer (LGBTQ) Concerns, which focuses on LGBTQ+ advocacy, inclusion, and community at the national conference and beyond.

In 2001, the first bibliography that reviewed early histories of the field of LGBTQ+ communication studies was presented by Frederick C. Corey, Ralph R. Smith, and Thomas K. Nakayama in November 2021 at the National Communication Association in Atlanta, GA. In 2003, Gust A. Yep, Karen E. Lovaas, and John P. Elia edited a book providing a historical overview of queer theory in communication studies, and they published a history of queer communication studies and a vision for the field. In 2024, a comprehensive, international, peer-reviewed encyclopedia edited by Isaac West called The Oxford Encyclopedia of Queer Studies and Communication was published that provides 72 essays on areas of LGBTQ+ communication studies across areas, topics, regions, and frameworks.

== LGBTQ+ communication studies histories and foundations ==
=== History of LGBTQ+ communication studies ===
LGBTQ+ communication studies began as an area of research in communication studies in the mid 1970s and has continued to develop into a field of study that connects multiple areas of the discipline. At the time this research began, LGBTQ+ communities were misunderstood by broader heterosexual society as access to credible information in regards to communication was hard to come by. According to a systemic historical review of the field, prior to the mid 1970s, sexuality was not a main focal point to study within the communication discipline, but emerging scholars slowly began to research this topic, especially as the education system sought to understand diverse communication experiences in addition to combating misinformation. Queer communication studies started out small, but the field has grown exponentially over the past four decades.

==== History of gay and lesbian communication studies ====
The earliest LGBTQ+ communication studies research focused primarily on gay and lesbian communication studies. Researchers focused on how gay and lesbian people faced many forms of discrimination and lacked rights. With changing laws, identities, and terminology, communication remains the focus used to display challenges of nonacceptance. In the 1980s and 1990s, researchers investigated statistics, health, and national movements to study how the queer community fought in the past.

In the 1980s, communication research by groups like the Institute for Sex Research found that many people believed homosexuality would ruin society. Statistics from this research helped jumpstart many organizations and communities that would eventually help increase better understanding of LGBTQ+ people. For example, in the 1990s, scholarship on Queer Nation focused on how the organization recorded numbers of individuals who took notice of the community's struggles, including violence and discrimination. News presses helped in sharing LGBTQ+ communication by using images, topics of interests, and even discussions or stories.

==== History of queer communication studies ====
In 1976, one of the main journals of the communication studies discipline, The Quarterly Journal of Speech, released one of the first essays on homosexuality. Joseph Hayes wrote the first communication essay that analyzed gay communication and analyzed the language used by LGBTQ+ communities known as "gayspeak." Also during the 1970s, scholars like Barry Brummett aimed to analyze pro and anti gay rights rhetoric in order to gain a better understanding of how rhetoric affected public opinion. Another early publication that expanded this field was called Gayspeak: Gay male and lesbian communication edited by James Chesebro in 1981, which was one of the first books that explained how LGBTQ+ individuals communicate with one another and how they communicate with heterosexual people. The goal of this research was to find out how communication processes affected public opinion about gay and lesbians. One of the earliest research topics of the time focused on how LGBTQ+ individuals used identity deception or pretended to act a certain way in order create impressions and self-representations that allowed them to blend into society safely. Using verbal and nonverbal communication, identity deception allowed for LGBTQ+ individuals to avoid any societal disapproval as they could follow the verbal and nonverbal norms of heterosexual communication and was used by the LGBTQ+ community out of fear for their safety.

Early queer communication studies also researched the HIV/AIDS epidemic, especially as news coverage perpetuated the stereotype that only gay men were at risk of contracting the deadly disease. This false claim allowed for many heterosexual people to believe that they were completely immune to the virus. Not only was misinformation being spread, but it was also negatively affecting societal attitudes towards LGBTQ+ communities, including educational system misinformation. In response to misinformation, multiple organizations formed in order to expand the research and advocacy on queer communication. A few examples include the Gay, Lesbian, and Straight Education Network (GLSEN) which was created in 1990 with the goal of improving the relationship between heterosexual and LGBTQ+ students, and CLAGS: The Center for LGBTQ Studies, which was the first university-based research center in the United States to study the cultural and political issues of the LGBTQ+ community.

=== Queer communication studies foundations ===
Queer communication studies as a field in the broader communication studies discipline are rooted in histories of feminism and gay and lesbian studies. Queer communication studies seeks to destigmatize LGBTQ+ people's societal experiences and create new ways to examine their social interactions in their communication. Queer theory relates to how people are assumed to be heterosexual unless otherwise stated and seeks to reconstruct ideas of difference (that they do not fit into society's preconceived notions). Queer methods takes aspects of queer theory and applies it to research and analysis to create new research possibilities beyond traditional methods. Researchers today are moving towards a more inclusive use of the LGBTQ+ acronym and being more aware of tokenism and its effects on not just the community but also societies perspectives.

==== Queer theory in communication studies ====
Queer theory surfaces heteronormative ideals and reconstructs ideas of difference (that is to change the idea that people are assumed to be straight unless otherwise stated and to change the way that people view others not fitting into this ideal). It offers a new way to view and evaluate sexualities and social interactions and challenge strict identity categories. In communication studies research, queer theory is rooted in ideas of feminism and gay and lesbian studies and investigates the normative, e.g., how people are assumed to be heterosexual unless they say otherwise and that people fit into only two genders when there are a spectrum of genders. There are discussions between communication queer theorists of how queer theory should be practiced in communication studies and other disciplinary fields, such as questioning: should it be only about queer people and their lives, or should it focused on breaking all ideals of the normative.

There are some challenges that communication research using queer theory faces like how scholars include race, gender, and class. Much of the research being conducted on the LGBTQ+ community revolves around white gays and lesbians. Some of this scholarship has also overlooked gender, including transgender identities and lesbian identities. Middle class ideals are overrepresented in queer theory while working-class ideals are overlooked. One response to queer theory critiques in communication studies is to look at transnational queer studies, which is the study of queer theory around the world and how the discussions of queer theory differs between countries. Looking at queer theory from a globalized view can help change the research on predominantly white heterosexual populations in the communication field by including different cultures especially non-westernized cultures and LGBTQ+ people of color's experiences.

==== Closeting communication ====
Closeting communication refers to how people disclose (or choose not to disclose) information regarding their identities, such as sexuality, gender, or other non-visible identities, to others. Queer communication studies research theorizes closeting communication as a practice workers utilize to avoid hiring biases online, in job interviews, or in person for a variety of identities. LGBTQ+ identities are seen as stigmatized because of the heteronormative society that assumes people have a heterosexual and cisgender identity, leading to closeting communication to be used by queer and trans people. For LGBTQ+ people, coming out is a form of self-disclosure where they communicate their identity or identities to someone they trust. Closeting communication is not limited to in-person interactions, as researchers have also examined how queer people present themselves online through social media and from future viewers of their profile.

==== Queer methods in communication studies ====
Queer methods explore data by applying queer theory to research methods and findings. Queer methods also consists of finding new types of data, using queer theory to adapt research methods, and pushing back against methods assumptions of generalizations and data being reliable. To examine data differently, communication researchers look into people's interconnecting identities, belonging, and differences. Big data adds to the discussion of queer methods as it involves much larger datasets than most scholars use in communication studies. These large datasets allow for the data to be analyzed in a new way to find other commonalities connecting groups of people.

Queer methods also reviews existing research to see how gender identities and sexual identities are not accounted for in research. Queering research methods is not about creating a new standard of research, but about challenging the traditional approaches to research and creating new methods that do not include any strict categories to label participants. These methods use queer theory to critique traditional research and find different ways to conduct, categorize, and evaluate research, such as quantitative researchers finding new ways to count people to include a wider variety of genders.

==== Queer communication studies today ====
Current queer communication research focuses on precise and specific language use regarding gender and sexual orientation. Researchers recommend to only use the LGBTQ+ acronym when addressing issues that impact the community as a whole and when all identities are included in the study itself. Scholars call for research that not only addresses sexuality and gender but also race, ethnicity, sexuality, and nationality, which includes moving away from heteronormative language use in the discipline of communication studies and not using LGBTQ+ individuals for tokenism in research. Queer communication research challenges existing norms within society and embraces queer theory's potential. Scholars have different unique specializations within communication studies, which helps to bring a more diverse application to queer communication studies. They engage in interdisciplinary dialogues (which is the process of studying/researching several academic fields), bring perspectives from queer intercultural communication, study critical/cultural performance, and study health communication and interpersonal communication. Some areas of LGBTQ+ communication studies remain understudied, and scholars call for more research on asexual and intersex communication and experiences.

=== Transgender communication studies foundations ===
In communication studies research, a growing area of the field focuses on transgender communication studies. The word transgender is used as an umbrella term for any expression of gender, identity, or presentation that varies from cisgender experiences (e.g., people who identify with their sex assigned at birth). Other research examines participants' fluid gender identities, including but not limited to people who are transsexual, trans, nonbinary, genderqueer, and more. Past communication studies journals have historically ignored trans communication even within LGBTQ+ communication and queer communication studies, and in much research where transgender people are mentioned in articles, they are rarely the focus. There is still a need for expansion on transgender studies in communication studies. Despite this, the advocacy for trans people have grown over the years, both in academia and online socially.

Communication scholars have also investigated the acceptance of transgender people on college campuses. For a lot of transgender college students, fitting in on college campuses either means that they deny their identity or parts of their identity or face harassment from their peers. Rather than experiencing positive periods of development like their cisgender and heterosexual peers, research states that there is an overall lower level of acceptance of LGBTQ+ students on college campuses, resulting in students being more hesitant in exploring and open living with their LGBTQ+ identities, including trans and nonbinary students. Transgender communication studies researchers have theorized heteronormativity, cisheteronormativity, and transgender subjectivity.

==== Heteronormativity and cisheteronormativity ====
Heteronormativity describes the belief that heterosexual experiences are the norm, deeming other identities and experiences as deviant or invisible. Cisheteronormativity expands on this term and includes the belief that being cisgender, rather than having a fluid gender identity or being transgender, should be treated as the norm. Research also shows that cisheteronormativity frequently prioritizes people that are not only cisgender and heterosexual, but also white and able-bodied.

According to Gust A. Yep's review of LGBTQ+ communication studies research, heteronormativity has four different types of harmful impacts on LGBTQ+ people: external, internal, discursive, and institutional. Externalized violence takes form in physical assault most frequently, while internalized violence takes form in self-hatred and self-destructive thoughts. Additionally, discursive violence can include the use of words, gestures, tones, and images to treat and degrade other people's experiences. In correlation with cisheteronormativity, this takes form in microaggressions, positioning LGBTQ+ people in a lower status in social and sexual hierarchies compared to those who are cisgender and heterosexual. Finally, institutional violence takes form in the deeply ingrained social institutions. To heal from cisheteronormativity, research has said that those who experience the ongoing violence can understand, unpack, and demystify its invisible power, rather than coping by repressing the pain.

==== Transgender subjectivity and identities ====
Transgender subjectivity examines how politics impacts the wellbeing of transgender communities, whether through legislative or other forms of political action, or through everyday interactions with other people within the public sphere. Commonly discussed issue areas among scholars about transgender subjectivity are within the legal context and academic spaces, such as the rights for transgender people to adopt children, involvement in sports, and bodily autonomy ranging from surgeries and hormone usage to public restrooms. Transgender subjectivity research also investigates how transgender individuals exist in the world around them and how they are perceived within society. LGBTQ+ rhetoric scholars frequently explore the layers to transgender representation within media, and scholars also look at transgender subjectivity in online communication.

=== Intersectionality and LGBTQ+ communication studies foundations ===
Intersectionality was first theorized by Kimberlé Crenshaw in 1989 to examine how Black women faced oppression connected to their race and gender simultaneously. Since then, communication studies researchers have expanded intersectionality to theorize how people's identities interact like sexuality, gender, race, nationality, and religion, and to theorize how people face discrimination, marginalization, and violence due to these intersections. Communication studies has analyzed how LGBTQ+ people's intersecting identities affect their lives in different cultures and scenarios. Intersectionality research in communication studies focused on how, at any given time, the main social categories that separate people in a society, like race, class, gender, sexuality, disability, and age, are connected and cannot be separated; instead, they work together and build on each other and create experiences of injustice and privilege. LGBTQ+ intersectional research examples include intersections of race, religion, disability, and more.

==== LGBTQ+ intersectional feminist communication studies ====
Communication researchers theorize intersectionality and feminism by examining how people of all genders have multiple intersecting identities such as sexuality, race, gender, nationality, and religion. This can examine how women are discriminated against based on race, ethnicity, sexuality, gender identity, or disabilities. Scholars are also researching how queer theory can be adopted into organizational communication to allow a safer, more accepting environment for LGBTQ+ people in the work place. LGBTQ+ intersectional research examples include intersections of race, religion, disability, and more.

==== Queer and trans people of color (QTPOC) communication studies ====
Transgender people and people of color may face marginalization across their lives. Communication researchers study how queer and trans people of color (QTPOC) navigate how their intersecting identities and experiences of discrimination interact as they communicate in many contexts. Research finds that trans people of color often experience discrimination and emotional and physical violence due to the linkages of cisheteronormativity and racism. Due to safety needs and risks of violence, QTPOC need safer spaces and ways to gather together to celebrate life, like queer bars according to researchers. LGBTQ+ communication studies explores the intersection of these identities examining how people in different cultures and upbringings engage with queer people of color. Communication researchers have also been analyzing the queer-of-color critique that examines whiteness within the queer community.

==== Quare communication theory ====
Communication researchers have examined how different groups have theorized versions of intersectionality, and some communities have created terms that describe the intersectionality of their own group. For example, Quare individuals are Black gay men who face challenges in society that are unique to themselves and their Black, queer masculinity. The word Quare comes from an incorrect pronunciation of "Queer" spoken by communication and performance studies scholar E. Patrick Johnson's grandmother in North Carolina. Johnson took inspiration from his grandmother's perspectives of queer people, and he wrote about a new identity called "Quare," which is separate from his grandmother's definition. Further research on Quare theory has examined how Internet sites like YouTube also invite gay Black men to share their similar experiences coming out and receiving criticism, which helps to define what Quare means for them. The Quare community has made clear the importance of the distinction between Quare and Queer because their intersectional experiences have not offered the same privileges or experiences as white queer people.

==== Queer and religious communication intersections ====
LGBTQ+ communication studies research has investigated the complex relationships of being queer and religious as tied to conflicting beliefs, values, and interpretations of sexual identity. Scholars note that liminality is the in-between state of transitioning, and it can be used to describe the relationship that many queer people have with religion. With the risk of being disciplined or excluded for coming out, many gay Christians must create an identity that works for themself and their environment. Similar issues with finding identity are found with transgender people who go to church, as researchers found that trans people experience backlash at some churches if the congregation believes that transgender people are against the doctrine of the church. One example was a transgender male priest named Weekely where members of the United Methodist Church, the same denomination of Weekely, purposely misgendered Weekely in their letters.

==== Queer and crip communication intersections ====
Another intersectional LGBTQ+ area of communication research focuses on disabled queer and trans people, who also connect queer and crip theories. One study addressed a how LGBTQ+ disabled people engage in active online activism. The research concluded that online platforms are very important for these LGBTQ+ disability communities to build strong coalitions. These groups challenge traditional ideas of community and make political engagement possible in more places than just standard physical locations. Many LGBTQ+ individuals who are disabled reported to communication researchers that they do not have a voice in general society. A study found that when disabled LGBTQ+ people are given a chance to have a say, they are looked down upon by able-bodied people who see disability as a needing correction.

== Fields of LGBTQ+ communication studies today ==
Many fields in communication studies research and teach about LGBTQ+ communication. LGBTQ+ communication studies researches have examined sex, sexuality, and gender identity across interpersonal relationships, families, small groups, organizations, intercultural and international contexts, rhetoric and society, performance studies and narratives, and media studies.

== See also ==
- Communication studies
- Queer studies
- Transgender studies
