= Hasmukh Dawda =

Kenyan-Ugandan entrepreneur

- Born: 1950 (age 75–76); Ndere Village, Siaya County, Kenya
- Occupations: Businessman, industrialist, entrepreneur, philanthropist
- Years active: 1963 - present
- Title: Chairman; Dawda Group
- Spouse: Aruna Dawda
- Website: dgpropertiesltd.com

Hasmukh Dawda is a businessman, entrepreneur, industrialist and philanthropist in Uganda and Kenya.

== Background and education ==
He was born in 1950 to a family of modest means, with ten other siblings, in Ndere Village, Siaya County, Kenya. He attended Ndere Primary School, but dropped out of school at age 13 because of an inability to pay school fees.

== Career ==
Forced to drop out of school, he went into business for himself, beginning with hawking confectionery. An Indian shopkeeper offered him a job at Sh150 per month. He was able to save and raise about KSh2,000, by the age of 19. He put that money as a down-payment on a KSh5,000 pickup truck, paying the balance in installments. He also opened a retail shop in his home village of Ndere.

In 1970, he began processing molasses at rented premises, using equipment that he already owned. He began buying raw material directly from the farmers, with whom he had good relations. He also began trading in cotton and fresh fruit. Five years later, he built Uholo Factory, a jaggery (molasses factory) that runs to date. In 1985, he established Jambo Biscuits Limited, a confectionery maker, under the House of Dawda Group of Companies.

In the mid 1990s, he moved to Uganda and started Britannia Allied Industries Limited, a company that processes fresh fruit to make fruit juice, manufactures sauces and seasonings, bottles mineral water, and makes confectioneries. He has since established other companies in both Kenya and Uganda. In 2002, he used some of his assets in Uganda to buy House of Manji, a confectionery maker in Kenya that had failed. He pumped in money and revived the business.

== Other responsibilities ==
Dawda is a married man.

== See also ==
- Indian diaspora in East Africa
- List of African millionaires
- List of wealthiest people in Kenya
