= Hakima Abbas =

Political scientist

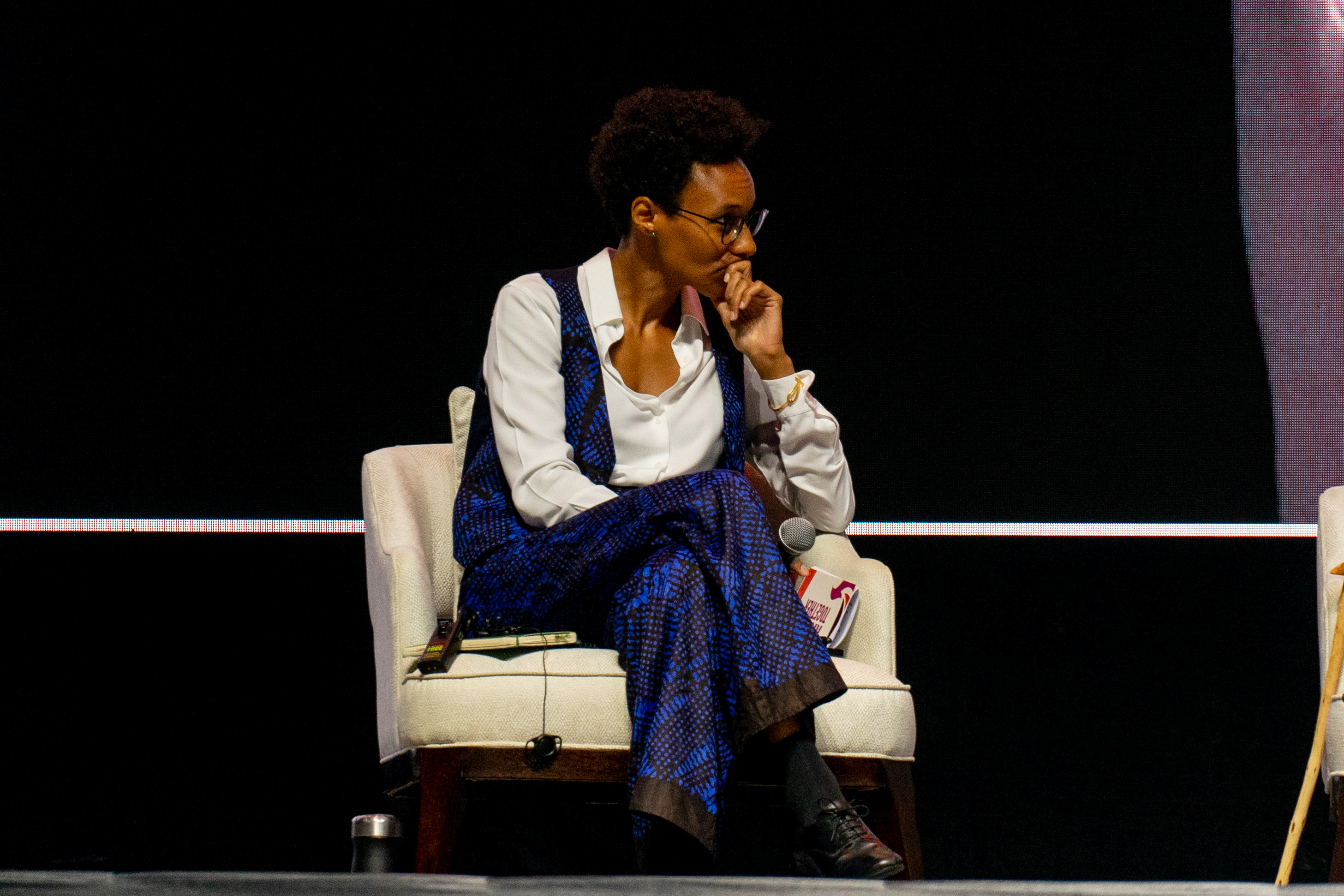
Hakima Abbas in Bangkok, Thailand at the opening panel of the AWID Forum in December 2024.

Hakima Abbas is a political scientist, feminist activist, writer, and researcher. In 2016, she became co-executive director of Association for Women's Rights in Development (AWID), an international feminist organization focused on promoting gender equality and women's rights globally.

Abbas has been an advocate for intersectional feminism and the importance of centering marginalized voices in global development and political discussions. She has emphasized the importance of collective action in achieving social justice goals.

In response to the COVID-19 pandemic, Abbas co-developed the "Just Recovery" plan, emphasizing the need to prioritize women and girls, who were disproportionately affected by the economic and social fallout of the pandemic.

In 2021, Abbas co-founded the Black Feminist Fund with Tynesha McHarris and Amina Doherty, a philanthropic initiative aimed at supporting Black feminist movements worldwide. The fund, supported by organizations like the Ford Foundation, aims to address the systemic underfunding of Black feminist initiatives globally.

== Leadership and Advocacy ==
=== Association for Women’s Rights in Development (AWID) ===
- In 2016, Hakima Abbas became the co-executive director of the Association for Women’s Rights in Development (AWID), a global feminist organization that works to advance gender equality and women’s rights worldwide.
- At AWID, she has championed intersectional feminism, emphasizing the importance of including marginalized voices, especially women and girls from the Global South, in development and policy-making processes.

=== Fahamu ===
- Before her tenure at AWID, Abbas served as the executive director of Fahamu, a pan-African organization focused on social justice and human rights.
- At Fahamu, she worked on fostering collaboration among African grassroots movements and strengthening advocacy efforts to advance equality and justice.

Previously, she served as the executive director of Fahamu, an organization dedicated to social justice in Africa.

== Major Contributions ==
=== Just Recovery Plan ===
- During the COVID-19 pandemic, Abbas co-authored the "Just Recovery" plan, which called for a feminist approach to economic recovery.
- This initiative emphasized prioritizing the rights and needs of women and girls who were disproportionately affected by the pandemic’s economic and social consequences.

=== Co-Founder of the Black Feminist Fund ===
- In 2021, she co-founded the Black Feminist Fund alongside Tynesha McHarris and Amina Doherty.
- The fund aims to address systemic funding inequities faced by Black feminist movements globally, with backing from organizations like the Ford Foundation

=== Contributions to Feminist Africa ===
- Abbas has contributed to issues of Feminist Africa, including the "Feminism and Pan-Africanism" issue, where she explored the intersections of feminist theory and pan-African political movements.

== Recognition and Impact ==
Abbas has also contributed to academic and activist discourse as the co-editor of the Queer African Reader (2013), alongside Sokari Ekine. The book is recognized as a critical contribution to feminist and LGBTQ+ scholarship in Africa.

- Feminist Africa, Issue 20: Feminism and Pan-Africanism. *Hakima Abbas; Sokari Ekine (2013). Queer African reader. Dakar, Senegal. ISBN 978-0-85749-099-5. OCLC 806013085. *Hakima Abbas (2007). Africa's long road to rights: reflections on the 20th anniversary of the African Commission on Human and Peoples' Rights = Long trajet de l'Afrique vers les droits : réflexions lors du 20ème anniversaire de la Commission Africaine des Droits de l'Homme et des Peuples. Nairobi: Fahamu. ISBN 978-1-906387-27-3. OCLC 759159865. *Abbas, Hakima (2009). Aid to Africa: redeemer or coloniser?. Pambazuka Press. ISBN 978-1-906387-48-8. OCLC 759159841.

- Interview by Deutsche Afrik Stiftung (de)

Profile on Association for Women's Rights in Development: AWID Website
