= Eric Holt Giménez =

Eric Holt Giménez is an agroecologist, political economist, lecturer and author. From 1975 to 2002 he worked in Mexico, Central America and South Africa in sustainable agricultural development. During this time he helped to start the Campesino a Campesino (Farmer to Farmer) Movement. He returned to the U.S. twice during this period: once for his M.Sc. in international agricultural development (UC Davis, 1981) and then for his Ph.D. in environmental studies (UC Santa Cruz, 2002). His dissertation research was the basis for his first book Campesino a Campesino: Voices from the farmer-to-farmer movement for sustainable agriculture in Latin America. After receiving his Ph.D. with an emphasis in agroecology and political economy, he taught as a university lecturer at UC Santa Cruz and Boston University in the International Honors Program in Global Ecology. He gives yearly courses of food systems transformation and social movements in Italy in the Masters program of the University of Gastronomic Sciences in Pollenzo (slow food) and in the doctoral program at the Universidad de Antioquia in Medellín, Colombia. His work has appeared in The New York Times, The Herald Tribune, Le Monde Diplomatique, La Jornada and The Des Moines Register. He has a blog on the Huffington Post.

In 2004–2006, he was the Latin America program co-ordinator for the Bank Information Center in Washington, D.C. His seminal work, Land-Gold-Reform: The Territorial Restructuring of the Guatemalan Highlands (published in English, Spanish and Portuguese), links the struggle against extractive industries with the struggle for land in Latin America and is a product of this experience. In June 2006, he was hired as the executive director of Food First (the Institute for Food and Development Policy), a people's think tank started by Frances Moore Lappé in 1975. He specializes in environmental studies, area studies, development studies, agroecology and the political economy of hunger. He works closely with social movements in the U.S. and internationally and asserts that, "Successful social movements are formed by integrating activism with livelihoods. These integrated movements create the deep sustained social pressure that produces political will—the key to changing the financial, governmental, and market structures that presently work against sustainability." Walden Bello is a particular advocate of the importance of Gimenez's work, referring to him as one of the world's most "prominent critics of the global food system".

== Publications ==
- Eric Holt-Gimenez and Annie Shattuck, "Food Crises, food regimes and food movements: rumblings of reform or tides of transformation?", The Journal of Peasant Studies. Vol. 38, No. 1, January 2011, 109–144. Reprinted as "Food Security, Food Justice, or Food Sovereignty? Crises, Food Movements, and Regime Change", in Alison Hope Alkon and Julian Agyeman, (eds.), Cultivating Food Justice: Race, Class, and Sustainability, Cambridge: MIT Press,(2011), pp. 309–30.
- Eric Holt-Giménez Guest Editor; Roland Bunch; Jorge Irán Vasquez; John Wilson; Michel P. Pimbert; Bary Boukary; Cathleen Kneen, "Linking farmers' movements for advocacy and practice", The Journal of Peasant Studies. Vol. 37, No. 1, January 2010, 203–236
- With Raj Patel, Food Rebellions! Crisis and the hunger for justice, Food First/Grassroots international/Fahamu Books, (2009)
- Territorial Restructuring and the Grounding of Agrarian Reform: Indigenous Communities, Gold Mining and the World Bank, Transnational Institute and 11.11.11, Series editors: Jun Borras, Jennifer Franco, Sofia Monsalve and Armin Paasch (2009)
- Campesino a Campesino: Voices from the farmer-to-farmer movement for sustainable agriculture in Latin America, 300 pp., Food First, Oakland (2006).
- Holt-Giménez, Eric. A Foodie's Guide to Capitalism: Understanding the Political Economy of What We Eat. Monthly Review Press, 2017.

== Other media ==
- Changing Course, an 18-minute video-documentary on the participatory research study: "Measuring Farmers’ Agroecological resistance to Hurricane Mitch in Central America", World Neighbors/Note Bene Productions, New York, 1999 (English and Spanish)
- Campesino a Campesino, 30 minute video-documentary on the farmer to farmer, peasant movement for sustainable agriculture, Alba Films, c.Union Nacional de Agricultores y Ganaderos, Managua, Nicaragua, 1991 (Spanish)
- Families Beyond the Fence, 1-hour video-documentary on the economic and ecological difficulties facing Mexican peasant families, Pearson-Glaser Productions, 1980

== Articles ==
- "From peasant to peasant", ILEIA Newsletter, 8 nº 2, July 1992
- "From Food Crisis to Food Sovereignty: The Challenge of Social Movements", Monthly Review, July/August, 2009
- Biofuels: "The Five Myths of the Agro-fuels Transition"
- "FAO’s Food Crisis Summit versus the People’s State of Emergency"
- "The Biofuels Myth", New York Times, July 10, 2007
- "New Green Revolution and world food prices" (with Raj Patel)
- "Fair to the Last Drop: The Corporate Challenges to Fair Trade Coffee", Food First Development Report No 17, November 2007
- "LAND – GOLD – REFORM The Territorial Restructuring of Guatemala's Highlands", Food First Development Report No 16, September 2007 (also in Portuguese and Spanish in Brazil and Peru)
- "Campesino a Campesino: Voices from the farmer-to-farmer movement for sustainable agriculture in Latin America", 300 pp., Food First, Oakland (2006).
- "Measuring farmers' agroecological resistance after Hurricane Mitch in Nicaragua: a case study in participatory, sustainable land management impact monitoring". Agriculture, Ecosystems & Environment 93: 87–105, Amsterdam, (2002).
- "Measuring farmers’ agroecological resistance to Hurricane Mitch in Central America: Participatory action research for sustainable agricultural development", Gatekeeper Series, International Institute for Environment and Development, London (2002).
