= Firoze Manji =

Kenyan activist (born 1950)

Firoze Madatally Manji
- Born: 1950 (age 75–76); Kenya
- Education: University of Newcastle upon Tyne; London Hospital Medical College; University of London
- Known for: Editor, publisher and activism
- Title: Professor
- Website: darajapress.com/authors/firoze-manji

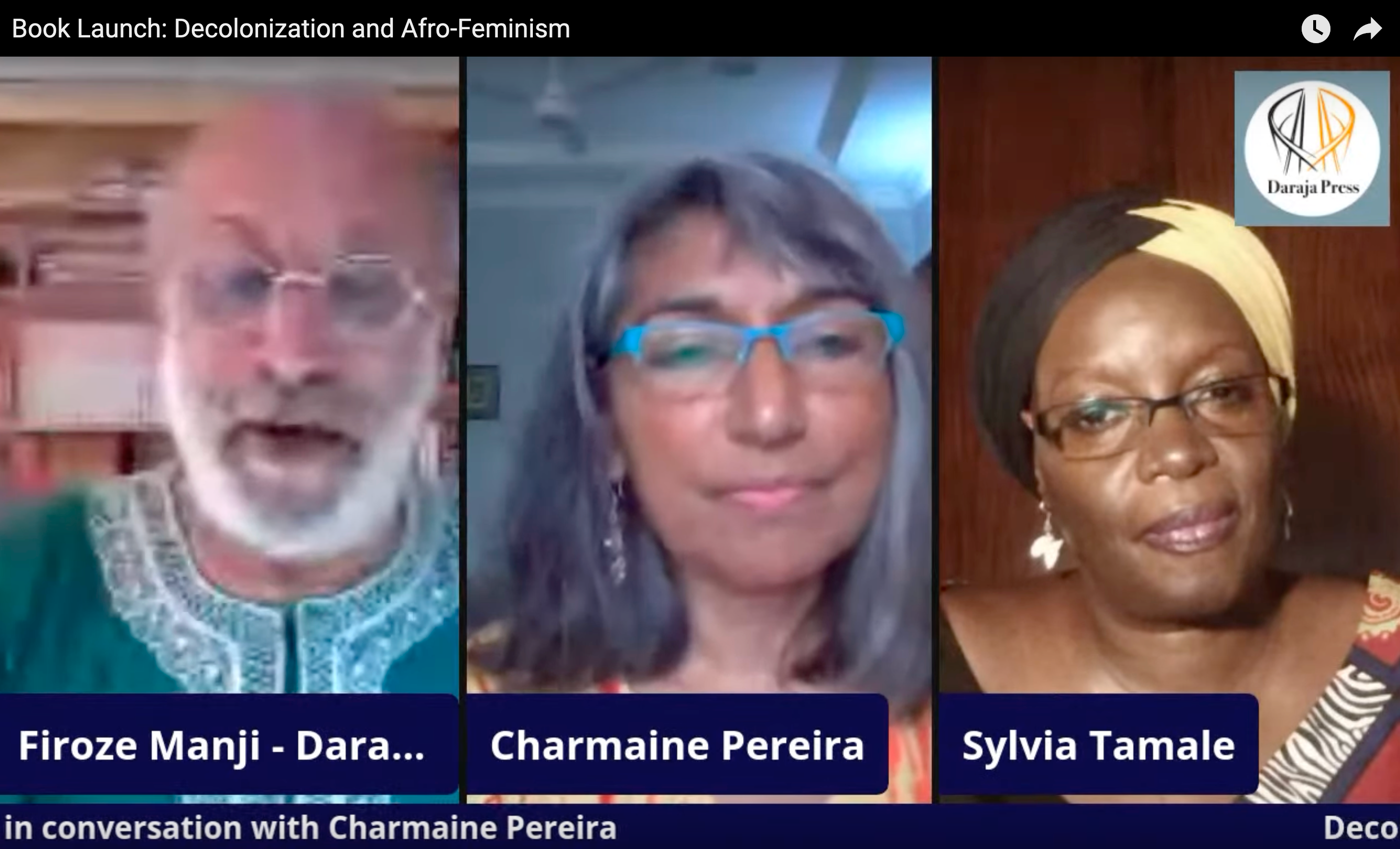
Manji in conversation with Charmaine Pereira and Sylvia Tamale

Firoze Madatally Manji (born 1950) is a Kenyan activist. He is the recipient of the 2021 Nicolás Cristóbal Guillén Batista Lifetime Achievement Award from the Caribbean Philosophical Association.

== Background ==
Firoze Manji was born in Kenya, to Kenya's "Biscuit Baron" Madatally Manji and his wife Fatima. After obtaining a dentistry degree from the University of Newcastle upon Tyne, he started his career as a dentist working as a prison dentist and part-time as an immigration advisor at the Hammersmith Law Centre, London. He obtained an MSc degree in Dental Public Health from the London Hospital Medical College, University of London; and a PhD from the Faculty of Medicine at the University of London.

== Career ==
Firoze Manji is the publisher of Daraja Press and presenter of the podcast series Organising in the time of COVID-19. He is also the founder and former editor-in-chief of the pan-African social justice newsletter and website Pambazuka News and Pambazuka Press. He is the founder and former executive director of Fahamu - Networks for Social Justice. He has published widely on health, social policy, human rights and political sciences, and authored and edited a range of books on social justice in Africa, including on women's rights, trade justice, on China's role in Africa, and on the uprisings in Africa. He is co-editor, with Sokari Ekine, of African Awakenings: The Emerging Revolutions and co-editor with Bill Fletcher Jr, of Claim No Easy Victories: The Legacy of Amilcar Cabral. He has authored chapters in several books, including "Culture, Power and Resistance: Reflections on the ideas of Amilcar Cabral" in the State of Power 2017 published by the Transnational Institute; and "Emancipation, freedom or taxonomy? What does it mean to be African?" in Racism After Apartheid (Wits University Press), 2019.

Manji has previously worked as director of Pan-African Baraza for Thoughtworks, as Africa program director for Amnesty International, Chief Executive of the Aga Khan Foundation (UK), and Regional Representative for Health Sciences in Eastern and Southern Africa for the Canadian International Development Research Centre (IDRC), researcher at the Kenya Medical Research Institute, and lecturer in the Faculty of Medicine in Dental Public Health, University of Nairobi. He was managing director of TWIN / TWIN Trading 1997–1997. He served as a member of the Permanent Peoples' Tribunal on the Role of TNCs in Southern Africa (2018-9).

== Fellow/membership ==
Firoze Manji is adjunct professor in the Institute for African Studies, Carleton University, Ottawa, Canada, Associate Fellow of the Institute for Policy Studies, Senior Researcher at the Global Centre for Advanced Studies and Richard von Weizsäcker Fellow at the Robert Bosch Academy, Berlin.

Manji is a former board member of the Institute for Agriculture and Trade Policy and a former member of the board of Greenpeace Africa. He is a member of the editorial review board of Global Critical Caribbean Thought. He is a member of the editorial board of Nokoko, Journal of the Institute of African Studies, Carleton University, Ottawa, Ontario, and a member of the international advisory board of the journal Philosophy and Global Affairs. He is a member of the editorial board of AwaaZ Magazine. He was Visiting Fellow, Kellogg College, University of Oxford, 2001–2016.

== Books ==
- African Awakenings, The Emerging Revolutions, 2011
- China's New Role in Africa and the South: A Search for a New Perspective, 2008
- From the Slave Trade to "Free" Trade: How Trade Undermines Democracy and Justice in Africa (with Patrick Burnett)
- Manji F and Bill Fletcher Jr (2013): Claim No Easy Victories: The Legacy of Amilcar Cabral. Dakar: CODESRIA
- Manji F & Sokari Ekine (eds) (2012): African Awakening: The Emerging Revolutions. Oxford: Pambazuka Press.
- D Bronson, G Jones, M Kane, J B Karumbidza, A Maina, Manji F, M Mayet, P Mooney, O Ong’wen, S Ribeiro, K Sharife, J Thomas, K J Wetter (2011): New technologies and the threat to sovereignty in Africa. Oxford: Pambazuka Press.
- D G Guerrero, Manji F (eds) (2008): China's New Role in Africa and the South: A search for a new perspective. Oxford: Fahamu Books / Bangkok, Focus on the Global South.
- Manji F & S Marks (eds) (2007): African Perspectives on China in Africa. Oxford: Fahamu Books.
- Manji F & S Marks (eds) (2007): China en África: ¿Ayuda o arrasa? Barcelona: Oozebap
- P Burnett, Manji F (eds) (2007): From the Slave Trade to 'Free' Trade: How trade undermines democracy and justice in Africa. Oxford: Fahamu Books.
- Manji F, F J Mohammed, R Musa (eds) (2006): Breathing Life into the African Union Protocol on Women's Rights in Africa. Oxford: Fahamu Books
- Manji F, F J Mohammed, R Musa (eds) (2006): Vulgarisation du Protocole de L'Union Africaine sur les Droits des Femmes. Oxford: Fahamu Books
- P. Burnett, Manji F (eds) (2005) African Voices on Development and Social Justice: Editorials from Pambazuka News 2004. Oxford: Fahamu Books / Mkuki na Nyota, Dar es Salaam
- Fejerskov, Manji F, Baelum V, Moller IJ (1989): Fluorose Dentaria: Um Manual Para Profissionais da Saude. São Paulo: Livraria Editora Santos.
- Fejerskov, Manji F, Baelum V, Moller IJ (1988): Dental Fluorosis: A Handbook for Health Workers. Copenhagen: Munksgaard.
- Tiromwe F, Ekoku Y, Manji F, Baelum V, Fejerskov O: Oral Health in Uganda: a national survey. Kampala: Ministry of Health Uganda / Kenya Medical Research Institute.
- A Barker, Manji F (2000): Writing for Change: An Interactive Guide to Effective Writing, Writing for Science, and Writing for Advocacy. IDRC/ Fahamu.
- Manji F (2000): Proposals that Make a Difference. Oxford: Fahamu.

== Chapters in books ==
- Manji F (2019) (2019): "Emancipation, Freedom or Taxonomy? What Does It Mean to be African?" In Vishwas Satgar (ed): Racism After Apartheid: Challenges for Marxism and Anti-racism. Wits University Press. 4Manji F
- Manji F (2017): "Culture, power and resistance: Reflections on the ideas of Amilcar Cabral". In State of Power 2017. Amsterdam: Transnational Institute. https://www.tni.org/en/publication/state-of-pow
- Manji F (2017): "Las ideas anticolonialistas revolucionarias de Amilcar Cabral". Comites de Solidaridad con el Africa Negra.
- Manji F (2016): "Before we were Africans we were humans: What does it mean to be African". In University and Society within the Context of Arab Revolutions and New Humanism. Tunis: Rosa Luxemburg Foundation.
- Manji F (2016): "African awakenings and silences of the media". In Afrika: Radikal neu denken? Frankfurt am Main: Peter Lang GMBH.
- Manji F (2016): "Neoliberalism", in Beautiful Rising, https://beautifulrising.org/tool/neolibManji F
- Manji F (2012): "Africa Awakenings: the courage to invent the future". In: J Enloe et al. (eds), (Dis) Enabling the Public Sphere (Volume 2) Dakar, TrusManji F
- Manji F (2012): "Use of ICT and its Potential for Political Change in Africa". In: O Akinduro et al. (eds): Pressing Buttons for Political Change: Technology for Efficient Elections and Democracy Deepening and Broad.
- Manji F, Free A, Mark C (2012), "New media in Africa: Tools for liberation or means of subjugation". In S Srinivasan and A Alexander (eds), New Media, Alternative Politics. Working Papers 2. Cambridge: Centre for Governance and Human Rights, University of Cambridge.
- Van Grassdorff, E., RösManji, F en Manji, F. (20.03.2012). "Germany's genocide in Namibia. Unbearable silence, or How not to deal with your colonial past". AfricAvenir International [20.Manji F]
- Manji F (2012): "African Awakening: The courage to invent the future". In: Manji F & Sokari Ekine (eds) (2012), African Awakening: The Emerging Revolutions. Oxford, PambazukManji F.
- Manji F (2009): "Obama: the potentials of agency and potency". In: J Powell (ed.), Obama Reflections From Election Day to Presidency: Social Justice Thought Leaders Speak Out. Ohio, Kirwan Institute for the Study of Race and EManji Fy
- Manji F (2008): "Marking the 20th Anniversary of the African Commission". In: Hakima Abbas (ed.), Africa's Long Road to Rights/Long Trajet de l'Afrique vers les Droits: Reflections on the 20th Anniversary of the African Commission on Human and Peoples' Rights. Oxford: FahaManji Fs
- Manji F (2008): "The depoliticisation of poverty". In: Rasna Warah (2008), Missionaries, Mercenaries and Misfits: An Anthology. London: AutManji Fe
- Manji F (2008): "How we wish you were here: A tribute to Mwalimu Nyerere". In: Chambi Chachage, Annar Cassam (2010), Africa's Liberation: The Legacy of Nyerere. Oxford, PambazuManji Fs
- Manji F (2007): "Foreword". In: Issa G. Shivji (2007), Silences in NGO Discourse: The role and future of NGOs in Africa. Oxford: FahaManji Fs
- Manji F (2007): "Introduction". In: Manji Ftt & Manji F (eds) (2007), From the Slave Trade to 'Free' Trade: How trade undermines democracy and justice in Africa. Oxford: FahamManji F.
- Manji F (2007): "Publishing through ICTs for social justice in Africa". In: A Mlambo (ed.), African Scholarly Publishing. African Books Collective, Oxford / Dag Hammarskjold Foundation, Manji Fa
- Manji F (2000): "La despolitización de la pobreza". In: Eade D, Desarrollo y derechos humanos, ppManji F4
- Manji F (2000), "Social Policy and Rights in Africa: From Social Contract to Loss of Self-determination". In: Cook S and Kabeer N (eds), Social Policy in the South: Revisioning the Agenda, IDS Bulletin vol. 31, no. 4, October, pManji F0
- Manji F, Fejerskov O (1994): "An epidemiological approach to dental caries". In: Thylstrup A & Fejerskov O, Textbook of Clinical Cariology (2nd Edition), Copenhagen: Munksgaard, pp. 159–191.
- Baelum V, Manji F, Fejerskov O (1991): "The distribution of periodontal destruction in the populations of non-industrialized countries: evidence for the existence of high risk groups and individuals". In: Johnson, NW (ed.), Risk Markers for Oral Diseases v3: Periodontal diseases: markers for disease susceptibility and activity. 27–75. Cambridge: Cambridge University Press.
- Manji, F; Fejerskov, Ole; Bælum, Vibeke; Luan, W M; Chen, Xia. "The epidemiological features of dental caries in African and Chinese populations: Implications for risk assessment". In: Johnson, NW (ed.), Dental Caries: Markers of High and Low Risk Groups and Individuals. Vol. 1 Cambridge: Cambridge University Press, 1991, p. 62–99.
- Fejerskov O, Manji F (1990): "Risk assessment in dental caries". In: Bader JD (ed.), Risk Assessment in Dentistry. Chapel Hill, University of North Carolina Dental Ecology, 214–217.
- Fejerskov O, Manji F (1990): "Reactor paper: risk assessment in dental caries". In: Bader JD (ed.), Risk assessment in Dentistry. Chapel Hill: University of North Carolina Dental Ecology, 1990: 215–17.
- Manji F, Fejerskov O, Baelum V, Nagelkerke N (1989): "Dental calculus and caries experience in 15-65-year-olds with no access to dental care". In: Ten Cate JM: Recent Advances in the Study of Dental Calculus. Oxford: IRL Press at Oxford University Press, pp. 223–233.
- Nair KR, Manji F, Gitonga JN (1984): "The Occurrence and Distribution of Fluoride in Ground Waters in Kenya". Proceedings of the Harare Symposium IAHS. 144, 75–85, 1984.
