= Prishani Naidoo =

South African sociologist and activist (1973–2024)

Dr Prishani Naidoo
- Born: November 1, 1973; Durban, South Africa
- Died: December 23, 2024 (aged 51)

Academic background
- Education: University of the Witwatersrand (BA, BA Hons); University of KwaZulu-Natal (MA, PhD)
- Thesis: The Making of "the Poor" in Post-Apartheid South Africa: A Case Study of the City of Johannesburg and Orange Farm (2010)

Academic work
- Discipline: Sociology
- Sub-discipline: Political sociology; social movement studies
- Institutions: University of the Witwatersrand
- Main interests: Political subjectivity; social movements; labour; poverty; neoliberalism; higher education
- Notable works: New South African Review (co-editor) "Mapping movement landscapes in South Africa"

Prishani Naidoo (1 November 1973 – 23 December 2024) was a South African sociologist, writer and activist. She was director of the Society, Work and Politics Institute (SWOP) and a lecturer, later senior lecturer, in the Department of Sociology at the University of the Witwatersrand (Wits), Johannesburg. Her work focused on social movements, political subjectivity, labour, poverty and higher education in post-apartheid South Africa, and she had a long history of involvement in student, community and anti-privatisation struggles.

Naidoo co-edited several volumes of the New South African Review and co-authored essays on new social movements and the "movement landscapes" of popular protest.

== Early life and education ==
Naidoo was born in Durban on 1 November 1973, and shortly afterwards her family moved to Port Shepstone on the KwaZulu-Natal south coast, where she spent her early childhood. She attended a state-aided Indian school in Port Shepstone before returning to Durban in the mid-1980s to complete her schooling at an all-girls Catholic school.

She grew up in a politically engaged family: both parents were medical doctors, and her father, Dillie Naidoo, was involved in the revival of the Natal Indian Congress and had close ties to Black Consciousness activists. Naidoo later recalled that conversations about politics, apartheid and resistance were part of everyday life in the household.

After matric, Naidoo studied for a year at the University of Durban-Westville (later part of the University of KwaZulu-Natal), where she became involved in student politics through the South African National Students’ Congress (SANSCO). She then moved to Johannesburg to study at the University of the Witwatersrand, initially enrolling in medicine but later switching to a Bachelor of Arts degree, majoring in English and sociology. She completed her BA in 1997 and a BA (Honours) in comparative literature in 1998.

In the mid-2000s Naidoo undertook postgraduate study in development studies at the Centre for Civil Society at the University of KwaZulu-Natal. Her master's research was upgraded to a PhD, awarded in 2010, with a thesis titled The Making of "the Poor" in Post-Apartheid South Africa: A Case Study of the City of Johannesburg and Orange Farm.

== Activism and civil society work ==
Naidoo's political activism began in late apartheid, when she joined local African National Congress and ANC Youth League structures during her school years in Durban. At Wits she became a prominent student leader, participating in debates over the future of higher education and student governance in the early 1990s. She held leadership positions in the South African Students’ Congress (SASCO) Wits branch from 1992 to 1997, served as vice-president of the Wits Students’ Representative Council in 1995 and was twice president of the South African University Students’ Representative Council (SAU-SRC).

After her undergraduate studies, Naidoo worked in civil society organisations. From 1997 to 1999 she was involved in gender education work at Khanya College, facilitating programmes with trade union members from unions such as the South African Commercial, Catering and Allied Workers’ Union (SACCAWU), the National Education, Health and Allied Workers’ Union (NEHAWU), the Police and Prisons Civil Rights Union (POPCRU) and the South African Municipal Workers’ Union (SAMWU). She then served as gender programme officer at the Heinrich Böll Foundation’s Southern Africa office, developing a regional gender programme.

In 2001 Naidoo co-founded the Research and Education in Development (RED) collective with Ahmed Veriava and others. The collective undertook research and educational work for non-governmental organisations and social movements, including in communities affected by water and electricity privatisation. During this period Naidoo became closely involved with the Anti-Privatisation Forum (APF), a coalition opposing the commodification of basic services in Johannesburg and surrounding areas, and worked with organisations in Orange Farm and other townships.

Naidoo’s activism extended to struggles around labour, land and access to higher education. She participated in and reflected on student and worker mobilisations, including the #FeesMustFall protests, and was involved in projects aimed at “re-membering” movement histories and practices.

== Academic career ==
Naidoo joined the Department of Sociology at the University of the Witwatersrand as a lecturer in 2008, initially working within SWOP's Land, Labour and Life research programme. She was later promoted to senior lecturer in sociology and, in 2019, was appointed director of SWOP. Under her leadership the institute developed programmes on popular politics, a just transition from coal and rethinking research methodologies, including a project on “re-membering movements” that drew on her long engagement with social movements and activism.

Beyond Wits, Naidoo served on the advisory board of the Centre for Applied Legal Studies (CALS) from 2023, contributing her experience in social movement research and activism to the organisation's work on social and economic rights. She also took part in international intellectual exchanges and visiting teaching, including a residency with the Mexican art and research space SOMA, where she engaged with questions of collective memory and political imagination.

== Research and writing ==
Naidoo's research centred on political subjectivity, social movements, labour and precarity, poverty, neoliberal restructuring and the politics of higher education in South Africa. Her doctoral thesis examined how “the poor” are constructed in municipal policy and practice in post-apartheid Johannesburg, focusing on indigent households and service delivery in Orange Farm.

She co-authored analyses of new social movements and the Anti-Privatisation Forum with Dale T. McKinley, arguing that these movements represented new forms of grassroots organisation emerging in response to neoliberal reforms. Her later work, often co-written with Karl von Holdt and Ahmed Veriava, explored “movement landscapes” – overlapping terrains of organisation, protest and everyday practices – and the ways in which race, class and other forms of difference are articulated in contemporary struggles.

In Mapping movement landscapes in South Africa (2019), co-authored with von Holdt, Naidoo analysed patterns of protest and organisation across sectors and regions, suggesting that attention to these shifting landscapes can challenge simple narratives about a “rebellion of the poor” or a single social movement wave. Her work has been cited in debates on precarious work, trade unions and community struggles in South Africa.

Naidoo also wrote on race, culture and political thought. With Ahmed Veriava she co-authored “Articulating difference: reading Biko-with-Hall”, which brings the work of Steve Biko into conversation with cultural theorist Stuart Hall in order to think about difference and solidarity in South African struggles.

Her reflections on student politics and leadership were included in Reflections of South African Student Leaders 1994 to 2017, where she discussed her experiences in SASCO and the Wits SRC and the changing terrain of university governance and protest. Colleagues and reviewers have argued that, through her scholarly and editorial work on the New South African Review series, Naidoo helped shape critical debates on South African politics, inequality and democracy two decades after apartheid.

== Death and legacy ==
Naidoo died on 23 December 2024, aged 51. Obituaries and tributes from colleagues, students and activists described her as a radical and principled intellectual whose work bridged academic research and grassroots struggle, and emphasised her role as a mentor and collaborator.

SWOP, Wits University and allied organisations held memorial events in early 2025, including a public memorial service at Wits Great Hall under the title “Re-membering Prishani Naidoo”.
