= Food First =

American nonprofit organization

Food First / Institute for Food and Development Policy
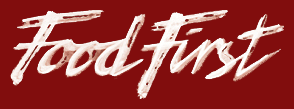
- Founded: 1975
- Founder: Frances Moore Lappé and Joseph Collins
- Type: Think tank
- Purpose: Food Sovereignty, Sustainable Agriculture, Human Rights
- Location: Oakland, California, United States
- Region served: Global
- Key people: Frances Moore Lappé, co-founder, Eric Holt-Gimenez, Executive Director Emeritus
- Award: Right Livelihood Award
- Website: foodfirst.org

Food First, also known as the Institute for Food and Development Policy, is a nonprofit organization based in Oakland, California, US. Founded in 1975 by Frances Moore Lappé and Joseph Collins, it describes itself as a "people's think tank and education-for-action center".

Its mission is "to eliminate the injustices that cause hunger". According to the Food First website, its main goal is to forge food sovereignty for human rights and sustainable livelihoods, and to do so it has three programs of development: building local agri-foods systems, farmers forming food sovereignty, and democratizing development. The organization is meant to offer policy analysis on poverty, agriculture, and development, and is highly critical of the policies implemented by the World Bank and the International Monetary Fund. The organization focuses on the Green Revolution which was supported in the 1970s and which did not produce the development people hoped for. Instead it put in place a system that has high input-costs, but does not produce a yield much higher than traditional farming methods. There has been a recent resurgence of Green Revolution ideas, especially with the large-scale support of genetically modified organisms (GMOs) and high-yield-variety agriculture. Food First claims that these policies will only further global inequalities, and has produced several policy briefs stating that the way to establish fair and effective development is through local sustainable agriculture.

In 1987, the organization received the Right Livelihood Award "for revealing the political and economic causes of world hunger and how citizens can help to remedy them."

== History and organizational structure ==
The organization began in 1975 as the Institute for Food and Development Policy (IFDP). The institute was founded by Frances Moore Lappé and Joseph Collins, and actually began in New York in Lappe's basement before relocating to San Francisco, and then later to Oakland where it is still located. In 1977 the IFDP published its first work, Food First: Beyond the Myth of Scarcity, and has since continued publishing policy briefs and analysis on the world food system and the inequalities that are caused by it. Today's Food First is managed by a board of trustees that has five members with backgrounds in different non-profit organizations. They have a shared vision of creating a more grass-roots based system of economic development through the endorsement of local and sustainable agriculture systems. The organization's president is Joyce E. King, whose work in sociology has focused on "women's participation in grass roots social change movements in Africa, South America and France". In addition to the board of trustees, Food First has six staff members who work on the organization's policy briefs. The staff's executive director is Eric Holt-Gimenez, who has published several books on global inequalities and the global food system, including Food Rebellions! Crisis and the Hunger for Justice, which outlines seven steps to solving the world food crisis. Finally, the organization benefits from the support of the general public through interns and volunteers who contribute to the process of policy research. Food First is a think-tank composed of many individuals from many different backgrounds, who share the organization's aim of eliminating global inequalities through the rethinking of the world's emphasis on industry-based economics, and shifting the paradigm towards a more inclusive form of economic development.

== Programs and guiding philosophy ==
The organization has three programs that it implements in order to achieve this aim:

1. Tackling class and racial inequalities in the agri-foods industry. There is a form of structural racism in the United States, as one study found "there were 30% fewer supermarkets in low-income areas than in higher-income areas, and these low-income areas had 55% less grocery store square footage than their wealthier income counterparts. The study also found that the levels of unmet food demand in these communities were as high as 70%". Without an accessible availability of cheap, healthy foods, low-income communities show high levels of diabetes and heart problems. Food First attempts to counter this structural racism by providing information and analysis, helping spread awareness and debate, and by helping create a national coalition of urban communities of color for food security. By studying international economic development and U.S. inequalities and development, Food First is taking a holistic approach that aims to change the way that we view the relationship between access to food and economic development.
2. Helping farmers form food sovereignty by creating projects such as The Campesino in Mexico and Central America, and by working with Via Campesina. These groups focus on farmer alternatives to the corporate agrifoods industry, helping farmers educate each other on strategies for alternatives. Food First's strategy emphasizes the farmer's sovereignty and acknowledges their self-determination. They believe a main flaw of the Green Revolution of the past and of the new Green Revolution is that the transnational institutions that implemented it failed to consult the people that would be affected by it the most, small farmers. Placing power and sovereignty in the hands of the disenfranchised is crucial for development.
3. Empowering farmers by giving them a voice. This program focuses on the structural causes of hunger and poverty, supporting advocacy groups that are against the agrifoods industry and are in support of consumer-led alternatives that allow for "justice, equity and ecological sustainability". Food First helps through projects such as No Full Tanks with Empty Bellies: The Food and Fuel Sovereignty Campaign. This project aims to inform the public about the negative impacts caused by bio-fuels. The spread of advocacy is Food First's key role, providing information that is essential for awareness, debate, and change. Lack of food sovereignty, poverty, and hunger, are all interrelated structural problems that take a collective effort to change; Food First aims to bring this collective together to spark this change.

Food First believes that world hunger is not an inevitable phenomenon that occurs simply because there is not enough food produced worldwide. Instead, it argues that there is an enormous surplus of food produced by corporate agri-businesses based in wealthy developed nations, and this enormous surplus of food is a reflection on broader global inequalities that deeply impact and harm marginalized third-world countries worldwide. While challenging the idea that world hunger exists because there is simply not enough food produced or available, Holz-Gimenez and Patel explain that, "...according to the FAO, with record grain harvests in 2007, there was more than enough food in the world to feed everyone—at least 1.5 times current demand". Food First argues that world hunger is not caused by food production shortages, and in fact points the blame to systemic causes such as speculation on the market, investments in large-scale GMO farms that have higher input-costs, and the bio-fuels market. By illustrating these ideas, Food First tries to bring to the table a new approach to global hunger that they believe has been largely ignored.

Food First supports a "bottom-up" approach to solving world hunger, asserting the ability of all countries to feed their own people if they focus on agriculture for subsistence rather than for export.

Food First strongly opposes the policies of what they deem to be free market institutions such as the World Trade Organization, World Bank, and International Monetary Fund. As of 2004, it is active in the campaign against the proposed Free Trade Area of the Americas.

== See also ==
- Walden Bello
- Eric Holt Giménez
- Pat Mooney
- Right Livelihood Award
- Food security
