= Joia Jefferson Nuri =

- Born: March 10, 1953 (age 73); Cleveland, Ohio
- Citizenship: American
- Education: American University in Washington, D.C.
- Occupations: Leadership and public speaking coach, podcast host

Joia Jefferson Nuri is an executive leadership and public speaking coach, podcast host, and founder of In the Public Eye Communications, a leadership consulting firm. Nuri was one of the first five women technicians hired by NBC News and the first Black woman to serve as technical director of the CBS Evening News and Face the Nation.

== Early life and education ==
Born as Joia Elizabeth Jefferson on March 10, 1953, in Cleveland, Ohio, to George Bennett Jefferson and Lucile Helen Cooley Jefferson, Nuri is the eldest of two daughters, with two half-siblings from her father’s previous marriage.

Her family relocated to Baltimore when she was 12, where she attended Northwestern High School. Nuri later enrolled at American University in Washington, D.C. Her career in communications began during her sophomore year when she took a television production course, leading to a job at NBC News after an assignment involving news anchor Jim Vance.

== Career ==
=== Television and Radio ===
Nuri began her broadcasting career in 1974 at NBC News Washington as a studio camera operator and videotape editor. She worked during pivotal moments in U.S. history, such as the Watergate hearings, alongside legendary journalists Tom Brokaw, John Chancellor, and David Brinkley. In 1976, her work with NBC's WRC-TV received an Emmy Award for news coverage.

In 1979, Nuri joined CBS News Washington, where she became the first Black woman Technical Director for CBS Evening News and Face the Nation. She later transitioned to Black Entertainment Television (BET) as the second hire in their news department. At BET, she launched the network’s first news program, produced a news talk show, and created a documentary on AIDS in the Black community.

Throughout the 1980s and 1990s, Nuri worked as a freelance reporter and producer for different outlets, including international coverage of emerging democracies in West Africa. At PBS station WHMM (now WHUT), she produced the award-winning Evening Exchange program hosted by Kojo Nnamdi. She also held senior producer roles at NPR’s WAMU-FM and C-SPAN, where she booked political figures for the flagship program Washington Journal.

=== Communications Strategist ===
In 2001, Nuri founded her communications strategy firm, In the Public Eye Communications, to support human rights leaders in gaining media visibility. Her clients included the activist work of Harry Belafonte and Danny Glover, the Institute for Policy Studies, TransAfrica, and Truly Living Well Center for Natural Urban Agriculture. Her work involved crafting messages for Congressional testimony, media appearances, and keynote speeches, helping amplify civil rights and social justice voices.

=== Executive Leadership and Public Speaking Coach ===
In 2013, Nuri shifted her focus to public speaking coaching, an interest she developed during her communications work. She has since coached and co-written 14 TEDx Talks, including delivering her own in 2017 titled A Reimagined Fourth Estate. Her coaching emphasizes message clarity, audience engagement, and authenticity.

In 2018, she expanded her focus to executive leadership coaching by starting In The Public Eye Coaching. In 2021, she received a leadership coaching certificate from Mentor Coach, accredited by the International Coaching Federation (ICF). Her practice primarily serves women of color in senior leadership roles across corporations, government, and foundations.

=== Other professional activities ===
Nuri has contributed as a guest lecturer on public speaking at Georgetown University’s Beck Center for Social Impact & Innovation and Democracy Summer, a political education initiative by Congressman Jamie Raskin. for college students

She has delivered keynote speeches at events, including the Organization for Security & Cooperation in Europe (OSCE) meeting in Vienna in 2012. Her writing portfolio includes drafting Congressional testimony on food security and foreign aid and blogging about women in leadership. In May 2023, she launched the podcast Unshackled Leadership: A Lantern for Black Women, focusing on leadership insights for Black women professionals. In March 2024, she became a contributor to an online radio show entitled The Price of Business and has been writing commentaries for The Daily Telegraph USA since 2024.

== Personal life ==
Nuri married K. Rashid Nuri in 1998 and was later divorced. Since infancy, she has served as a legal guardian for her niece, India Tisdale, and maintains a close bond with her older sister, Jacquetta Burrows. Her role now includes being grandmother to their children.

== Awards and honors ==
- Emmy Award, WRC-TV, 1976
- PBS Programming Excellence Award, 1992
- PBS Spirit Award, Pacifica Radio Network, 2012
