= House of Dawda Group =

Ugandan conglomerate

- Founded: 1962
- Headquarters: Kampala, Uganda
- Key people: Hasmukh Dawda chairman
- Products: fruit juices, sauces, mineral water, confectionery, warehousing, apartment complexes
- Revenue: US$ 380 million (2023)
- Operating income: ▼US$10 million (2023)
- Net income: ▲US$18 Million (2023)
- Total assets: US$ 420 million (2023)
- Number of employees: 7,000+ (2022)

The House of Dawda Group is a privately owned conglomerate in Uganda.

== History ==
The group traces its beginnings to 1962, when its founder chairman, Hasmukh Dawda, began a trading business in neighboring Kenya. Having dropped out of school at age 13, he first began trading in confectioneries, before he eventually raised enough capital to start manufacturing his own.

In 1991, the group set up the Britania biscuit manufacturing in Kampala. In 1996, the group acquired the company Uganda Pharmaceuticals Ltd. (UPL, manufacturer of medicine in Uganda, from the government in 1993), and sold 30% of it to Libyan investors in 2016. From 1990 to 2016, the group invested over $75 million in development.

In 2002, the group acquired the Kenyan business formerly known as House of Manji, which was under receivership. After reviving the business, it was renamed Manji Food Industries Limited.

== Description ==
The Dawda Group is mainly involved in the manufacture of fruit juices, beverages, mineral water, confectionery and the distribution of cosmetics, hardware, and pharmaceuticals. The group is also involved in the growing of organic cotton. The conglomerate has its headquarters and majority of its businesses in Uganda, with manufacturing plants in Kenya, and distributes ts products in the countries of the East African Community, as well as exporting to Europe and Asia.

The subsidiary companies of the group include, but are not limited to, the following businesses:

- Britannia Allied Industries Limited: Ntinda, Uganda - Manufacturer of confectioneries, fruit juices, artificial drinks, mineral water and sauces.
- Charms Uganda Limited : Kampala, Uganda - Fast Moving Consumer Goods (FMCG) distributor in Uganda.
- Uganda Pharmaceuticals Limited: Jinja, Uganda - Pharmaceutical distributor and retailer.
- Manji Foods Limited: Nairobi, Kenya - Manufacturer of confectioneries.
- Masaaba Cotton Company: Mbale, Uganda - Exporter of premium roller lint to Europe, the Far East, and Japan.
- Kyoga Cotton Company: Lira, Uganda - Exporter of premium roller lint to Europe, the Far East, and Japan.
- Mika Appliances Ltd: Nairobi, Kenya - Appliance Brand selling various household Appliances.
- One 2 One Logistics: Mombasa, Kenya - Transportation of various goods throughout East Africa.
- Bahari Salt Works Ltd: Mombasa, Kenya - Manufacturing of Cooking Salt.
- DG Properties Ltd: Nairobi, Kenya - Real Estate Development.
- Panafric Chemicals Ltd: Webuye, Kenya - Manufacturing of chemical fertilizers.
- Kikuuboonline: Kampala, Uganda - E-Commerce Platform for FMCG products
- Pusha Uganda Limited : Kampala, Uganda - Fast Moving Consumer Goods (FMCG) distributor in Uganda.

== See also ==
- List of conglomerates in Uganda
- Kampala Capital City Authority
