= Fahamu =

Not-for-profit organisation

Fahamu is a not-for-profit organization supporting organizations and social movements championing progressive social change and human rights. With branches in the United Kingdom, South Africa, Senegal, and Kenya, Fahamu primarily engages with civil and human rights organizations through Pambazuka News, an online platform focusing on social justice. Additionally, they offer online courses on human rights and social justice and employ new technologies, including SMS, for information dissemination, lobbying, and interactions.

== History ==
=== 1997–2000 ===
Fahamu was established in 1997 by Firoze Manji, an exiled Kenyan activist, to address social justice and civil liberties issues with a focus on Africa. Initially, the organization operated from Manji's home. In 2000, Pambazuka News, an email newsletter providing a platform for discussion and the exchange of information on social justice in Africa, was launched. It served as an alternative media source for concerned citizens and civil society organizations with limited access to the Internet. Pambazuka News features editorials, analyses, and opinion pieces, as well as summaries of websites and opinion pieces on various topics related to Africa, including human rights, conflict, refugees, gender, and culture. Most of the writing is from within Africa. The Oxford Learning Space offered online courses and CDs for social justice work.

=== 2001–2004 ===
The Adilisha Project was launched in 2001 with financial support from the European Commission, the British Department for International Development (DFID), and the Canadian International Development Research Centre (IDRC). The University of Oxford received a grant from the EC, while Fahamu received grants from DFID and the IDRC. The objective of the project was to build the capacity of human rights organizations in the Southern African Development Community (SADC) region in the areas of campaigning, organizational, and management capabilities. The project consisted of seven training modules, including fact-finding and investigation; leadership and management; campaigning and advocacy; financial management; use of the Internet; introduction to human rights; and monitoring and reporting on human rights violations.

In May 2002, Fahamu South Africa Trust was established in Durban, South Africa, with Firoze Manji, Vinesh Anil Naidoo, and Shereen Karmali as trustees and Vinesh Anil Naidoo serving as the executive director.

In July 2003, Fahamu Trust was registered in the United Kingdom as a charity (No. 1100304), with Belinda Allan, Paddy Coulter, Shereen Karmali, Colin Burton, and Firoze Manji on the Board of Trustees.

In May 2004, Fahamu joined the steering committee of the Solidarity for African Women's Rights (SOAWR) coalition and provided Pambazuka News pages and technological support to the coalition to raise public awareness about the Protocol to the African Charter on Human and People's Rights on the Rights of Women in Africa. Fahamu contributed to SOAWR's efforts to persuade governments to ratify the African Union Protocol on the Rights of Women in Africa by publishing several special issues and using them as advocacy tools. Fahamu also set up a website for the coalition and developed a facility for people to support the protocol using mobile text messaging (SMS).

Fahamu has been recognized for its e-advocacy work, particularly its successful use of text messaging campaigns, which have been widely adopted in social justice work. In 2004, Fahamu received a Community Award for Innovations in the Use of SMS for Advocacy Work from AOL.

In December 2004, Fahamu signed an agreement with the Office of the UN High Commissioner for Human Rights to develop CD-ROMs on the prevention of torture and conflict prevention with translations into French, Spanish, and Russian. This was done in collaboration with the United Nations System Staff College, the Association for the Prevention of Torture, and the University of Oxford, to strengthen the capacity of national human rights institutions.

== Strategy ==
Fahamu's strategy over the coming years is to:

- expand the forum for human rights and social justice in Africa
- expand public awareness of human rights
- strengthen civil society organizations
- root Fahamu in Africa.

== Communications and education ==
=== Newsletters ===
Fahamu publishes Pambazuka News, which is an open-access, pan-African email and online newsletter available in English, French, and Portuguese. It has around 15,000 subscribers and an estimated weekly readership of 500,000 people, mostly in Africa. In 2007, the Pambazuka News published its 300th issue. The publication includes audio and visual content with commentary and debate from social justice movements throughout the continent. Additionally, Fahamu produces special reports, which are available for download on the Pambazuka website or published in Pambazuka News. In May 2005, Fahamu established the African Union Monitor, a website and associated electronic mailing list that provides timely and high-quality information to civil society organizations to engage constructively with the African Union and promote justice, equity, and accountability.

=== Fahamu Books and Pambazuka Press ===
Pambazuka Press, previously known as Fahamu Books, is a publishing house located in Nairobi, Cape Town, Dakar, and Oxford. They publish books written by African academics, public intellectuals, and activists on various topics such as human rights, social justice, politics, and advocacy.

In addition to publishing books, Fahamu also produces training materials on CD-ROMs to assist civil society organizations in Africa with promoting and protecting human rights, as well as improving their sustainability and effectiveness. Some of these materials are available as tutored online courses. They have collaborated with several organizations, including Food First, Grassroots International, Focus on the Global South, Mkuki na nyota, Oozebap, the South Centre, and SOAWR, in their publishing efforts.

==== Selected titles ====
- No Land! No House! No Vote! Voices from Symphony Way, by the Symphony Way Pavement Dwellers – 2011
- Chinese and African Perspectives on China in Africa, Axel Harneit-Sievers, Stephen Marks, Sanusha Naidu (eds) – 2010
- SMS Uprisings: Mobile Phone Activism in Africa, Sokari Ekine (ed.) – 2010
- The Crash of International Finance-Capital and its Implications for the Third World, Dani Wadada Nabudere – 2009
- Aid to Africa: Redeemer or Coloniser? Hakima Abbas, Yves Niyiragira (eds) – 2009
- Food Rebellions! Crisis and the Hunger for Justice, Eric Holt Giménez, Raj Patel – 2009
- Where is Uhuru? Reflections on the Struggle for Democracy in Africa, Issa G. Shivji – 2009
- Ending Aid Dependence, Yash Tandon – 2008
- China's New Role in Africa and the South, Dorothy Guerrero, Firoze Manji (eds) – 2008
- Africa's Long Road to Rights/ Long trajet de l’Afrique vers les Droits, Hakima Abbas (ed) – 2008
- Silences in NGO Discourse: The Role and Future of NGOs in Africa, Issa G. Shivji – 2007

=== Fahamu courses ===
Fahamu offers training programs and develops materials to strengthen the capacity of African human rights and social justice movements. The organization also runs courses, including distance learning, to help civil society organizations in Africa promote and protect human rights and become sustainable and effective. In partnership with institutions such as the University of Oxford and MIT, Fahamu provides education and training programs.

== Advocacy ==
In 2004, Fahamu joined the Solidarity for African Women's Rights (SOAWR), a coalition of 30 women's and international organizations, intending to promote the ratification of the African Union's Protocol on the Rights of Women in Africa. Fahamu supported the coalition by providing pages in Pambazuka News and technological support to raise public awareness about the protocol across the continent, helping women bring pressure on their governments to adopt it. The campaign was successful, with 15 countries ratifying the protocol within 15 months.

During the post-election violence in Kenya in December 2007, Fahamu supported independent and progressive voices in Kenya by becoming actively engaged in the Kenyans for Peace through Truth and Justice coalition. In April 2008, Fahamu-Kenya was involved in the Direct Action Training workshops initiated by Shailja Patel. Fahamu-Kenya is now collaborating with Bunge la Mwananchi to train grassroots activists on effective advocacy.

Fahamu has established a collaborative network of community radio stations, radio journalists, and cartoonists with the African Women's Development and Communication Network (FEMNET) to develop a range of radio plays, current affairs broadcasts, and cartoon books on the Protocol on the Rights of Women in Africa. These will be disseminated in West and East Africa.

== Awards ==
- PoliticsOnline 2005, 2006, 2007, 2008 (voted one of the top ten websites in the annual 'Top 10 Who Are Changing the World of Internet and Politics')
- Tech Museum Award 2005 (Fahamu was one of five Tech Laureates in the Microsoft Education category.)
- Highway Africa 2005 (Pambazuka News won the non-profit category for the innovative use of new media.)
- GenARDIS 2005 (Fahamu South Africa was one of the 10 winners of the Gender and Agriculture in the Information Society (GenARDIS) Award.)
- Prix Ars Electronica Awards 2005 (honorary mention)
- AOL Innovations in the Community Award 2004

== Partners ==
- AFFORD
- African Books Collective
- Article 19
- Association for the Prevention of Torture
- China Development Brief
- Development in Practice
- Editorial Nordan-Comunidad
- Equality Now
- EQUINET – Network on equity in Health in Southern Africa
- Focus on the Global South
- Gaza Community Mental Healthcare Programme
- International Development Research Centre IDRC Books
- Just Associates (JASS) Kabissa
- Mazingira Institute
- Nigerian National Human Rights Commission
- Open CourseWare Consortium
- Oxford University Department for Continuing Education
- PAMONET
- Penal reform International (Malawi)
- SOAWR
- Tactical Technology Collective
- The African Women's Development and Communication Network (FEMNET)
- The Directory of Social Change
- Media Institute of Southern Africa (MISA)
- Training and Research Support Centre
- University for Peace Africa Programme
- WITNESS
