= Feminist Africa =

Academic journal addressing feminist topics

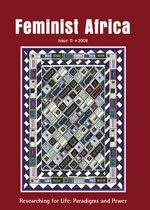
- Discipline: gender studies, African studies
- Language: English
- Edited by: Amina Mama

Publication details
- History: 2002–present
- Publisher: African Gender Institute, University of Cape Town (South Africa)
- Frequency: Irregular (once or twice per year)
- Open access: Yes
- License: Creative Commons Attribution-Share Alike 2.5

Standard abbreviations
- ISO 4: Fem. Afr.

Indexing
- ISSN: 1726-4596
- OCLC no.: 53869360

Links
- Journal homepage

Feminist Africa is a peer-reviewed academic journal that addresses feminist topics from an "African continental perspective". It is published by the African Gender Institute (University of Cape Town). Its founding editor-in-chief is Amina Mama (Mills College and University of California, Davis). It was accredited in 2005 by the South African Department of Education. This allows authors publishing in the journal to collect publication subsidy. The journal is primarily online but also distributes a small number of print copies.

== Founding ==
According to Mama, the journal was created partly in response to a bias in existing scholarship towards the "Women In Development" (WID) perspective. Particular topics covered by the journal include: women's activism, sexism in higher education, militarism and peace, and gender-related violence. Patricia van der Spuy and Lindsay Clowes write that the publication of the journal marked an important step in the development of South African feminism. Iris Berger has critiqued the journal (as an indicator of contemporary African feminism in general) for leaving out colonial and precolonial African women's history.

Feminist Africa is the first "continental" African gender studies journal. The journal publishes works by African scholars in America and discusses the situation of intellectuals across the African diaspora. These international contributors have raised the journal's profile but barred it from receiving Department of Education subsidies. Feminist Africa does not receive funds from the University of Cape Town (although it is edited by salaried UCT workers) and relies on sponsorship by international donors—particularly the Ford Foundation and Hivos.

== See also ==
- African studies
- African Identities
- Agenda
- Journal of African Cultural Studies
- Journal of Southern African Studies
- List of African studies journals
- Feminism in South Africa
