= Pambazuka News =

Pambazuka News is an open access, Pan-African e-mail and online electronic newsletter. It is published weekly in English, Portuguese and French by the not-for-profit organisation Fahamu. The word Pambazuka means "dawn" or "arise" in Kiswahili. Since its inception in 2000, the newsletter's mission has been to provide a platform for social justice in Africa, for example, by promoting human rights for refugees. As characterized by Firoze Manji, "the project differed from other publishing ventures in the sense that it was established not only to publish, but specifically to support an agenda for social change in Africa." Pambazuka News provides commentary and analysis on politics and current affairs. The estimated readership is 500,000.

Pambazuka News produces the AU Monitor, a blog that provides information to civil society organizations in Africa about the proceeds of the African Union. It also produces podcasts. Pambazuka promoted the ratification of the Protocol to the African Charter on Human and Peoples' Rights on the Rights of Women in Africa.

== Newspaper ==
Pambazuka News, which is Fahamu's flagship publication, was founded in Africa in 2000. It is published in English, French, and Portuguese. It has approximately 15,000 subscribers and an estimated weekly readership of at least 500,000 people. Its 400th issue was published in 2008. It is written and produced by a Pan-African community of over 1,200 people including academics, social activists, writers, and analysts. Pambazuka News publishes broadcasts and special reports.

== Broadcasts ==
Pambazuka broadcasts contain audio and video content. They include commentaries and debates by social justice movements across Africa. Community and mainstream radio broadcasters use the Pambazuka products.

== Special reports ==
Pambazuka News is a vehicle for the publication of special reports about social justice issues in Africa. Some special reports are available as downloadable documents.

== Awards ==
- Listed in top 10 websites for 2005–2008 in "Top 10 Who Are Changing the World of Internet and Politics" award organised by PoliticsOnline and eDemocracy Forum.
- Winner non-profit category of the sixth annual "Highway Africa" awards for the innovative use of new media.
- Fahamu is one of five Tech Laureates in the 2005 Microsoft Education Award category of the Tech Museum Awards, representing the "best of the best technologists whose innovations benefit humanity".
- AOL innovations in the community award 2004, for innovations in the use of SMS for advocacy work.
- Fahamu South Africa is one of 10 winners of the Gender and Agriculture in the Information Society (GenARDIS) 2005 Award.
- In 2004, Fahamu was second in the Stockholm Challenge awards for the development of distance-learning courses for human rights organisations.
