= Marc Stein (historian) =

American historian

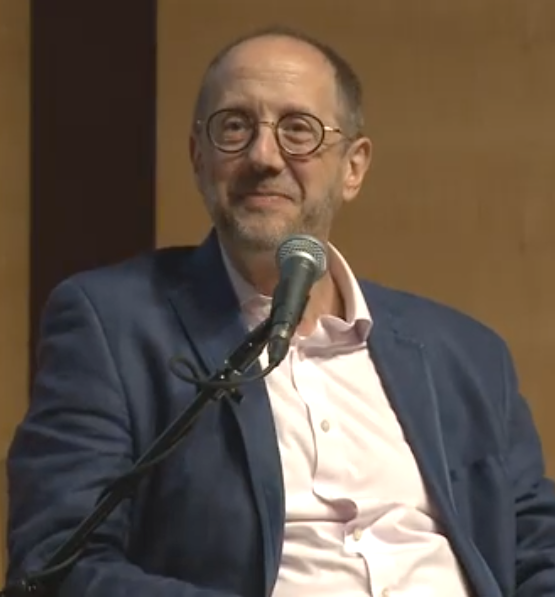
- Born: September 24, 1963 (age 63); Mount Kisco, New York, U.S.
- Occupation: Historian

Academic background
- Education: Wesleyan University; University of Pennsylvania
- Doctoral advisor: Carroll Smith-Rosenberg

Academic work
- Discipline: History
- Sub-discipline: U.S. history, LGBTQ history, Queer studies, Legal and constitutional history
- Institutions: San Francisco State University; York University; Colby College
- Notable works: City of Sisterly and Brotherly Loves: Lesbian and Gay Philadelphia, 1945–72 (2000); Sexual Injustice: Supreme Court Decisions from Griswold to Roe (2010); Rethinking the Gay and Lesbian Movement (2012); The Stonewall Riots: A Documentary History (2019); Bicentennial: A Revolutionary History of the 1970s (2026)

Marc Stein (born September 24, 1963) is an American historian of LGBTQ history in the United States, sexuality, social movements, and constitutional law. He is the Jamie and Phyllis Pasker Professor of U.S. History and Constitutional Law at San Francisco State University, director of the OutHistory website, co-editor of Queer Pasts, and President of the Organization of American Historians as of April 2026.

== Early life and education ==
Stein was born on September 24, 1963, in Mount Kisco, New York, and grew up in Peekskill and Shrub Oak in northern Westchester County, New York. In 1985, he received his Bachelor of Arts in History from Wesleyan University. After graduation, he worked at Gay Community News in Boston, first as a volunteer and then as coordinating editor.

In 1989, Stein entered the Ph.D. program in History at the University of Pennsylvania, working under the supervision of historian Carroll Smith-Rosenberg. He completed his degree in 1994 with a dissertation on lesbian and gay social movements in Philadelphia from the 1940s to the 1970s.

== Career ==
After completing his doctorate, Stein was an Andrew W. Mellon Postdoctoral Fellow in gender studies at Bryn Mawr College from 1995 to 1996. From 1996 to 1998, he was a visiting assistant professor of history at Colby College.

In 1998, Stein was hired as an assistant professor of U.S. political history at York University in Toronto. He was tenured and promoted to associate professor in 2001, was later cross-appointed to York's School of Gender, Sexuality, and Women's Studies, and was promoted to full professor in 2011.

In 2014, Stein was appointed the Jamie and Phyllis Pasker Professor of U.S. History and Constitutional Law at San Francisco State University.

== Scholarship ==
Stein's first book, City of Sisterly and Brotherly Loves: Lesbian and Gay Philadelphia, 1945–72, examined the history of LGBTQ people in Philadelphia during the first few decades after World War II, and was published by the University of Chicago Press in 2000 and in a second edition by Temple University Press in 2004.

Stein served as editor-in-chief of the three-volume Encyclopedia of Lesbian, Gay, Bisexual, and Transgender History in America, published by Scribners in 2003.

His second book, Sexual Injustice: Supreme Court Decisions from Griswold to Roe, was published by the University of North Carolina Press in 2010. The book centered on six major U.S. Supreme Court cases from the 1960s and 1970s involving abortion, birth control, interracial marriage, and obscenity, including the landmark cases Griswold v. Connecticut (1965), Boutilier v. Immigration and Naturalization Service (1967), and Roe v. Wade (1973).

Stein's third book, Rethinking the Gay and Lesbian Movement, examined the LGBTQ movement in the United States and was published by Routledge in 2012, with a second edition published in 2023.

He edited "U.S. Homophile Internationalism," a special issue of the Journal of Homosexuality about the Homophile movement, published in 2017.

Stein's fourth book, The Stonewall Riots: A Documentary History, reprinted primary sources about the Stonewall revolt, Gay liberation, and LGBTQ activism in the United States from 1965 to 1973, and was published by New York University Press in 2019.

His fifth book, Queer Public History: Essays on Scholarly Activism, was published by the University of California Press in 2022.

His most recent book, Bicentennial: A Revolutionary History of the 1970s, examined the politics of the United States Bicentennial, and was published by the University of Chicago Press in 2026.

== Awards and honors ==
Stein has received awards, grants, and fellowships for his work as a historian, editor, and teacher. In 1993, he received the inaugural Ken Dawson Award for Lesbian/Gay History from the Center for Lesbian and Gay Studies at the City University of New York Graduate Center. In 1996, he received the Gregory Sprague Prize from the Committee on Lesbian and Gay History for best graduate student chapter or essay on gay and lesbian history.

In 2001, Stein was awarded a four-year research grant by the Social Sciences and Humanities Research Council of Canada. In 2004 and 2005, the Encyclopedia of Lesbian, Gay, Bisexual, and Transgender History in America received awards and recognition from Library Journal, Booklist, the Reference and User Services Association, and the New York Public Library. In 2006, Stein's paper "Boutilier and the U.S. Supreme Court's Sexual Revolution" received the Audre Lorde Prize from the Committee on Lesbian and Gay History. In 2010, he received a Faculty of Graduate Studies Outstanding Teaching Award at York University.

In 2024–2025, Stein received a Marcus Transformative Research Award at San Francisco State University. In 2025, he was named an Organization of American Historians Distinguished Lecturer.

== Professional service ==
Stein has served in leadership roles in LGBTQ and historical organizations. From 2000 to 2003, he chaired the Committee on Lesbian and Gay History. After leading the effort to create York University's Sexuality Studies Program, he served as the program's first director from 2006 to 2009. From 2009 to 2015, he was a member of the LGBTQ Historians Task Force of the American Historical Association. In 2011–2012, he was a member of the Organization of American Historians Working Group on GLBT History. From 2013 to 2015, he was the inaugural chair of the Organization of American Historians Committee on the Status of LGBTQ Historians and Histories. Beginning in 2015, he coordinated San Francisco State University's annual "Rights and Wrongs" Constitution Day conference. Starting in 2023, Stein became the director of the LGBTQ+ public history initiative OutHistory, founded by author and historian of human sexuality Jonathan Ned Katz. In 2024–2025, he was vice-president of the Organization of American Historians. In April 2026, he became the organization's president.

== Selected works ==
- Stein, Marc (2000). City of Sisterly and Brotherly Loves: Lesbian and Gay Philadelphia, 1945–72. University of Chicago Press. ISBN 1592131301.
- Stein, Marc, ed. (2003). Encyclopedia of Lesbian, Gay, Bisexual, and Transgender History in America. Scribners. ISBN 0684312611.
- Stein, Marc (2010). Sexual Injustice: Supreme Court Decisions from Griswold to Roe. University of North Carolina Press. ISBN 1469600889.
- Stein, Marc (2012). Rethinking the Gay and Lesbian Movement. Routledge. ISBN 036776198X.
- Stein, Marc (2019). The Stonewall Riots: A Documentary History. New York University Press. ISBN 147981685X.
- Stein, Marc (2022). Queer Public History: Essays on Scholarly Activism. University of California Press. ISBN 0520304314.
- Stein, Marc (2026). Bicentennial: A Revolutionary History of the 1970s. University of Chicago Press. ISBN 0226847411.
