= Fear of medical procedures =

Some people have a fear of medical procedures at some point in their lifetime, which can include the fear of surgery, dental work, doctors, or needles. These fears are seldom diagnosed or treated, as they are often extinguished into adulthood and do not often develop into phobias preventing individuals from seeking medical attention. Formally, medical fear is defined as "any experience that involves medical personnel or procedures involved in the process of evaluating or modifying health status in traditional health care settings."

Iatrophobia is the extreme fear of medical attention, even with signs of a serious illness. The term "iatrophobia" comes from the Greek words iatros, meaning healer, and phobos, meaning fear. While there is no information regarding the prevalence of iatrophobia specifically, a survey found that 1 in 3 Americans avoid going to the doctor, even when they feel it is necessary. Rates of iatrophobia likely increased following the COVID-19 pandemic, where individuals experiencing iatrophobia avoided testing for the virus or visiting a physician with symptoms.

== Classification ==
Fear of medical procedures can be classified under a broader category of "blood, injection, and injury phobias". This is one of five subtypes that classify specific phobias. A specific phobia is defined as a "marked and persistent fear that is excessive or unreasonable, cued by the presence (or anticipation) of a specific object or situation." Often these fears begin to appear in childhood, around the age of five to nine. It is normal to become squeamish at the sight of blood, injury, or gross deformity, but many overcome these fears by the time they reach adulthood. Those who do not are more likely to avoid medical and dental procedures necessary to maintain health, jobs, etc. Research shows that when people encounter something that they have a specific phobia of many of them have a feeling of disgust which makes them not want to come near or experience the object or situation which is disgusting to them. This feeling of disgust, especially in the blood, injection, and injury phobias may be passed down in families. Women have been known to avoid becoming pregnant because it requires blood and medical examinations that they would rather avoid. Also, most individuals who experience phobias have an increased heart rate upon encountering the thing they fear, but blood, injection, injury-phobic people also seem to have an increase of fainting after the initial speeding up of heart rate. Their heart rate will go up and then slow again, leading to nausea, sweating, pallor, and fainting. This fainting can also lead to seizures, making life very difficult for those who have this fear. However, only 4.5% of individuals who have this phobia as a child will have this fear their entire lifetime. Additionally, procedural anxiety is frequently recognized in people who need to take part in medical procedures regularly. Due to their constant exposure to these procedures, patients may attend their treatments with recurrent experiences of significant anxiety, sometimes associated with previous negative experiences. For those who do experience this phobia in an extreme manner, specific coping treatments have been found to help them. Biological treatments, such as medications used for other anxiety ailments, are generally found to be inappropriate for fear of medical procedures or other specific phobias. Psychological treatments are the treatment of choice because they are more accurate at addressing the problem. Some of these treatments used especially for fear of medical procedures include exposure-based treatments, eye movement desensitization and reprocessing, and applied tension to react against fainting.

== Signs and diagnosis ==
A situational-specific phobia is defined as an extreme or irrational fear of or aversion to particular situations. While it can be common to feel nervous before a doctor appointment, iatrophobia expands beyond a general anxiety for medical experiences. Signs of iatrophobia include, but are not limited to:

- Postponing or rearranging medical appointments, neglecting preventive care, or missing vaccinations.
- Managing symptoms independently rather than consulting a healthcare professional.
- Experiencing elevated blood pressure in clinical settings, known as white coat hypertension.
- Difficulty sleeping, skipping meals, crying, or struggling to focus due to anxiety about an upcoming medical visit.
- Feeling fearful of healthcare providers, hospitals, or specific illnesses, beyond just a fear of doctors.

In the recent past years post-COVID-19, people have become more wary of doctor visits due to virus exposure, and negative experiences during the pandemic, such as uncomfortable or painful swab tests, have created fearful attitudes towards clinical experiences. People with iatrophobia may be less likely to seek testing after a known virus exposure or symptoms.

Formal diagnosis according to the American Psychiatric Association (APA):

- Experience an intense fear of doctors or medical tests for at least six months
- Symptoms begin or worsen when visiting a doctor, undergoing medical tests, or even thinking about such situations
- Intense fear or anxiety that leads to avoiding medical visits or tests, even when you are feeling sick
- Physical or emotional symptoms that negatively impact your overall health and daily life
- Overwhelming fear, anxiety, or a sense of dread that is out of proportion to any actual medical threat

Consistent avoidance of medical treatment can put patients at serious risk of medical issues and disease complications that affect future quality of life and longevity. Regular medical exams and tests, such as blood pressure and cholesterol levels, are crucial to sustaining good health.

== Fear of surgery ==
Fear of surgery or other invasive medical procedure is known as tomophobia. Fear of surgery is not a fear experienced often, but is still just as harmful as other phobias that are more common. Since surgery is not a common occurrence, the fear is based on inexperience or something that is out of the ordinary. Surgery is a strong stressor that can trigger physiological reactions such as tachycardia, hypertension, hyperventilation, hyperthermia, muscle tension, sweating, and psychological reactions such as fear, anxiety, and acute panic attacks. This fear is one of those categorized under all fears of medical procedures that can be experienced by anyone, all ages, and have little need for actual psychological treatment, unless it is uncharacteristically causing the patient to react in a way that would be harmful to his or her health.

=== Children ===
Fear of surgery is common among young children. Christine Gorman, of Kids and Surgery, states "Surgery is scary enough for adults. But imagine what goes through the mind of a three-year-old when he sees a doctor or nurse all suited up and wearing a surgical mask: "It's a monster! It's got big eyes and no mouth! It's taking me away from Mommy and Daddy." No wonder half of all children from ages of 2 to 10 show evidence of distress—from bed-wetting to nightmares—for at least two weeks after their operation. Some of them remain traumatized even six months later." This statement shows that the fear that comes when young children go into surgery can be a serious matter because they are still traumatized by the effects for weeks after the surgery has taken place. Being scared of surgery has led to "eating disorders, sleep disturbances, regression to earlier levels of behavior, depression, and somatization such as loss of voice after tonsillectomy." Many children see surgery as a form of punishment and, since they sometimes can't see what they did "wrong", the fear is escalated, leaving greater chance for a longer effect on the psychological and emotional feelings of the child. Many ways have been tried to help children overcome this fear, including their parents and doctors simply telling them that the surgery won't hurt, or sedatives given by the doctor to minimize the feelings of anxiety later. There are certain types of treatments that have been proven to be better methods than others. Some hospitals allow parents to come into the surgery room and stay with the child, calming them until the anesthetic has taken effect. This is noted to keep anxiety down for both the parent and the child. If the child can enter the surgery calmly, there is much less of a chance that they will have many complications after the surgery due to fear. Other ways to treat the fear of surgery for children include having a doctor explain to them what the surgery is going to do and acting out the operation on a doll or stuffed animal. This makes the surgery something less scary and able to be understood in the child's mind. When the surgery is understood by the child, the fear of the unknown is less of a factor of how scared the child will be, and how much that will impact their reaction to the surgery.

=== Adults ===
Children are not the only ones to express fear of surgery or have after effects that can affect their mental and physical well-being. Adults most fear the pain they expect to receive from the surgery. "The Roche Pain Management Survey polled 500 Americans, 27% of whom had surgery during the previous five years. Of those who had surgery, 77% reported pain afterwards, with four out of five of those saying they experienced moderate to extreme pain. 70%, indicated they experienced pain even after receiving medication; 80% reported they received pain medication on time, although 33% had to ask for it; and 16% had to wait for medication." Unlike children, adults seem to have less fear of the surgery itself, but rather fear of the effects of surgery.

Milano and Kornfeld in 1980 said "Any operation is a destructive invasion of the body and therefore frightens many patients". Some operations seem to invoke more fear from patients than others. Aged persons who require cataract surgery often fear the procedure, even though success is very likely. The fear of going blind because of the surgery is more apparent in women, who over all fear surgery more than men. The cataract is a disease that attacks the lens, causing it to swell until sight becomes obscured. Operation is recommended when the disease begins to hamper everyday activities. Even though becoming blind was the only option without the surgery, over 25% of the patients were afraid of becoming blind as a result of the surgery: 34% feared the failure of the operation. Ritva Fagerström, concerning the fears of cataract operation said, "These fears are understandable as the condition of the retina was not known in advance," Two women out of 75, taking part in a study dealing with the fear of cataract operation felt that the experience of the first operation was so bad that they would not agree to have the second eye operated on. If a patient had this fear, understandable, and did not go through with the surgery, the blindness that would follow would keep them from being able to do normal things, easily leading them into situations of depression, or other dangerous situations which would be destructive to their overall health. Ways to overcome this fear are specific to the individual. Fear of surgery can be harmful to the patient if not taken care of properly before the surgery. Preoperative education and counseling, the aim of which is to provide the patient with reliable and accessible information, has been found to have a huge positive impact on reducing the fear and anxiety associated with surgery. Often adults seem to become less fearful when given more information about the surgery, those who will be performing it, or the things to expect during recovery; 69% said that they had received much information and half of the patients trusted the ophthalmologist to do his best. A well-conducted preoperative information session should consider patient needs and the specificity of their age. Sufficient time should be devoted and allow them to asking questions. The type of information that is given and the way it is communicated are also important. People who are more knowledgeable about the procedure and those who accept the proposed treatments are usually less stressed. It has been established that older people prefer traditional methods of surgical education, while younger patients are eager to use multimedia (computer-animated videos), while both age-specific populations still prefer direct contact with the operating physician in easing the psychological distress associated with fear of surgery.

== Fear of dental work ==
Fear of surgery is not the only fear based on medical procedures that can be harmful to the health of those who experience it; fear of dental work can also be dangerous if taken to an extreme. Dental fear has been ranked fifth among the most common fears. (DeJongh, Morris, Schoemakers, & Ter Horst, 1995) Those who start with dental fear when they are young and continue with it into adulthood can have total avoidance of all dental work, causing problems for their health. Fear of dental care is often diagnosed using a fear measurement instrument like Corah's Dental Anxiety Scale or the Modified Dental Anxiety Scale.

=== Children ===
Dental fear in children varies from 3%-21% depending on age and method used to measure dental fear. "A very young child may find the smells of a dental surgery and the sounds of the equipment working very overwhelming" says H.R. Chapman and N. C. Kirby-Turner. Such overwhelming situations can make a child afraid and if the fear is not corrected, it can become harder to get the child to participate in dental procedures.

Some forms of treatment for children who do experience dental fear include allowing the family to come into the room with them to allow the child to see that the other members of the family are not scared, allowing the child to have time to explore the room and the equipment used on them, under the supervision of the dentist, to become familiar with the things surrounding them. Other methods include tell-show-do, positive reinforcement, distraction, nonverbal communication or even general anesthesia and conscious sedation.

=== Adults ===
When fear of dental work is not overcome in childhood it is very likely to continue into adulthood, causing a total avoidance of dental visits, which can lead to poor hygiene and lack of proper care for their teeth. Both age and gender have huge differences in how people express and deal with their fear of dental work. Overall women express a fear of dental procedures more than men. Although dental anxiety is shown to be lower in men than in women, men expect more pain from the procedure. This expectance of pain leads many to miss appointments and be unwilling to seek professional help for simple things like toothaches. These simple things can lead to larger problems resulting in decaying teeth and poorly cared for gums. Age also makes a difference in how dental work is dealt with. Dental fear in young adults (ages 18–23) is significantly higher than fear in adults (ages 26–79) showing that over the years, with maturity the fear of dental work decreases. Still many are making appointments and breaking them or not making them at all, leading to a deterioration of their dental condition.

Treatment for this medical fear is similar to that of the treatment of adults who fear surgery. Explanations of what is going on can help, also dentists speaking to patients with less embarrassing wording (such as calling what they have a phobia or treating them like a child while discussing their problem) to encourage them to express and cope with their dental fear.

== Fear of doctors and fear of needles ==
=== Fear of doctors ===
People of all ages deal with fear of doctors (iatrophobia). Children often express fear by trying to hide from doctors when their parents take them in for checkups or by trying to avoid going to the doctor by not telling their parents when they don't feel well. This fear as a child can be easily treated in much the same way that doctors deal with children in surgery. An explanation or example (like seeing the doctor check an older sibling, or a stuffed animal) can help a child feel more comfortable with what the doctor will do for them.

Fear of doctors for adults can be extreme. Avoidance of visiting a doctor can lead to problems with not only short term but also long-term health. There is a medical condition called white coat hypertension that deals with the raising of high blood pressure while in the presence of doctors. Such high blood pressure is not good for health considerations, so this fear leads to more complications in health aspects of life for those who deal with it.

=== Fear of needles ===
The fear of needles (also known as trypanophobia) is sometimes a complex condition that can result in poor health outcomes, even death, when the avoidance of needles prevents individuals from seeking basic medical attention. Pre-school children are the most prone among children to be unwilling to cooperate and to express a variety of negative reactions, which are usually triggered by anticipated pain. These responses coincide with their ability to efficiently describe the intensity and areas on their body that they feel pain. In response, healthcare facilities are increasingly employing Certified Child Life Specialists and/or skilled nurses to promote effective coping for children undergoing medical experiences within a medical setting using psychosocial activities. Current vaccine recommendations in children may vary from country to country, but their number does not exceed 30 world-wide. Interestingly, toddlers display a drop in vaccination coverage and compliance to scheduled doctor visits when compared to infants. Vaccinations are a common cause of distress in the toddler age group, but the success of every vaccination program relies on high immunization rates. Needle-associated pain is the key factor that children fear when visiting a doctor's office, regardless if they are having a shot or not. Although even healthy children experience fear and anxiety with frequent medical procedures involving needles such as blood draws or immunizations, some individuals who fear needles may refuse to receive shots that are mandatory, thus leading to greater risk of getting certain diseases, and many avoid treatment for serious medical conditions. Needle phobia is unique in the fact that it is a phobia that is documented to have resulted directly in the deaths of a few patients.

In order to mitigate the effects of fear of needles in children, many treatment and distraction techniques have been evaluated in their ability to reduce report of pain, distress, and physiological responses to stress. Play-based distraction strategies such as bubble blowing, interaction with a robot, engagement with desired toys/electronic devices, engagement with a trained hospital support clown, illusion kaleidoscopes, reading developmentally books, have been found to benefit pre-schoolers in terms of coping with needle-related medical procedures. Virtual reality (VR) technology has been used to manage the pain and anxiety associated with medical procedures in both children and adults, enabling researchers or clinicians to modify multimodal input stimuli to make patients feel "present" in the projected environment. Immersive VR technology provides a visual and auditory distraction experience, allowing medical professionals to efficiently reduce the pain patients report undergoing painful procedures by completely distracting attention from the stimulus.

In the New England Journal of Medicine, Lountzis and Rahman published an article about a 34-year-old woman who had a growth on her fingers that doctors were unable to completely remove because of her fear of needles.

== Sociopolitical contributions ==
=== Race ===
The historical treatment of people of color–especially of individuals in the Black community–has impacted, and continues to influence, the quality of the medical care they receive. It has also transcended boundaries between physicians and their patients, affecting consent and their prescribed medications. Iatrophobia is particularly common in communities of color given past medical experiences, best described as "the transgenerational transmission of racism [that] encompasses the historic racialized experiences of entire peoples and the stories of race and racism they pass down through the generations."

In 1961, Fannie Lou Hamer felt a "knot" in her stomach, leading her to seek medical attention in a hospital. Upon her return to her family's shack on a plantation, she learned that her surgeon had not only removed a benign tumor–they also removed her uterus, leaving her sterile. The sterilization of specifically Black women was common in the mid-1900s as a component of the eugenics movement. Originally popularized by German doctors at the start of Hitler's reign, eugenics sought to pass down solely "desirable" characteristics to future generations of children. In controlling Black communities, "eugenics was appropriated to label Black women as sexually indiscriminate and as bad mothers who were constrained by biology to give birth to defective children."

This belief caused institutions, like "family planning centers", to understand and implement the "best way of reducing the Black population by promoting eugenic principles". During this time, "visual or verbal evidence of African ancestry was enough to justify immediate secret sterilization in on-side clinics under Special Commission No. 3." Eugenic principles were similarly publicized in the media, including in the film The Black Stork, where the creator, Dr. Harry J. Haiselden, "repeatedly equated black with ugliness and undesirability".

The eugenics principles were the root of the common treatments we see in practice today. Margaret Sanger, founder of Planned Parenthood and birth control advocate, used her belief in eugenics to target communities of color and of individuals with disabilities to reduce the number of children they conceive. Many of the current gynecological practices were developed by the "Father of Modern Gynecology", James Marion Sims, who performed his original research on enslaved Black women without anesthesia and, most importantly, without their consent.

It is crucial to understand the history of medical treatments in communities of color to contextualize iatrophobia today. The knowledge of why people of color may avoid medical attention can assist physicians as they work to find methods of care that will better suit their patients.

=== Gender ===
The relationship between gender, race, and medicine has a deep historical basis that continues to shape modern experiences with healthcare. In particular, the concept of iatrophobia—a fear or distrust of medical institutions—has been transmitted across generations, especially within communities that have experienced gendered and racialized harm. Women are also more likely to develop phobias, especially anxiety disorders. In this way, this historical trauma is not simply individual but collective, and it extends to the avoidance and distrust of institutions and systems.

In the context of American history, women have long been dismissed and discriminated against within a patriarchal society, and the medical field is no exception. Many women's fears of medical treatment are shaped by inter-generational narratives—stories passed down from mothers, grandmothers, sisters, and other female figures—of neglect, dismissal, or mistreatment. These shared experiences have fostered a legacy of caution and skepticism toward medical care.

The legacy of eugenics further deepens this mistrust. In the early 20th century, efforts to control reproduction disproportionately targeted Indigenous communities, African Americans, disabled individuals, and the poor: these practices were framed as public health or population control efforts but were rooted in systemic oppression. By 1983, African-American women—who made up just 6% of the U.S. population—accounted for 43% of those sterilized through government-sponsored family planning programs. Fannie Lou Hamer famously referred to this practice as the "Mississippi Appendectomy," a term used to describe the involuntary sterilization of Black women without their knowledge or consent.

This history of medical violence is further underscored by the foundations of modern Obstetrics and Gynecology. The specialty largely rests on the work of J. Marion Sims, often called the "father of modern gynecology". However, Sims' experimental surgeries in the mid-1800s were primarily conducted on enslaved Black people in Montgomery, Alabama, without the use of anesthesia. His legacy exemplifies how racial and gendered exploitation were embedded in the development of medical knowledge, contributing to enduring mistrust among communities that were dehumanized in the very creation of the Obstetrics and Gynecology field.

Understanding the historical intersections of gender, race, and medicine is essential to addressing the deep-seated mistrust that persists within historically marginalized communities. Iatrophobia reflects lived realities and generational trauma rooted in systemic neglect and abuse. These histories are not confined to the past, and they continue to inform how individuals engage with healthcare today. Reckoning with the dual nature of medicine—as both a place of healing and a source of harm—requires a collective effort to rebuild trust, center patient voices, and hold institutions accountable.

== Recommendations ==
=== Iatrophobia in the physician-patient encounter ===
The conceptual framework finds that the determinants of iatrophobia are found in three categories: patient fear of illness and the medical exam, patient fear of physician reaction, and patient fear related to barriers to care. These categories represent influences from individual to more system-related factors associated with the physician-patient relationship.

Iatrophobia, the fear of doctors or medical treatment, presents a significant challenge in the patient-physician encounter. Patients with this condition:

- may delay seeking necessary care
- withhold critical information
- low levels of medication concordance
- exhibit heightened anxiety during medical visits
- limit information from patient and gain of knowledge from physician

All of which potentially compromise diagnosis and treatment outcomes.

=== Techniques to implement ===
Physicians encountering patients with iatrophobia must approach interactions with heightened sensitivity, employing techniques such as:

- transparent communication
- shared decision-making
- gradual exposure to medical procedures

Establishing trust through active listening, validating concerns without judgment, and maintaining a calm, predictable environment can help mitigate anxiety. The physician's awareness of nonverbal cues—both their own and the patient's—becomes especially important, as does consideration for the power dynamics inherent in medical settings. Ultimately, addressing iatrophobia within the clinical encounter requires patience and a collaborative approach that acknowledges the patient's fears while gently guiding them toward appropriate medical care.

Additionally, some studies have shown that the current foundation of race and class bias often contributes to iatrophobia in patients and increases the rate of negative relationships in healthcare between physicians and patients. Some strategies to specifically address mistrust and racialized experiences could include:

- improving provider diversity and opportunities for race-concordant interactions
- creating spaces and communication frameworks that may improve therapeutic relationships
- race-conscious approaches to research that prioritizes perspectives of Black patients
