= Race Suicide =

Race suicide may refer to:

- Race suicide, a concept in eugenics
- Race Suicide (1916 film), an American short film directed by George Terwilliger
- Race Suicide (1938 film), an American film produced by Willis Kent
