= OutHistory =

- Screenshot of OutHistory.org homepage
- Available in: English
- Owner: University of Illinois at Chicago
- Creator: Jonathan Ned Katz
- Website: outhistory.org
- Commercial: No
- Launched: 2004; 22 years ago
- Current status: Online

OutHistory.org is a public history website about lesbian, gay, bisexual, transgender, queer, and heterosexual history, with a non-exclusive focus on the United States and Canada. Historians contributing to the site are especially interested in documenting under-represented histories and fostering historical research that contributes to positive social change.

The site features over 200 digital exhibitions on various topics of LGBTQ+ history, built from primary sources and contextualized by brief texts written by guest scholars who have curated each exhibition. A “bookshelf” features books written by historians on LGBTQ+ topics. OutHistory is increasingly being used by teachers to introduce students to primary sources and historical analysis relating to the LGBTQ+ past. The content of OutHistory.org is provided primarily by volunteers. OutHistory receives non-profit status as a project of the Fund for the City of New York. The organization is funded by donations from users. To donate, see https://outhistory.org/donate.

OutHistory.org was founded in 2004 by Jonathan Ned Katz, author of author of Gay American History: Lesbians and Gay Men in the U.S.A. (1976), Gay/Lesbian Almanac: A New Documentary (1983), The Invention of Heterosexuality (1995), Love Stories: Sex Between Men Before Heterosexuality (2001), The Daring Life and Dangerous Times of Eve Adams (2021), and other works on the history of sexuality and gender. An initial grant in 2005 from the Zebra Fund at the Funding Exchange allowed Katz to begin the work.

OutHistory.org was produced in its first four years by the Center for Lesbian and Gay Studies (CLAGS), located at the City University of New York Graduate Center. The collaboration with CLAGS made possible a two-year, $100,000 grant by the Arcus Foundation to hire Cidamon, a New York-based web design and development company to design the first site using open-source MediaWiki software. The grant also funded the hiring of a part-time site director. The site was officially launched in 2008, with Lauren Jae Gutterman as the third project coordinator. A second Arcus grant supported content creation through the “Since Stonewall Local Histories Contest,” an effort to encourage community history research. Many of those submissions are now featured on this site. In 2011, John D'Emilio, Professor of History at the University of Illinois, Chicago and an OutHistory director, led a redesign of the site using Omeka, an open-source web publishing platform developed by the Roy Rosenzweig Center for History and New Media at George Mason University. This new version of OutHistory launched in September 2013.

In 2013, Claire Bond Potter, Professor of History at The New School, joined Katz and D'Emilio as a director. D'Emilio and Potter continued serving as OutHistory directors until 2019. Randall Sell and Kimon Keramidas served as directors from 2017 to 2020. Historian Marc Stein has been the director since January 1, 2023. Since 2023, OutHistory has been supported by an Advisory Board composed of academics and community-based historians. OutHistory.org has collaborated with other LGBTQ history sites, archives, newspapers, magazines, museum projects, and art galleries, as well as interested researchers. OutHistory.org has partnered with the Arcus Foundation to award recipients of the LGBTQ Local Histories Contest for excellent contributions to OutHistory.org on local history topics.

OutHistory.org was awarded the 2010 Allan Bérubé Prize in Public History by the Committee on LGBT History of the American Historical Association.

In May 2016, OutHistory celebrated the fortieth anniversary of the publication of Gay American History with a conference co-chaired by Claire Potter and Daniel Marshall, Senior Lecturer in Writing and Literature at Deakin University in Melbourne, Australia, and managed by Kevin Ewing. The 2016 conference, co-sponsored by Arcus, CLAGS, and The New School, brought together hundreds of LGBTQ historians and activists to celebrate the state of our field and learn from one another.

In 2023, OutHistory launched a Fellowship Program which supports the creation of digital exhibitions by fellows, who receive modest stipends for this work.
