= James Kiernan =

James Kiernan may refer to:

- James G. Kiernan, American psychologist
- James Lawlor Kiernan (1837–1869), Irish-born general in the Union Army during the American Civil War
