= CLAGS: The Center for LGBTQ Studies =

Research center at the Graduate Center, CUNY

Center for Lesbian and Gay Studies
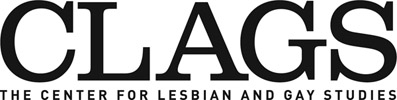

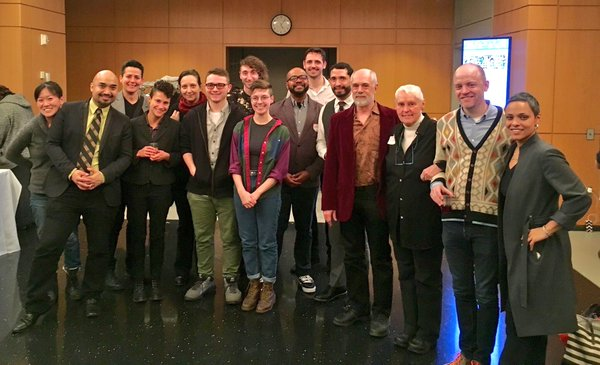
- CLAGS board and staff at 25th Anniversary Conference
- Abbreviation: CLAGS
- Formation: 1991
- Founder: Martin Duberman
- Type: NGO
- Purpose: to provide a platform for intellectual leadership in addressing issues that affect lesbian, gay, bisexual transgender, and queer individuals and other sexual and gender minorities
- Location: New York City, United States
- Official language: English
- Executive director: Matt Brim
- Website: www.clags.org

CLAGS: The Center for LGBTQ Studies (formerly known as Center for Lesbian and Gay Studies or CLAGS) was founded in 1991 by professor Martin Duberman as the first university-based research center in the United States dedicated to the study of historical, cultural, and political issues of lesbian, gay, bisexual, and transgender (LGBTQ) individuals and communities. Housed at the Graduate Center, CUNY, CLAGS sponsors public programs and conferences, offers fellowships to individual scholars, and functions as a conduit of information. It also serves as a national center for the promotion of scholarship that fosters social change.

The center is located at the Graduate Center of the City University of New York, 365 Fifth Avenue, in New York City. Past executive directors include Martin Duberman (1992), Jill Dolan (1995), Alissa Solomon (2000), Paisley Currah (2003), Sarah Chinn (2009), James Wilson (2012), Kevin Nadal (2014), and Justin Brown (2017). Nadal was the first person of color to hold the executive director role. The current executive director is Matt Brim (2023).

CLAGS also provides scholarships and fellowships to members of the LGBTQ community. Some awards include the Robert Giard fellowship for visual arts (photography and videography), the Sylvia Rivera award for best paper in Transgender Studies, the Kessler Award for lifetime contributions to LGBTQ Studies, and the José Esteban Muñoz Award for activism.

== History ==
CLAGS was founded by Martin Duberman, a professor of History at the Graduate Center, CUNY. Many CLAGS founders claim that initial conversations about a research institute on lesbian and gay people began in Duberman's living room in 1985.

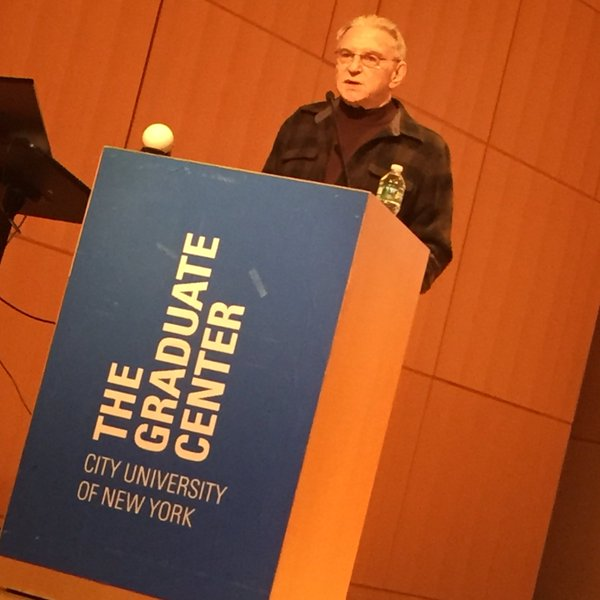
Martin Duberman, CLAGS Founder, speaking at CLAGS 25th Anniversary Conference on March 4, 2016

In 1986, Duberman described how there was an increase in literature and research on lesbian and gay people. "My aim was political as well as intellectual: I felt that lesbian and gay scholars had much to tell the mainstream world about gender and sexuality and that their findings needed to be widely disseminated, not least as a way to contest right-wing propaganda about homosexuality as degenerate and criminal." Duberman also described the intentionality of gender parity, in that they attempted to ensure that both lesbian women and gay men were included in the leadership and membership of the center.

In 2004, Jonathan Ned Katz founded OutHistory, a website dedicated to documenting and preserving LGBTQ history. Funding was received by the Arcus Foundation, which enabled CLAGS to develop and host the site. Eventually, John D'Emilio redesigned the site and housed it at University of Illinois at Chicago

In 2014, CLAGS was renamed CLAGS: The Center for LGBTQ Studies, in an effort to be inclusive of all sexualities and genders - in addition to just lesbians and gay men.

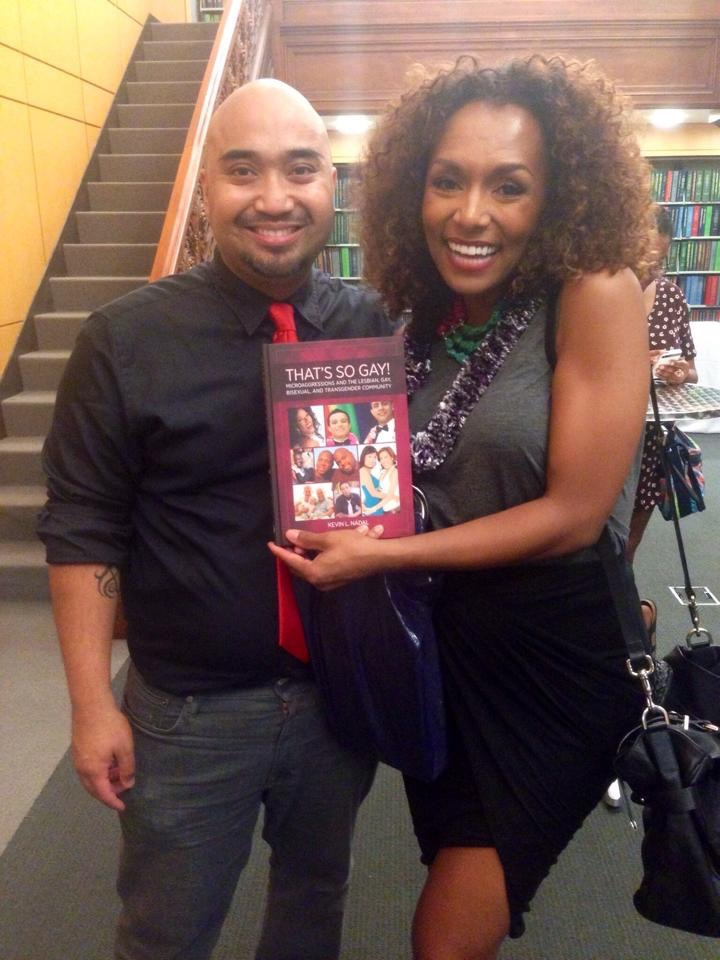
Kevin Nadal and Janet Mock at CLAGS 2015 Munoz Award

That same year, CLAGS founded the LGBTQ Scholars of Color network, which aims to connect and advance LGBTQ people of color in academia, scholarship, and research. The inaugural LGBTQ Scholars of Color Conference gathered 200 attendees at John Jay College of Criminal Justice.

In 2016, CLAGS celebrated their 25th anniversary at the CUNY Graduate Center with a conference that reunited its Founders and past executive directors, as well as a celebration at New York City's Lesbian, Gay, Bisexual & Transgender Community Center. Women's Studies Quarterly highlighted the history of CLAGS in their issue on Queer Methods, featuring reflections by founder Martin Duberman, former Executive Director Jill Dolan, and then Executive Director Kevin Nadal.

== Kessler Award ==
CLAGS' most prestigious award is the annual Kessler Award, which is given to an individual who has contributed significantly to LGBTQ Studies. Past winners of the Kessler Award include: Joan Nestle, Martin Duberman, Susan Stryker, Judith Butler, Jonathan Ned Katz, Cathy J. Cohen, Edmund White, Barbara Smith, Cheryl Clarke, Richard Fung, Sarah Schulman, Gayle Rubin, John D'Emilio, Urvashi Vaid, Monique Wittig, Samuel R. Delany, Eve Kosofsky Sedgwick, Cherríe Moraga, Isaac Julien, Adrienne Rich, Douglas Crimp, and Carole Vance In 2016, the Kessler winner was Dean Spade, whose talk was titled "When We Win We Lose: Mainstreaming and the Redistribution of Respectability". In following years, the Kessler Award was given to Sara Ahmed (2017), Amber Hollibaugh (2018), Jasbir Puar (2019), Roderick Ferguson (2020), David Eng (2021), Juana María Rodríguez (2022), E. Patrick Johnson (2023), Heather Love (2024), Robert Reid-Pharr (2025), and Lisa Duggan (2026).

== Munoz Award ==
José Esteban Muñoz was a Professor of Cultural Studies and Queer Studies at New York University. He was also a board member of CLAGS in the early 2000s. When Munoz died unexpectedly in 2013, CLAGS created the Munoz Award in honor of an LGBTQ activist who has promoted LGBTQ Studies in their own work. The recipient of the award engages in a public conversation with the CLAGS executive director on topics related to LGBTQ communities.

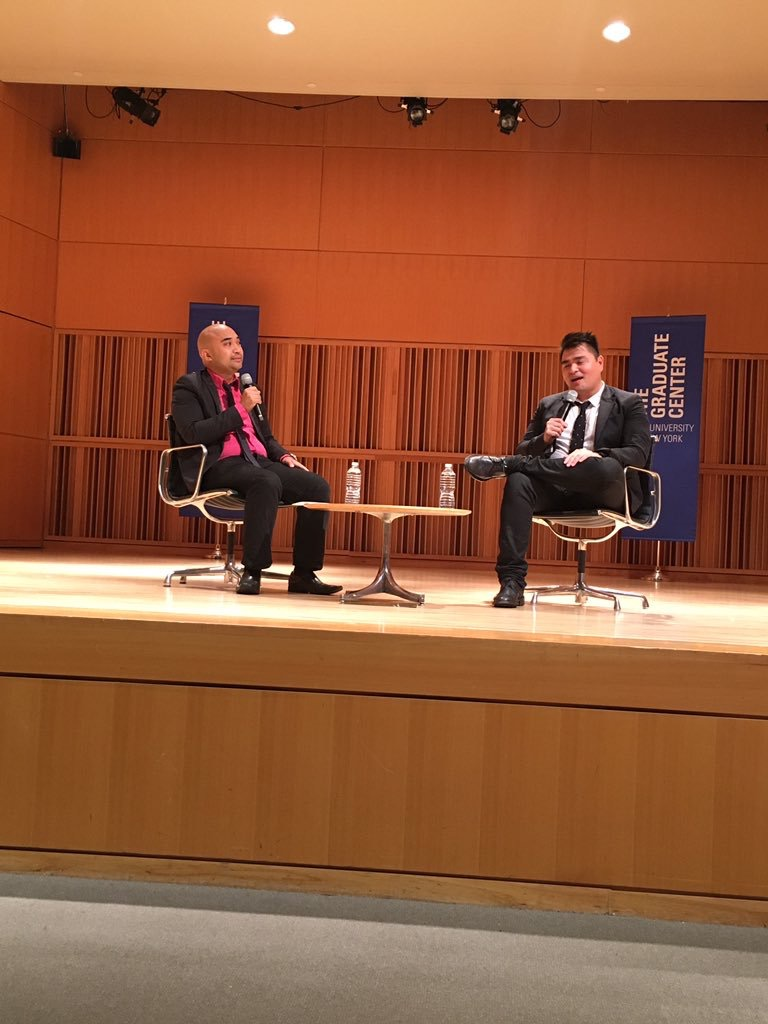
The 2016 CLAGS Munoz Award featuring a conversation with Kevin Nadal and Jose Antonio Vargas

In 2015, CLAGS presented its inaugural Munoz Award to Janet Mock. In this conversation, Mock discussed her new book Redefining Realness: My Path to Womanhood, Identity, Love & So Much More, the increase of murders of transgender women of color, and intersectional identities.

In 2016, the award was given to Jose Antonio Vargas. The event took place just nine days after the Orlando nightclub shooting at the Pulse nightclub. In addition to the tragedy, Nadal and Vargas discussed issues related to immigration, race, and social justice.

The 2017 Munoz Award winners were Wilson Cruz, Frenchie Davis, and Nathan Lee Graham.

In following years, the award was given to Patrisse-Khan Cullors (2018). Cheryl Dunye (2019), Carmelita Tropicana (2021), Miss Major (2023), Alok Vaid-Menon (2024), Angela Davis (2025), and Qween Jean (2026).

== Conferences ==
CLAGS hosts at least one conference a year, focusing on a range of topics like "Lesbians in the 1970s" to "Gay American History". In 2015, CLAGS hosted the first Queers and Comics conference. The keynote speakers were Alison Bechdel and Howard Cruse.

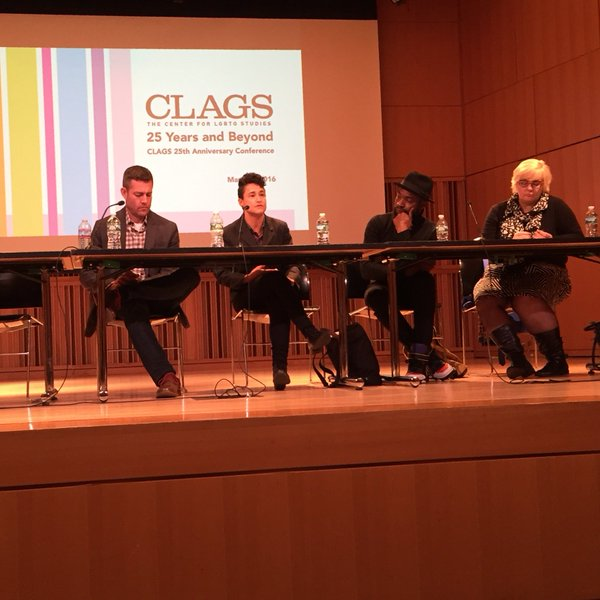
Panel at CLAGS 25th Anniversary Conference, with Matt Brim, Yana Calou, Darnell L. Moore, and Jessie Daniels

One of the CLAGS early conferences was held in 1995. It was titled "Lesbian and Gay History", and Susan Stryker discussed her experience the conference as a reference point of the climate of the LGBT community during the early transgender movement.

The first LGBTQ Scholars of Color National Conference was in 2015. Keynote speakers of the inaugural conference include Geena Rocero, Tania Israel, and David Malebranche. The conference was coordinated by Kevin Nadal and Debra Joy Perez.

In 2016, CLAGS hosted the "After Marriage" conference, a gathering of hundreds to discuss the state of LGBTQ communities after Obergefell v. Hodges, the 2015 Supreme Court of the United States decision which legalized same-sex marriage in the United States. Speakers included Steven Thrasher, Urvashi Vaid, Amber L. Hollibaugh, and Jennicet Gutiérrez.

== Seminars in the City ==
The "Seminars in the City" series was created in the late 1990s as a way of offering Queer Studies to the general public. Historically, these seminars have been taught by professors affiliated with CLAGS, and these were initially held at A Different Light bookstore in Chelsea. Topics have included "Lesbian Lives, Theories, and Herstories"; "Queer Sex Work in the City"; and "Bringing Queer to the K-12 Classroom".

- LGBT history
