= Are You Fit to Marry? =

Are You Fit to Marry? could refer to:

- The Black Stork, a 1917 American silent film promoting eugenic practices, re-edited and re-released in 1927 under the title Are You Fit to Marry?
- Damaged Goods (1937 film), a 1937 American film about sexually transmitted diseases, also known as Are You Fit to Marry?
