= Race Suicide (1916 film) =

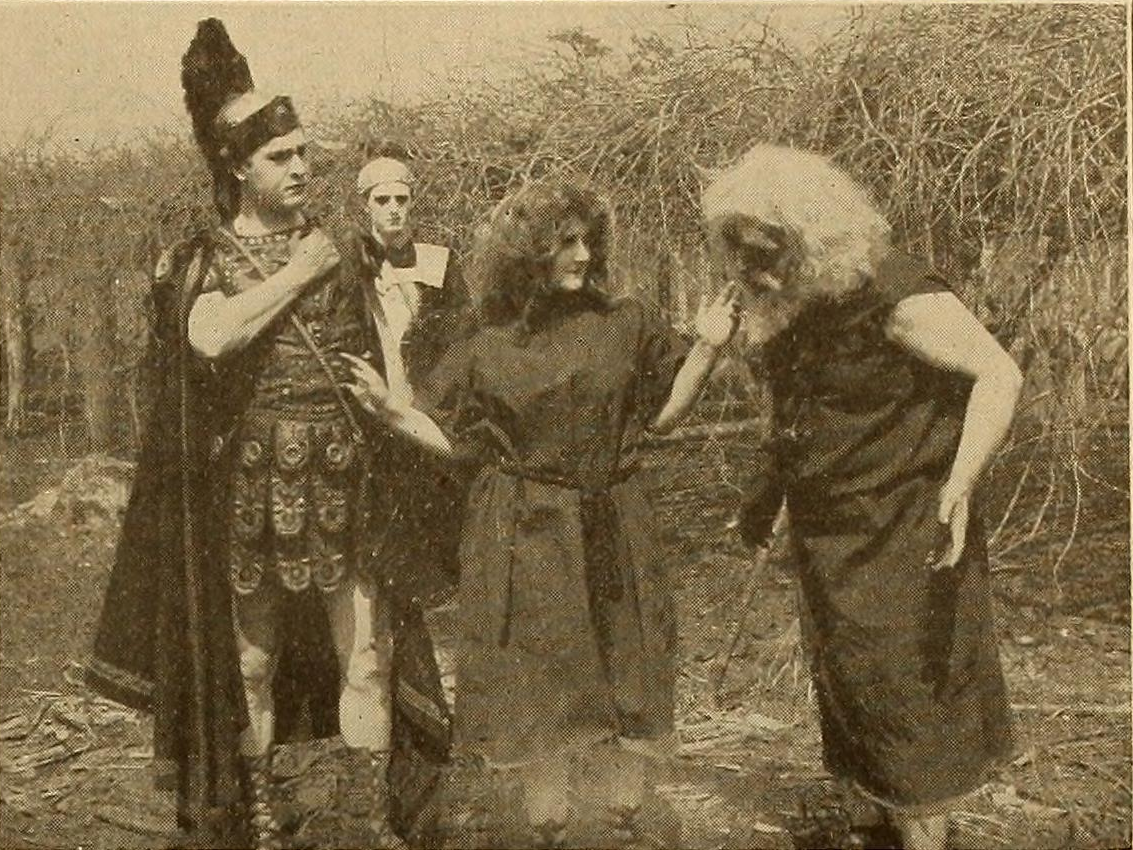
- Directed by: George W. Terwilliger
- Written by: George W. Terwilliger
- Starring: Earl Metcalfe; Ormi Hawley; Herbert Fortier
- Production company: Lubin Manufacturing Company
- Distributed by: Joseph W. Farnham (States rights)
- Release date: 1916
- Running time: 6 reels
- Country: United States
- Language: Silent (English intertitles)
- Budget: $17,500

Race Suicide is a 1916 American silent drama film written and directed by George W. Terwilliger for Lubin Manufacturing Company and released on a states rights basis by Joseph W. Farham. The film is split into five vignettes from four different time periods, starring the same actors in different roles.

Race Suicide takes its title directly from the eugenicist theory of the same name, which posited that "the white race" was not reproducing enough, and at risk being replaced by other, "lower races." Noted by reviewer Peter Milne, the film uses the term to portray abandonment, killing of a child, or loss of reproductive potential, rather than the popularly accepted definition.

== Cast ==
Prehistoric segment:

- Earl Metcalfe as The Man
- Ormi Hawley as The Woman
- Herbert Fortier as The Brute

Roman segment:

- Earl Metcalfe as The Roman
- Octavia Handworth as His Wife
- Ormi Hawley as The Girl
- Herbert Fortier as Her Father
- Kempton Greene as Her Sweetheart

Elizabethan segment:

- Ormi Hawley as Ormetta
- Earl Metcalfe as Emanuel Valdez
- Kempton Greene as Carlos
- Hazel Hubbard as Della de'Oro
- Herbert Fortier as Hernardo Mendez

Modern segment:

- Ormi Hawley as Elsie Long
- Earl Metcalfe as Chester Keeney

== Production ==
The film's opening scenes of animal life were directed by Raymond Ditmar of the New York Zoological Park, and interiors were filmed at Lubin Studios in Philadelphia under the working title "The Eternal Sacrifice." Additional filming locations included Florida and Newport, Rhode Island. Moving Picture World stated that in total, the film cost $17,500.

== Release ==
Distribution rights for Race Suicide were acquired by Joseph W. Farham, who then sold the territorial rights to regional distributors under the state rights system. Bids for American territorial rights reached more than $50,000 by January 1916.

Race Suicide was rejected twice by the Ohio State Board of Censors, but upon appeal, passed with several cuts.

== Preservation ==
A fragment of Race Suicide is held by the George Eastman House.
