= Kevin Nadal =

American writer

Kevin Nadal Ph.D.
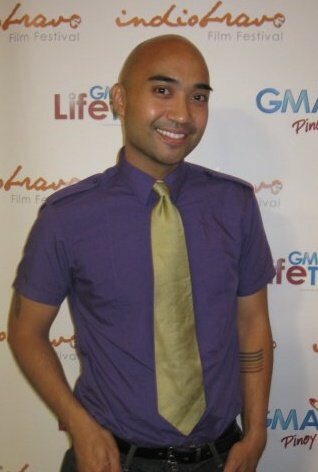
- Nadal at Filipino Film Festival
- Born: Kevin Leo Yabut Nadal

Academic background
- Education: Columbia University; Michigan State University; University of California, Irvine

Academic work
- Discipline: Psychology
- Institutions: John Jay College of Criminal Justice, Graduate Center, CUNY
- Website: http://www.kevinnadal.com

Kevin Leo Yabut Nadal is an author, activist, comedian, and Distinguished Professor of Psychology at John Jay College of Criminal Justice and The Graduate Center of the City University of New York. He is a researcher and expert on the effects of microaggressions on racial/ethnic minorities and LGBTQ people.

== Education & academic career ==
Nadal received Bachelor's degrees in psychology and political science from the University of California, Irvine, a Master's degree in counseling from Michigan State University, as well as a Ph.D. in counseling psychology from Columbia University.

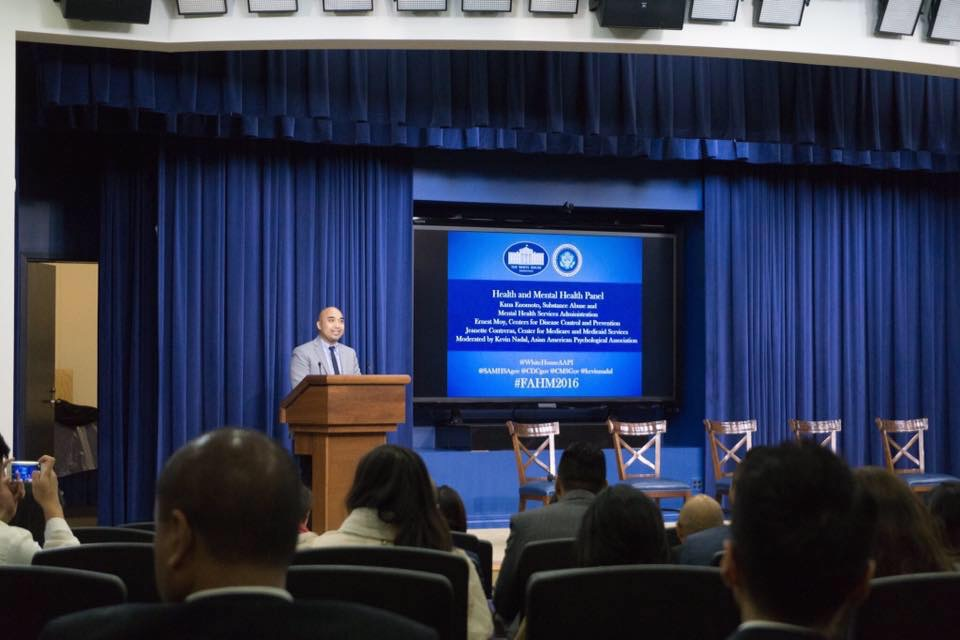
Dr. Kevin Nadal speaking at the White House Filipino American History Month Celebration in 2016

From 2014 to 2017, Nadal was appointed as the executive director of CLAGS: the Center for LGBTQ Studies (formerly known as Center for Lesbian and Gay Studies). In the organization, Nadal also co-founded the Division on Filipino Americans. Nadal is a national trustee of the Filipino American National Historical Society.

Nadal's book Filipino American Psychology: A Handbook of Theory, Research, and Clinical Practice (Wiley, 2011) was noted for being the first comprehensive book on Filipino American mental health issues. Nadal has gone on to release other books on this and related topics.

Nadal's research and writings concentrate on race, ethnicity, sexual orientation, gender, and the concept of racial microaggressions, and other microaggressions or subtle forms of discrimination towards racial/ethnic minorities, women, and LGBTQ populations. He created and published the Racial and Ethnic Microaggressions Scale in the Journal of Counseling Psychology in 2011. Nadal has also researched "sexual orientation microaggressions" In 2013, Nadal released That's So Gay!' Microaggressions and the Lesbian, Gay, Bisexual, and Transgender Community.

== Awards ==
- John Jay College Scholarly Excellence Award (2015)
- Outstanding Filipino Americans of New York (2015)
- APA Early Career Award for Distinguished Contributions to Psychology in the Public Interest (2017)
- Western Society of Criminology Richard Tewksbury Award (2019)
- Robert Wood Johnson Foundation Thought Leadership Award (2019)

== Personal life ==
Nadal was raised in Fremont, California. During his high school years, Nadal reports being bullied for being gay. Since 2010, he has become vocal about ending bullying in schools.

== Social justice advocacy ==
Nadal has written or spoken about the need for Filipino Americans to address colorism within their families and communities, the need for people to challenge homophobia and transphobia, the experiences of invisibility and marginalization of Filipino Americans and other "brown Asians" in the general Asian American community, the racial microaggressions LGBTQ people of color experience in dating and sexual relationships, the systemic colorblindness and marginalization of people of color in queer studies, as well as anti-black racism.

In 2007, Nadal gained attention with several media outlets when he started an online petition against ABC Studios for negative statements made about Philippine medical schools on the television show Desperate Housewives.

In 2014, Nadal formed the LGBTQ Scholars of Color National Network as a way to provide support for LGBTQ people of color in academia.

In 2016, Nadal and his colleagues wrote an open letter to the New York Times for their lack of Filipino American representation in a video segment that described Filipino American experiences.

Nadal was also very vocal about addressing racism and Islamophobia in response to the Pulse tragedy in Orlando.

In 2017, American Psychologist published Nadal's "Let's Get In Formation": On Becoming a Psychologist-Activist in the 21st Century, where he argued of the ethical responsibility for psychologists to "combat oppression on individual, interpersonal, group, and institutional levels."

== See also ==
- Filipinos in the New York metropolitan area
- LGBT culture in New York City
- List of LGBT people from New York City
- NYC Pride March
