= Cornelia Chase Brant =

American physician (1863–1959)

Doctor Cornelia Chase Brant

Dean of New York Medical College and Hospital for Women
- In office 1914–1918

President of Brooklyn Woman's Club

Personal details
- Born: Cornelia Lucretia Chase; December 16, 1863 Ottawa, Illinois, US
- Died: March 9, 1959 (aged 95) Bronxville, New York, US
- Resting place: Woodlawn Cemetery
- Spouse: Henry Livingston Brant
- Education: New York Medical College and Hospital for Women
- Occupation: Mother; Physician

Cornelia Lucretia Brant (née Chase; December 16, 1863 – March 9, 1959) was an American medical doctor.

After starting a family, she started a medical career as a mature student, graduating from the New York Medical College and Hospital for Women in 1903. She assumed the position of Dean in 1914, served as part of the Council of National Defense during the First World War, and then practiced as a GP in Brooklyn from 1918 to 1939. She was an active club woman and was the president of the Brooklyn Woman's Club.

== Early life ==
She was born Cornelia "Nellie" Lucretia Chase to a Quaker family in Ottawa, Illinois on December 16, 1863. Her mother died in childbirth when she was nine and she was then brought up by three aunts in Newark, New Jersey. They ran a school for young ladies with a liberal philosophy, being friends with Susan B. Anthony and Dr Clemence Lozier, who were pioneers of women's rights. The latter had established the New York Medical College and Hospital for Women in 1863, pioneering medical education for women. This acquaintance and the male medical establishment's failure to care for women in her life established a desire to become a doctor in the young woman.

To prepare for a medical career, she went to the Packer Collegiate Institute in Brooklyn in 1881 for its junior college program. But "she had a beau" – lawyer Henry Livingston Brant – and married him on November 26, 1885 in Newark, and then focussed on bringing up her family of three children: Clifford, Hazel and Helen. Henry Brant was the heir to his father's lumber business but studied law at Princeton and then started a successful legal career, with an office on Park Row for over fifty years.

== Medical career ==
In 1898, when her youngest child was seven, she persuaded her husband to allow her to start medical training. She commuted on the el train to the New York Medical College and Hospital for Women where she studied hard, graduating first in her class in 1903 with honors.

After graduating, she studied electrotherapeutics and light therapy for three years. She later specialized in physical therapy and was the president of the National Society of Therapeutics.

She became Dean of the New York Medical College and Hospital for Women in 1914. In 1915, as head of the college, she was asked to comment on the controversial Baby Bollinger case. She spoke against the eugenic ideas of Dr Haiselden, "In my opinion it is impossible for any physician to say absolutely that any human condition is beyond cure or at least improvement. It is the doctor's duty to preserve life to the last possible moment."

She joined the Cumberland Hospital in 1916 with two other women – the first women to be appointed to the staff of a public hospital in the city.

In 1917, she served on the American Women's Hospitals subcommittee of the General Medical Board of the Council of National Defense, for the purpose of mobilizing women for medical service and establishing all-women hospitals overseas.

After the First World War, she continued as a general practitioner in Brooklyn until 1939.

== Personal life and death ==
She was active in the woman's club movement and was the president of both the Brooklyn Woman's Club and the Brooklyn Colony of the National Society of New England Women.

She travelled abroad every summer, visiting most countries in the world except China and India. In 1935, she spent three months in South Africa with her husband and members of the Sarasota Woman's Club. She visited Sarasota in 1936 to give an illustrated lecture to the club about the expedition.

A 309 page biography of her life, Dream Within Her Hand, was published in 1940. It was written by her daughter, Helen, with classmate and author Alice Ross Colver, who wrote over sixty other books.

Her husband Henry died in 1945 and she herself died at their home in Bronxville in 1959. She was survived by her two daughters, seven grandchildren and sixteen great-grandchildren.
