= Race suicide =

Alarmist term used in eugenics

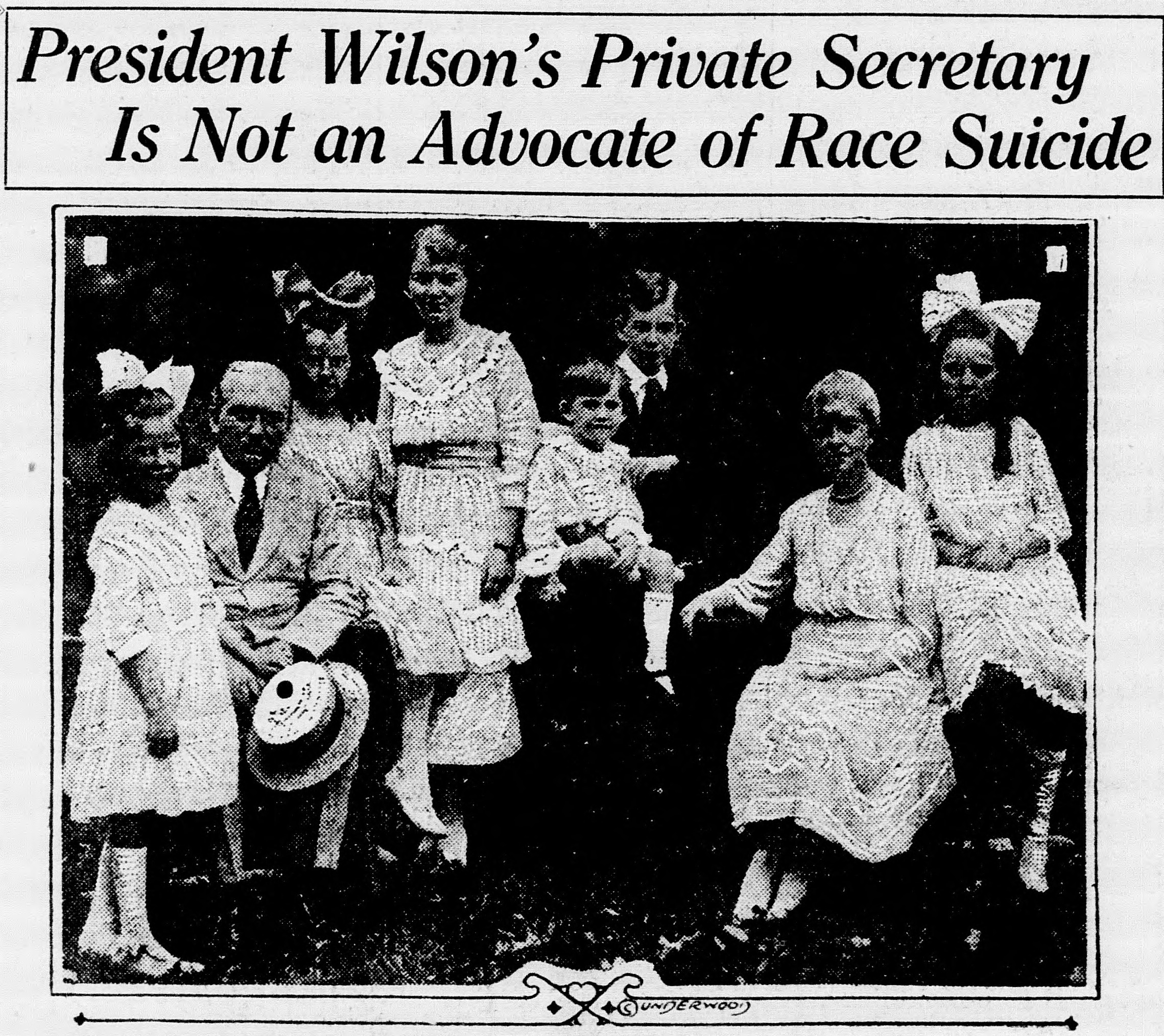
A newspaper photograph from 1919 of Joseph Patrick Tumulty with his wife and six children, under the headline "President Wilson's Private Secretary Is Not an Advocate of Race Suicide"

Race suicide was an alarmist eugenicist theory, coined by American sociologist Edward A. Ross around 1900 and promoted by, among others, Harry J. Haiselden. According to the American Eugenics Archive, "race suicide" conceptualizes a hypothetical situation in which the death rate of a particular "race" supersedes its birth rate.

As a propagandistic theory akin to white genocide, race suicide was mechanized to induce fear in dominant and/or majority "races" (i.e. the "white race") that their community was dying off and being replaced by more fertile immigrant "races". This term was likewise deployed to proliferate the ideology of eugenics among the international public throughout the 20th century. Moreover, the concept of "race suicide" predominantly placed blame on women, as supposed agents of reproduction. With its roots in Nordicism, the application of this alarmist theory varied based on the targeted community and/or country.

== Eugenics ==
The theory of race suicide is fundamentally rooted in and influenced by the internationally popularized and pseudoscientific theory of eugenics, which advocates for the universal improvement of the human gene pool through the elimination of certain "races" deemed "unfit" for reproduction. In the United States, "unfit" races have historically included minorities such as immigrants and African Americans, people with mental and physical disabilities, people in poverty, institutionalized people, and/or people convicted of crimes. Eugenics sought to eliminate these people, such that their "undesirable traits and behaviors" would be effectively weeded out of the human population over time.

Race suicide rhetoric induced fear in dominant groups and institutions by eliciting eugenics and suggesting that these "undesirable" and "unfit" racial groups were proliferating, while the "desirable" and "fit" racial groups were essentially "killing themselves" by failing to sufficiently reproduce. As a result of fear-mongering, race suicide theorists in the 20th century turned to socio-political institutions, pseudoscientific propaganda, and social policy. They believed that such policies would supposedly prevent race suicide before the "unfit" racial groups replaced the "fit" ones. In doing so, they gave rise the theory of eugenics.

In this age of international eugenic propaganda, "Race suicide theorists believed that natural evolutionary dynamics were disrupted in the age of industry, and that social policy was needed to ensure that the supposedly superior 'races' did not disappear." This propaganda ran throughout newspapers and educational spaces. This eugenic propaganda also contributed to conversations pertaining to forced sterilization of the "unfit", "hypersexual", and those with "hereditary defectiveness". For example, S. Fred Hogue first released his weekly pro-eugenics column in the Los Angeles Times Sunday Magazine in 1935. In one column entitled "Shall We Halt Race Suicide", he wrote: "It is self-evident that if the unfit are to be permitted to reproduce at the present alarming rate, they will wreck civilization ... To prevent this form of race suicide, it is absolutely essential that the unfit shall not be permitted to continue to reproduce their kind."

== Racialized women ==
=== Hypersexualization of women of color ===
The first element to disentangling "race suicide" and the racialization of women of color is hypersexualization. Hypersexualization is an objectifying portrayal of people, most often women, usually of color, as excessively sexual. The objectification was instrumental in perpetuating concerns of race suicide because many people assumed women of color were reproducing at higher rates and seducing white men, therefore reducing the white race's size – a pseudoscientific "fact" with no basis in truth.

==== Immigration ====
The hypersexualization of women of color was not only socially perpetuated but was systemically ingrained into U.S. institutions. For instance, the first immigration legislation that set the parameters for who could enter the country was the Page Act of 1875. This law barred Chinese women from migrating to the U.S. out of fear that they were immoral and diseased prostitutes. The 1924 Johnson-Reed Act, which was passed partly to "combat the specter race suicide", brought this to an extreme by banning all immigrants from Asia. More broadly, the Act engaged in a racialized operation of tightening the borders by setting national quotas for immigrants. This "hardened anti-Black racism and turned Asians and Latino/as into immutable others". To help pass such laws, influential scientific figures like Harry H. Laughlin testified before Congress, warning of a race suicide if such dynamics, partly based on an assumption of hypersexuality, prevailed and immigration law failed to be strong enough.

==== Incarceration ====
Incarceration institutions perpetuated ideas of hypersexuality. Jails imprisoned women for deviating from norms of sexuality. Black people, especially during the Jim Crow era, were sent to prisons at disproportionate rates. When these women of color were incarcerated, they were not sent to reformatories like white women, but rather, they resided in custodial prisons like men.

===== Legal and cultural influence =====
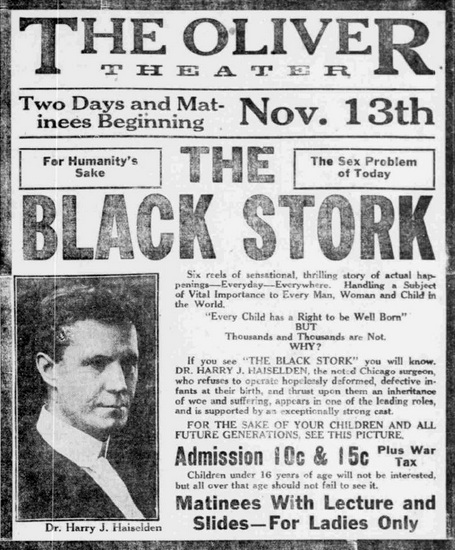
A promotional flyer for The Black Stork

Case law provides additional evidence for hypersexual racialization and race suicide anxieties. Rhinelander v. Rhinelander (1925), for instance, painted a Black woman as a hypersexual "vamp" who took advantage of her white husband. The white man, Leo Rhinelander, claimed that his wife lied about her ancestry. The trial lawyers portrayed Alice Jones as a "sexually aggressive woman who seduced the younger Leo Rhinelander". This is the image of a "vamp", which is a woman who seduces men, most often applied specifically to women of color. The case echoed societal fears of race corruption, specifically that white men's relations with hypersexual black women could inevitably contribute to "'race suicide' or the demise of the white race". On the cultural side, films like The Black Stork crafted images of seductive enslaved women, while the Dragon Lady and Lotus Blossom cinematic stereotypes villainized Asian American women as temptresses. Institutional and cultural mechanisms in the U.S. worked in tandem to promote the image of women of color as hypersexualized and thus threatening to the survival of the white race.

=== Hysteria ===
A common diagnosis in the earlier twentieth century dubbed "hysteria" also played a role in the racialization of women and, in turn, racial suicide fears. Hysteria was an illness apparently plaguing white, upper-class women. The sickness purportedly caused (white) women to be frail, weak, and not reproduce, which endangered the longevity of the white race.

Hysteria played into racializing dynamics largely because the chief cause was the "overcivilization" of white women, which was put in a binary opposition to hardy "savages" – a category for women of color. Examples of this dynamic are evident in the American Journal of Obstetrics during the 1880s. For instance, George J. Engelmann published several articles that concluded these "primitive" (Black, Mexican, Native American, Asian American, poor Appalachian white) and "savage" women experienced labor as "short and easy", compared to overcivilized white women. Joseph Johnson gathered similar observations, specifically on enslaved women, noting that there were "surprisingly few preternatural or instrumental cases [forceps deliveries] among them". Doctor Lucien Warner explicitly tied race and gender when he explicated that Black women and other immigrants were robust workers who had "comparative immunity from uterine disease" relative to white women. Overall, George Beard best summarized these dynamics in 1881 when explicitly surmised, "nervous disease scarcely exists among savages or barbarians, or semi-barbarians or partially civilized people".

The categorization and diagnosis of hysteria were founded in societal and "scientific" ideas that women of color, savage women, were robust, strong, fertile, and threatening – partly related to their hypersexuality, as many evolutionary theories pointed to hypersexuality as a sign of being uncivilized, and partly related to their innate "savagery". Upper-class white women were weak, fragile, nervous, and infertile. These dynamics, where women of color were fertile and birthing while hysterical white women were not, inevitably exacerbated race suicide concerns.

== Language and political implications ==
=== Race suicide rhetoric in the U.S. ===
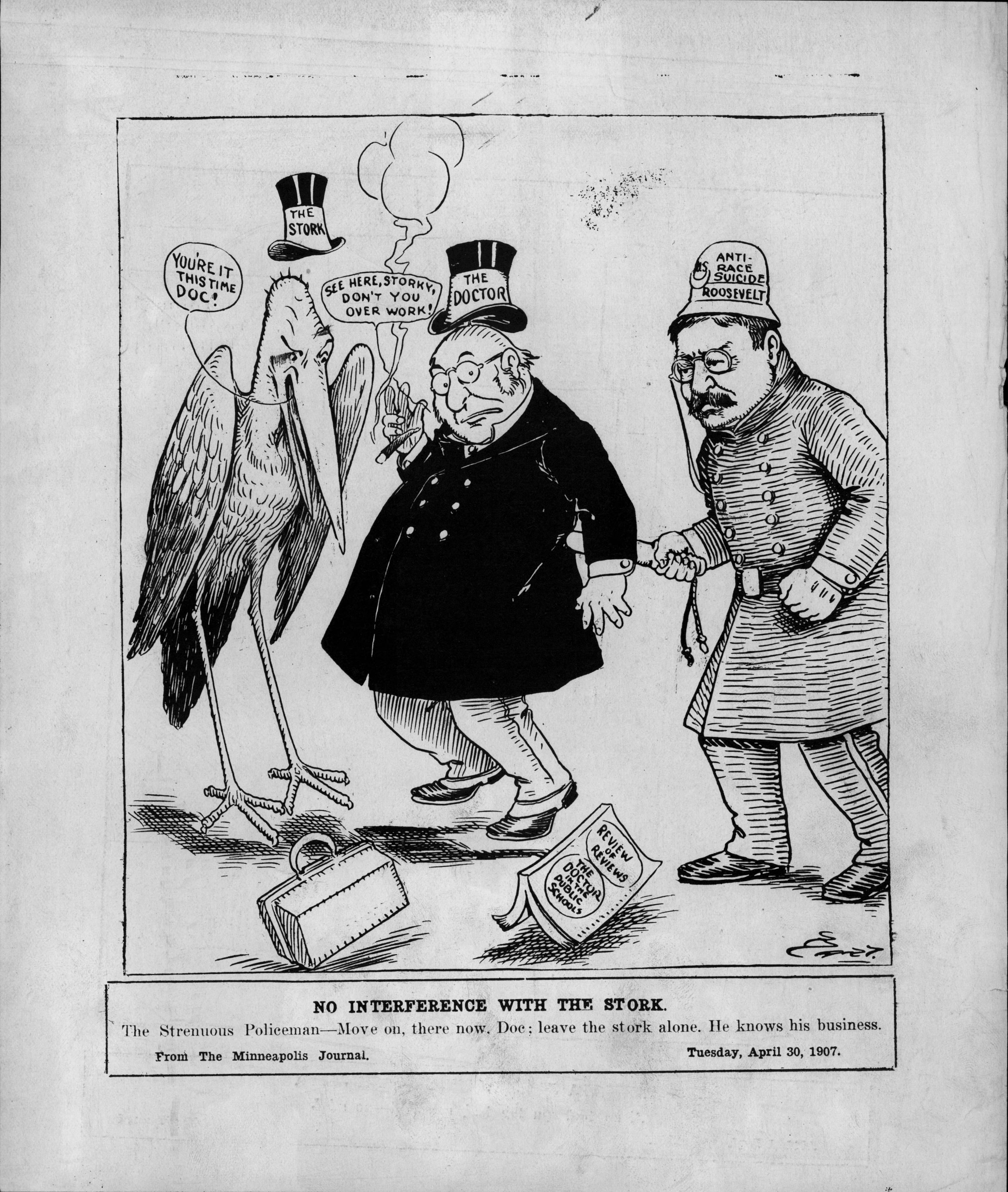
1907 cartoon of Theodore Roosevelt

Early race suicide rhetoric in the United States suggested a differential birth rate between native-born Protestant and immigrant Catholic women, or more generally between the "fit" (white, wealthy, educated Protestants) and the "unfit" (poor, uneducated, criminals, diseased, disabled, minorities). Fear-mongering tactics relied on the idea that the "fit" group would ultimately dwindle to the point of extinction if they did not adopt an urgency to reproduce. This rhetoric was later extended to further entrench the eugenic claim that African Americans and other immigrants "races" with growing populations were "unfit," "hypersexual," and "dangerous."

In 1902, Theodore Roosevelt, the President of the United States, called race suicide "fundamentally infinitely more important than any other question in this country," arguing to the American public that "the man or woman who deliberately avoids marriage, and has a heart so cold as to know no passion and a brain so shallow and selfish as to dislike having children, is in effect a criminal against the race, and should be an object of contemptuous abhorrence by all healthy people." Likewise, in 1905, he argued that a man or woman who is childless by choice "merits contempt."

This 1908 book by Alice Freeman Lusk challenged and pushed back against Theodore Roosevelt and society's traditional gender roles for women.

This political agenda further targeted women and criticized them for choosing not to fulfill their "duty" of getting married and having children and thus maintaining the White population. In contrast, the growing non-White population was overly exaggerated in order to frame the situation as an alarming matter. Many newspaper articles claimed that this great increase was a threat that these non-White groups would have greater participation and more of an influence in politics in the future. In contrast, women who left a "legacy" after their death by having numerous children, and subsequently, grandchildren and great-grandchildren, were openly praised for helping to "fight against" the idea of race suicide.

==== Media and culture ====
As the teddy bear, which was named after Theodore Roosevelt, increased in popularity, some individuals were worried that young girls who did not play with dolls as often would lose their "motherly instincts". Criticism of the teddy bear was another form of fear mongering, as these people claimed it contributed to the concept of race suicide.

In response to Theodore Roosevelt's public warning against the idea of race suicide, some individuals also extended this concept, suggesting restrictions not only on non-White races, but also to individuals in lower economic classes due to "economic and educational reasons". It was no longer only political figures, but also ministers, educators, and other individuals in leadership positions who were pushing for legislation to encourage White Americans to marry and have children. For example, Alexander Graham Bell publicly expressed his support for this agenda.

L. Frank Baum mocked the concept of race suicide in his 1907 Father Goose's Year Book in a poem about horse racing.

The 1938 movie "Race Suicide" criticized women who chose not to get married or have children, with the line "Are Modern Women Cheaters?" standing out in its movie poster.

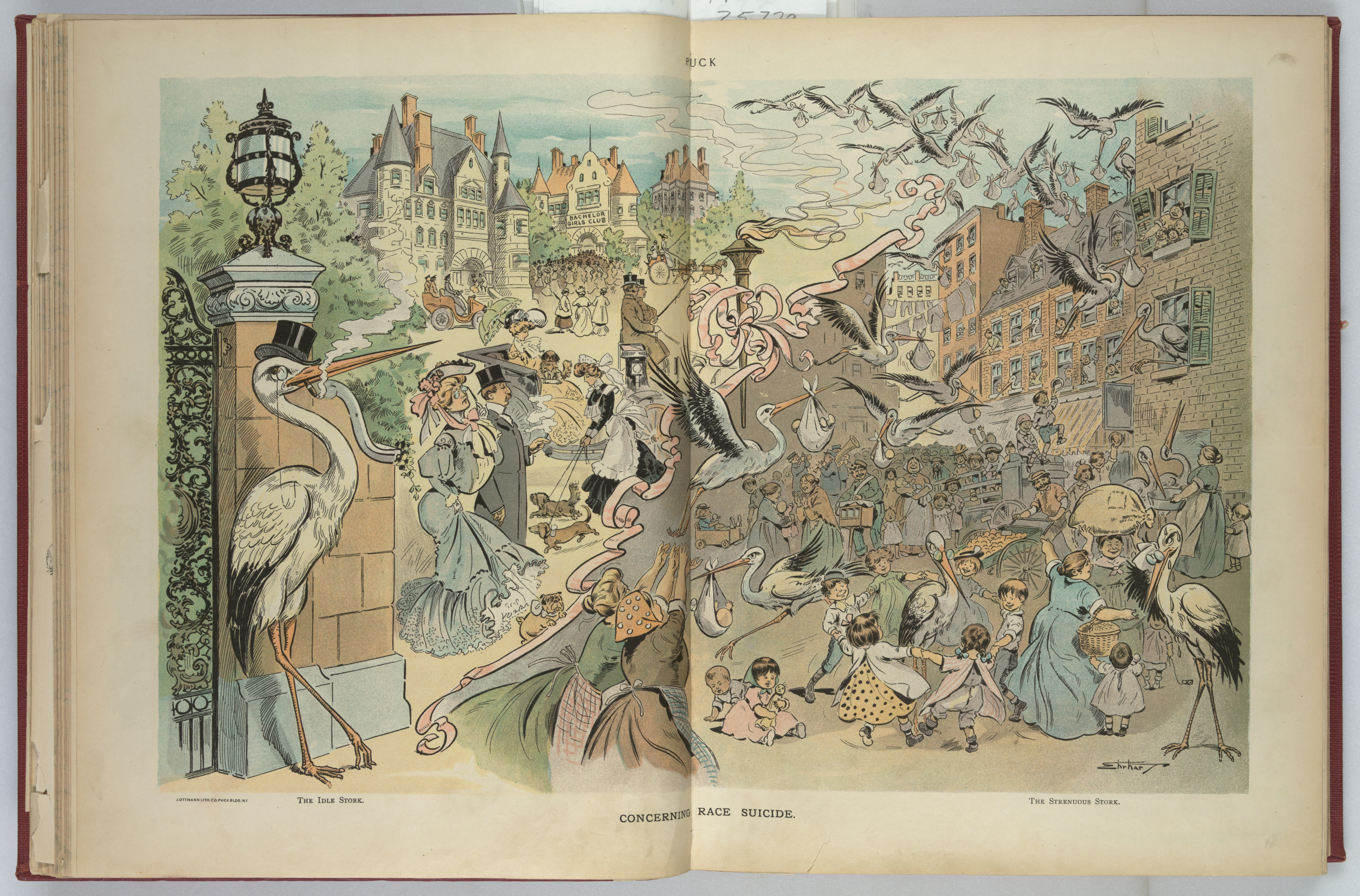
An illustration by Ehrhart showing storks contributing to or working against race suicide (1903).

Many propaganda images were also created and distributed through avenues, such as newspapers. A popular symbol that was used was the stork, a bird often associated with the idea of "bringing babies". One example is an illustration from 1903 created by Samuel D. Ehrhart, which is displayed to the right. It depicted an "idle" stork of the upper class not fulfilling its duty, while the "strenuous" stork of the lower class was constantly working and increasing that population.

=== Race suicide rhetoric in Canada ===
Similarly in Canada, W. Stewart Wallace, the author of "The Canadian Immigration Policy," endorsed the idea of race suicide. "The Canadian Immigration Policy" cited the native-born population's "struggle to keep up appearances in the face of the increasing competition" as a purported cause of its low birth rate. Wallace claimed that immigrants did not increase a nation's population but merely replaced it.

== See also ==
- Great Replacement conspiracy theory, a later theory with similar themes
- Natalism, promoting higher fertility rates
