= Matt Brim =

American queer studies professor

Academic background
- Education: Wabash College (BA); Indiana University Bloomington (PhD)

Academic work
- Discipline: Queer studies
- Institutions: College of Staten Island; CUNY Graduate Center

Matt Brim is an American queer studies professor serving as the executive director of CLAGS: The Center for LGBTQ Studies at the CUNY Graduate Center since 2023. He is a professor in the English department at College of Staten Island.

== Life ==
Brim earned a B.A. from Wabash College. He completed a Ph.D. at Indiana University Bloomington.

Brim teaches courses in LGBT literature, women's studies, queer studies, and feminism. He is a queer studies professor in the English department at the College of Staten Island. In 2023, he became the executive director of CLAGS: The Center for LGBTQ Studies at the CUNY Graduate Center.

== Selected works ==
- Brim, Matt (2014). James Baldwin and the Queer Imagination. University of Michigan Press. ISBN 978-0-472-07234-7.
- Ghaziani, Amin; Brim, Matt, eds. (2019). Imagining Queer Methods. NYU Press. ISBN 978-1-4798-2102-0.
- Brim, Matt (2020). Poor Queer Studies: Confronting Elitism in the University. Duke University Press. ISBN 978-1-4780-0682-4.
- Mahn, Churnjeet; Brim, Matt; Taylor, Yvette, eds. (2022). Queer Sharing in the Marketized University. Routledge. ISBN 978-1-032-06658-5.
- Taylor, Yvette; Brim, Matt; Mahn, Churnjeet, eds. (2023). Queer Precarities in and Out of Higher Education: Challenging Institutional Structures. Bloomsbury Academic. ISBN 978-1-350-27365-8.
