= Cumberland Hospital (Brooklyn) =

Defunct hospital in Brooklyn, New York City

Geography
- Location: Fort Greene, Brooklyn, New York, United States
- Coordinates: 40°41′47″N 73°58′28″W

Services
- Beds: 366

History
- Opened: 1873
- Closed: 1983

Links
- Lists: Hospitals in New York State
- Other links: List of hospitals in Brooklyn

Cumberland Hospital was a 366-bed municipal hospital located in Fort Greene, Brooklyn.

== History ==
They opened as Brooklyn Homeopathic Hospital at 109 Cumberland Street on February 13, 1873, and was rebuilt in 1918. The new facility was renamed Cumberland Hospital in 1922. Later locations for Cumberland include 35 (1953) and then 39 (1962) Auburn Place. Subsequent to closing as a hospital on August 24, 1983, it became an outpatient clinic called Neighborhood Family Care Center. The day after their 1983 closing the city began a free shuttle bus service from Cumberland to Woodhull Hospital, then-described as "one of the most modern and expensive hospitals in the world." They have since renamed it to the Cumberland Diagnostic Treatment Center, located at 100 North Portland Avenue, serving as one of the clinics that are part of Brooklyn Hospital Center, with which they already had an affiliation.

In 1916, Cornelia Chase Brant became one of the first women to be appointed to the staff of a public hospital in New York City when she assumed a position at Cumberland.

== Notable births ==
- Michael Jordan (born 1963), professional basketball player.
- Mike Tyson (born 1966), professional boxer.
- The Notorious B.I.G. (born 1972), rapper.
