= Gay American History =

Non-fiction book about the gay community in the United States

Gay American History: Lesbians and Gay Men in the U.S.A.
- Cover of the book
- Author: Jonathan Ned Katz
- Language: English
- Publisher: Thomas Y. Crowell Company
- Publication date: 1976
- Pages: 1063
- ISBN: 0-380-40550-4

Gay American History: Lesbians and Gay Men in the U.S.A. is a book by Jonathan Ned Katz. It is a study of the history of the gay community in the United States. The book is considered a revolutionary work chronicling the history of LGBT people.

Published to coincide with the bicentennial of the United States, the book spotlights historical events from the 1500s through the 1970s, in the form of many historical documents. Topics covered range from resistance to treatment and troubles of gay men and lesbians in the United States. This includes information about homosexuality within Native American communities and among the European colonists.

== Recognition ==
The book has been considered one of the top lesbian and gay nonfiction books. It is widely cited as a foundational work in LGBT history.
