= Carroll Smith-Rosenberg =

American academic and author

Carroll Smith-Rosenberg is an American academic and author who is the Mary Frances Berry Collegiate Professor of History, American Culture, and Women's Studies, emerita, at the University of Michigan, Ann Arbor.

Smith-Rosenberg is known for her scholarship in U.S. women's and gender history, and for her contributions to developing interdisciplinary programs and international scholarly networks addressing women's history, gender studies, the history of sexuality, and cultural and Atlantic studies.

Smith-Rosenberg's article, "The Female World of Love and Ritual", has been described as creating "a template for how feminists could literally make history" (Potter, 2015). Her article "Discovering the Subject of the Great Constitutional Debate", was awarded the Binkley-Stephenson Award by the Organization of American Historians in 1993. Smith-Rosenberg's book, This Violent Empire: The Birth of an American National Identity, won a Choice Award for Distinguished Scholarly Book in 2011.

== Early life and education ==
Smith-Rosenberg was born in Yonkers, New York, March 15, 1936, to Carroll Smith and Angela Haug Smith. She grew up near Yankee Stadium, in the Bronx. Her heritage included a Caribbean grandfather, two centuries of slave-holding ancestors, and "on both sides, Irish grandmothers who didn't speak to one another" (Smith-Rosenberg, 2007).

Smith-Rosenberg obtained a BA from the Connecticut College for Women (1957) and her MA (1958) and PhD (1968) from Columbia University, where she worked with Richard Hofstadter and Robert Cross (Smith-Rosenberg, 1971). From 1972 to 1975 Smith-Rosenberg held a post-doctoral fellowship in psychiatry at the medical school of the University of Pennsylvania, where she also taught.

== Scholarship ==
=== Early scholarship ===
Smith-Rosenberg has described her scholarly career trajectory as "built around forty years of university teaching, scholarly friends around the world, and ... an increasingly progressive political vision" (Smith-Rosenberg, 2007). She said that the political feminism of the 1960s led her to reshape the questions she asked and to push the boundaries of both the methods and the conceptual frameworks of traditional history (Smith-Rosenberg, 1985, p. 11).

Smith-Rosenberg's principal goal was:

to so redefine the canons of traditional history that the events and processes central to women's experience assume historic centrality, and women are recognized as active agents of social change. (DuBois et al., 1980, pp. 56–57)

According to Smith-Rosenberg, her early scholarship focused on problems of urban poverty in Victorian America and the ways in which an emerging bourgeois elite attempted to understand and contain them (Smith-Rosenberg, 1985, p. 20).

Smith-Rosenberg's first book, Religion and the Rise of the American City, was published in 1971. The book contained a study of the American Female Moral Reform Society, which she termed a "uniquely female institution" (Smith-Rosenberg, 1985, p. 11), During her research, Smith-Rosenberg, said that she discovered a passionate 40-year correspondence between two women. Suddenly, Smith-Rosenberg has recalled, "everywhere I looked, the private papers of ordinary women beckoned" (Smith-Rosenberg, 1985, p. 27).

=== "The Female World of Love and Ritual" ===
In 1975 Smith-Rosenberg published the article, "The Female World of Love and Ritual: Relations between Women in Nineteenth-Century America". It was presented at the second Berkshire Conference on the History of Women (Melosh, 1990), and published as the lead article in the first-ever issue of Signs: Journal of Women in Culture and Society (1975).

- Barbara Melosh called the article one of the most frequently cited in the scholarship on women's history and one of the first and most influential explorations of the history of lesbianism, notable for placing female sexuality within the larger context of gender construction (Melosh, 1990).
- According to Linda Kerber, the separation of gender roles between women and men and resultant sexual patterns had been previously described only in terms of subordination and victimization. Smith-Rosenberg's article, however, "offered a striking reinterpretation of the possibilities of separation" (Kerber, 1997, p. 166)
- As historian Claire Bond Potter pointed out to the Organization of American Historians (2015), "when feminist scholarship began to move definitively away from a movement context and women's history became a multi-generational project, this article traveled in a way that few have" (see also Rupp, 2000).

=== Other publications ===
Smith-Rosenberg went on to publish numerous articles addressing sexuality and gender relations in nineteenth-century America, many of which were collected in her second book, Disorderly Conduct: Visions of Gender in Victorian America (1985).

Discussing the collection in The New York Times Book Review, Elizabeth Janeway (1985) wrote that "few historians have used the stream of myth and history so productively"; the book, she noted, "suggests a restructuring of the way we see history by presenting the reactions of men and women to the shock of industrial upheaval, and the interplay between their variant visions".

=== New Family planning group ===
In the 1980s Smith-Rosenberg was one of the principal organizers of the New Family and New Woman Research Planning Group. The group brought together feminist scholars from the U.S., the United Kingdom, France, Germany, the Netherlands and Italy.

The planning group "believed we had a historical mandate to identify new domains, create new institutions, or try to carve out places for ourselves in areas that had previously excluded, devalued, and ignored us" (Friedlander et al., 1986). The group's activities resulted in the volume, Women in Culture and Politics: A Century of Change (1986), edited by Judith Friedlander, Blanche Wiesen Cook, Alice Kessler-Harris, and Smith-Rosenberg.

=== This Violent Empire ===
In 2010, Smith-Rosenberg published This Violent Empire: The Birth of an American National Identity.

- The book explores the question, "Why did a nation of immigrants, a people who see themselves as a model for democracies around the world, embrace a culture of violence?" Smith-Rosenberg traces this culture of violence "to the very processes by which the founding generation struggled to create a coherent national identity in the face of deep-seated ethnic, racial, religious, and regional divisions" (Common-Place, 2011).
- in the book, Smith-Rosenberg argues that America's founders consolidated a national sense of self by describing a series of "Others", including African Americans, Native Americans, women, and those without property, whose differences from the country's founders overshadowed the differences that divided the founders themselves. The result, she argues, is an American national identity subject to xenophobia, racism and paranoia (Smith-Rosenberg, 2011).
- Reviewers have noted that, although its focus is on early U.S. history, the book speaks powerfully to U.S. political and cultural issues in a post-9/11 world (see, for example, Hansen, 2011; Jeffers, 2011).

Her latest book project both continues Smith-Rosenberg's interest in American "Others" and reaches back to her own Caribbean heritage. The project explores the concept of modern citizenship as emerging from intense interactions among four violent events in the Atlantic world: the U.S., French, Haitian and Irish revolutions. It

focuses on the complex triangulation of race, slavery, and gender, using them to examine the contradictions and ambivalence lying at the heart of both citizenship and, most especially, of liberal political thought. (Aspen Institute, n.d.)

== Teaching ==
Smith-Rosenberg began her teaching career at the University of Pennsylvania in the 1960s when few women found positions in Ivy League institutions, teaching initially as an adjunct in the School of General Studies. In 1972 she became an assistant professor in both the psychiatry and the history departments of the university. At Penn she founded and served as an early director of the university's Women's Studies Program (1982–1995).

From 1996 until her retirement in 2008 Smith-Rosenberg taught at the University of Michigan, Ann Arbor, where she is the Mary Frances Berry Collegiate Professor of History, American Culture, and Women's Studies (emerita). At Michigan, she served as graduate chair of the American Culture Program and director of the Atlantic Studies Initiative, which she helped establish. She has also been a visiting scholar at academic institutions, including Columbia University, New York University, the City University of New York Graduate Center, and the Ecole des Hautes Etudes des Sciences Sociales, Paris.

== Major publications ==
- "Bodies". In Catharine R. Stimpson & Gilbert Herdt (Eds.), Critical Terms for the Study of Gender, 21 – 40. Chicago: The University of Chicago Press, 2014.
- This Violent Empire: The Birth of an American National Identity. Williamsburg, VA: Omahonda Institute of Early American History and Culture, University of North Carolina Press, 2010.
- Surrogate Americans: Masculinity, Masquerade, and the Formation of a National Identity. PMLA: Publications of the Modern Language Association of America 119 No. 5 (October 2004).
- "Black gothic: Race, gender and the construction of the American middle class". In Robert St. George (Ed.), Possible Pasts: Becoming Colonial in Early America, 243 – 269. Ithaca: Cornell University Press, 2000.
- "Political camp or the ambiguous engendering of the American Republic". In Catherine Hall, Ida Bloom & Karen Hagermann (Eds.), Gendered Nations: Nationalisms and Gender Order in the Long Nineteenth Century, 271–292. New York: Bloomsbury Academic Press, 2000.
- "Captive colonizers: Ambivalence and an emerging 'American identity'". In Catherine Hall (Ed.), Gender and History: Special issue on gender, nationalism and national identity, 177 – 195. Gender and History 5 (Summer 1993).
- "Dis-Covering the subject of the 'Great Constitutional Discussion'". Journal of American History 79 No. 3 (December 1992), 841–873.
- "Discourses of sexuality and subjectivity: The New Woman, 1870 – 1936". In Martin Duberman, Martha Vicinus, & George Chauncey, Jr. (Eds.), Hidden from History: Reclaiming the Gay & Lesbian Past, 264–280. New York: New American Library, 1989.
- "The body politic". In Elizabeth Weed (Ed.), Coming to Terms: Feminism, Theory, Politics, 101–121. New York and London: Routledge, 1989.
- "Domesticating virtue: Rebels and coquettes in young America". In Elaine Scarry (Ed.), Literature and the Body, 160–184. Baltimore: Johns Hopkins University Press, 1988.
- Judith Friedlander, Blanche Wiesen Cook, Alice Kessler-Harris, & Carroll Smith-Rosenberg (Eds.) Women in Culture and Politics: A Century of Change. Bloomington, IN: Indiana University Press, 1986.
- Disorderly Conduct: Visions of Gender in Victorian America. New York: Oxford University Press, 1985.
- Ellen DuBois, MariJo Buhle, Temma Kaplan, Gerda Lerner & Carroll-Smith Rosenberg, "Politics and culture in women's history: A symposium". Feminist Studies 6, no. 1 (Spring 1980), 56–57.
- "The female world of love and ritual". Signs: Journal of Women in Culture and Society 1, no. 1, 1975, 1–30.
- Religion and the Rise of the American City: The New York City Mission Movement 1812 – 1870. Ithaca, NY: Cornell University Press, 1971.
- "Beauty, the beast, and the militant woman". American Quarterly 23 (1971),

== Academic appointments ==
- University of Michigan, Mary Frances Berry Collegiate Professor of History, American Culture and Women's Studies (emerita)
- University of Cagliari, Italy, visiting professor, 2011; 2015.
- Columbia University, Institute of African Studies, visiting professor, 2013
- New York University, visiting professor, fall 2010
- Graduate Center, City University of New York, visiting professor, 2006–2010
- Director, Atlantic Studies Initiative, University of Michigan, 1999, 2006, 2007–2008
- Graduate Chair, American Culture Program, University of Michigan, 1997–2002, 2006
- Ecole des Hautes Etudes en Sciences Sociales, Paris, visiting professor, winter 2004
- University of Pennsylvania, Department of History and Psychiatry Department, 1971–1995
- Trustees' Council of Penn Women, professor in the humanities, University of Pennsylvania, 1985–1995
- Director, Women's Studies Program, University of Pennsylvania, 1982–1995
- University of Canterbury, New Zealand, visiting professor, 1989
- Free University of Berlin, visiting professor, 1979 – 1980

== Research fellowships ==
- Michigan Humanities Fellowship, University of Michigan, 2000
- Distinguished Visiting Scholar, Center for the Study of Ideas and Society, University of California, Riverside, 1998
- Fellow, Rockefeller Conference Center, Bellagio, Italy, 1993
- Guggenheim Foundation Fellow, 1990–1991
- American Council of Learned Societies, research fellowship, 1989
- Fellow, Institute of Advanced Studies, Princeton, 1987–1988
- Rockefeller Foundation, research fellowship, 1981
- American Council of Learned Societies, research fellowship, 1981
- American Antiquarian Society, research fellow, 1976–1977
- National Endowment for the Humanities (international conference director), 1975–1977
- Radcliff Institute, Harvard University, research fellow, 1975–1976
- Ford Foundation, research fellow, 1975–1976
- National Institute of Child Health and Human Development, psychiatry fellow, 1972–1975
- The Grant Foundation, research fellowship, 1970–1972
- National Institute of Mental Health, research grant, 1969–1970
- Social Science Research Council, pre-doctoral research training fellowship, 1961–1962

== Awards and prizes ==
- Top 25 Academic Books Award for This Violent Empire, 2011
- John D'Arms Faculty Award for Distinguished Graduate Mentoring in the Humanities, University of Michigan, 2003
- The R. Jean Brownlee Award, for Distinguished Service, University of Pennsylvania, 2003
- Organization of American Historians Binkley-Stephenson Award for "Dis-Covering the Subject of the 'Great Constitutional Discussion'". Journal of American History, 1993
- Berkshire Conference of Women Historians, Prize for the best article for "Domesticating Virtue", 1988
- Organization of American Historians Binkley-Stephenson Award for "The Female Animal", 1973
- Prize for best article, "Beauty, the Beast and the Militant Woman", American Quarterly, 1971
- Phi Beta Kappa, Connecticut College for Women, 1957
