= Harry J. Haiselden =

American surgeon and eugenicist (1870–1919)

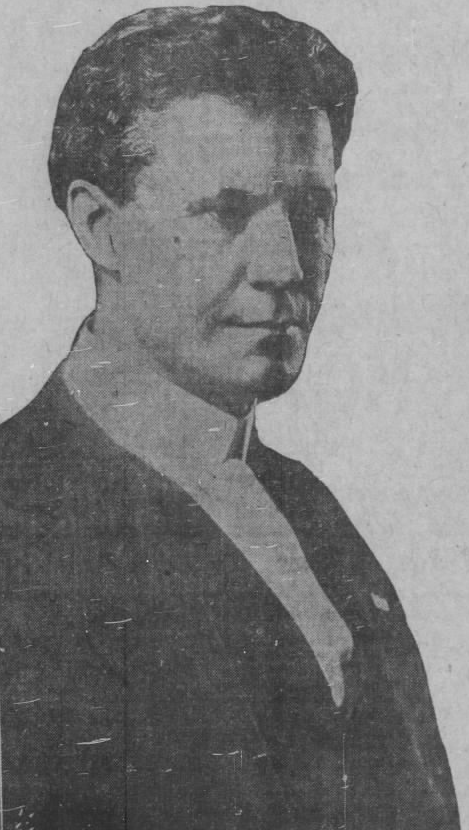
- Born: Harry John Haiselden; March 16, 1870; Plano, Illinois, U.S.
- Died: June 18, 1919 (aged 49); Havana, Cuba
- Education: University of Illinois College of Medicine
- Occupation: Surgeon
- Known for: Eugenics

Harry John Haiselden (March 16, 1870 – June 18, 1919) was an American physician and the Chief Surgeon at the German-American Hospital in Chicago, Illinois. Haiselden gained notoriety in 1915, when he refused to perform needed surgery for children born with severe birth defects and allowed the babies to die, in an act of eugenics. The film The Black Stork was made by him, about him, and starred him.

== Biography ==
Haiselden was born on March 16, 1870, in Plano, Illinois, to George W. Haiselden and Elizabeth Dickey. George Haiselden was a painter before he disappeared from public record. Haiselden rarely mentioned his father, but was extremely close to his mother. In 1893 he graduated from the University of Illinois College of Medicine. From 1893 to 1906, Haiselden served as Christian Fenger's resident at the German Hospital. In 1896 when Fenger opened the German-American Hospital, Haiselden became his assistant until Fenger's death in 1902 when Haiselden assumed the position of Chief Surgeon and Hospital president. The same year he joined Fenger at the German-American Hospital (renamed Grant Hospital during WWI), Haiselden opened the Bethesda Industrial Home for Incurables. Little is known about this institution, but Haiselden later became an outspoken opponent of institutionalization of the mentally ill. His experience with the Illinois State Institution for the Feebleminded in Lincoln, Illinois, exposed him to the horrors of institutionalization and would later help justify his decision to let deformed infants die rather than grow up to become institutionalized themselves. Haiselden never married but did adopt two children, Dorothy Riggs and Beulah Hope Wesley, who had been abandoned at Haiselden's hospital.

Early on the morning of November 12, 1915, another doctor at the German-American Hospital awakened Haiselden and informed him that patient Anna Bollinger had given birth to a baby boy with serious birth defects. Though Haiselden determined that surgery could save the infant's life, he advised the parents to take no action, convinced that their son could never lead a normal life. Five days later the baby, Allan Bollinger, died. Haiselden then began a vigorous publicity campaign in defense of his decision, turning the Bollinger case into a major news story across the United States. His actions provoked passionate arguments both supporting and condemning his actions. Settlement house movement leader Jane Addams spoke out against him, as well as Cornelia Brant, Dean of New York Medical College and Hospital for Women. Nurse and reform advocate Lillian Wald supported him. Helen Keller penned an article for The New Republic entitled "Physicians' juries for defective babies," in which she advocated on Haiselden's behalf. "It is the possibility of happiness, intelligence and power that give life its sanctity," she wrote, "and they are absent in the case of a poor, misshapen, paralyzed, unthinking creature." While the debate raged on, the Chicago Medical Society threatened Haiselden with expulsion for his decision to allow Allan Bollinger to die. He was cleared by a coroner's jury, but was eventually thrown out of practice by the Chicago Medical Board for his lecture series on eugenics and promotion of The Black Stork.

Haiselden starred as himself in The Black Stork, a 1917 silent movie that dramatized the events of the Bollinger case. Haiselden wrote the movie in conjunction with Jack Lait, a muckraking journalist. The National Board of Review of Motion Pictures almost banned the film but after surveying opinions from prominent review board members from across the country, decided to require 18 changes to the film before permitting its release. Haiselden complied with the majority of the NBRMP's requests and the board allowed its release. Because of the film's controversial content, theaters offered special male-only and female-only viewings. In 1918 it was played under the title Are You Fit to Marry? and continued to appear in theaters until as late as 1942.

Haiselden died while vacationing in Cuba on June 18, 1919, of a cerebral hemorrhage.

== Haiselden deaths by refusal of medical intervention ==
- Allan J. Bollinger (often referred to by pseudonyms Baby Bollinger or John Bollinger), November 1915
- Grace Werder, December 2, 1915
- Daughter of William and Eva Meter, July 24, 1917

=== Possible death ===
- Child of Stephen Hodzima (Paul Hodzima), November 1917. In addition to lack of treatment, Haiselden prescribed a narcotic to ease and speed Paul's death, but Paul's mother stopped administering the drugs under pressure from the public. What happened to Paul afterwards is unknown.

== See also ==
- Child euthanasia
- The Black Stork
