= Jennicet Gutiérrez =

Mexican activist

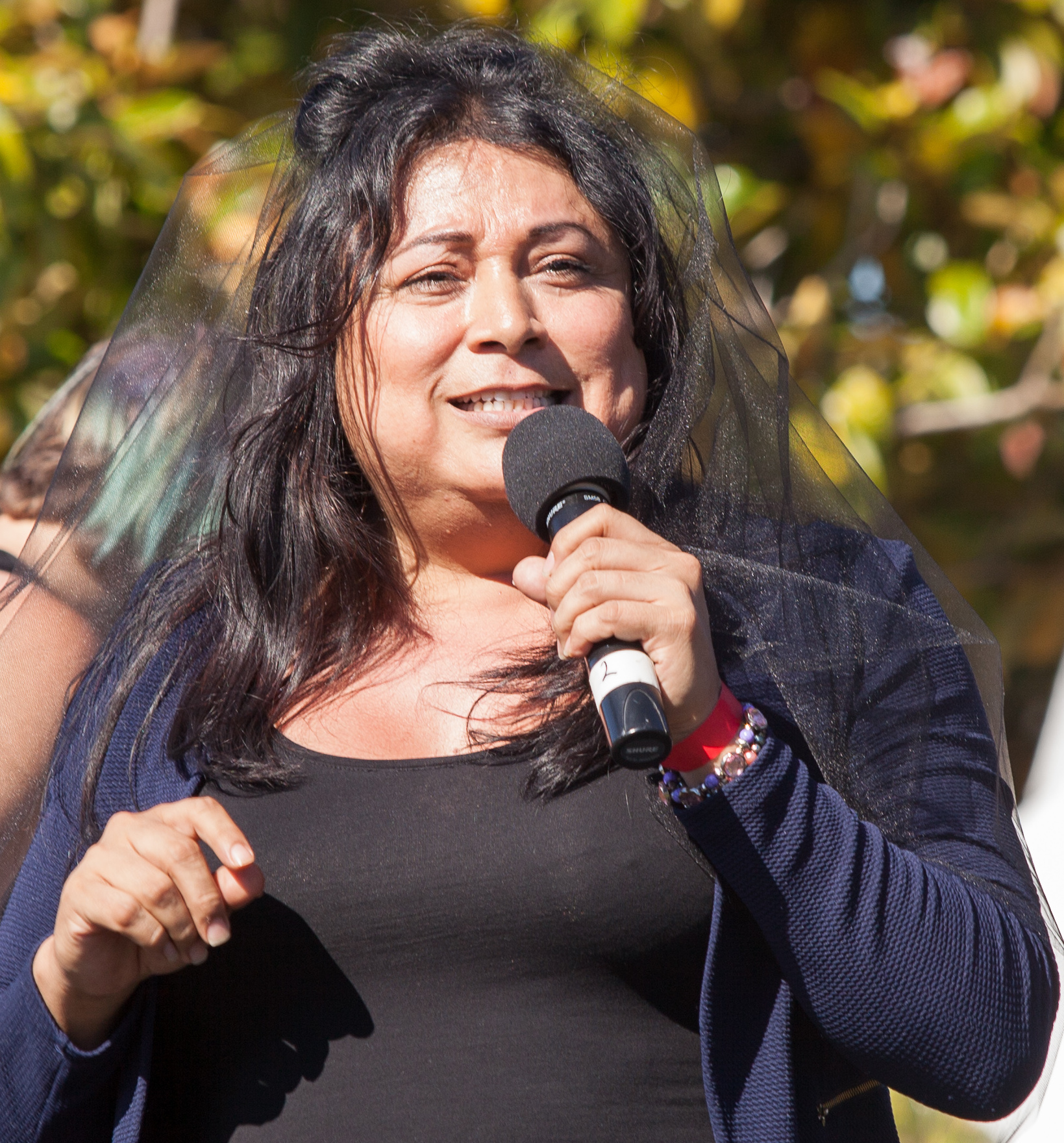
- Gutiérrez speaks at the 2018 San Francisco Trans March
- Born: June 8, 1986 (age 40); Tuxpan, Jalisco, Mexico
- Known for: Transgender and immigrant rights activism

Jennicet Gutiérrez (born June 8, 1986) is an activist for transgender rights and immigrant rights. A founding member of La Familia: Trans Queer Liberation Movement, much of her activist work supports trans women detained for their immigration status. She was named on Out magazine's Out100 list in 2015. Gutiérrez is based in Los Angeles, California.

== Early life ==
Gutiérrez was born in Tuxpan, Jalisco, Mexico in 1986. She immigrated to the United States with her family when she was 15 years old. She writes that she came to the United States seeking safety and economic opportunity. Gutiérrez hopes to attain permanent resident status. Gutiérrez had only known how to speak Spanish before immigrating to the United States. During her time in high school in the States she would learn how to speak English, while also learning the adversities she will face of being an undocumented immigrant.

== Activist work ==
June 2015 was when Gutiérrez received national attention after she interrupted President Obama during a dinner at the White House celebrating LGBTQ accomplishments in the previous year. Much of the reaction to this act centered on assessing whether it was "right" or "wrong" to interrupt the President during a reception at the Whitehouse. The event highlighted disconnects between mainstream gay activism and transgender and immigration reform activism.

La Familia: Trans Queer Liberation Movement works at the national and local levels to achieve the collective liberation of LGBT Latinas by leading an intergenerational movement through community organizing, advocacy, and education. Gutiérrez has been working with the organization hosting demonstrations, rallies, and dialogues, as well as fundraising for the liberation of undocumented transgender women of color facing unsafe environments in detention centers.

Gutiérrez's activism has been said to make sure that no one lives in fear, but instead, be celebrated for who they are.
