= Chicago Medical Society =

Medical society for Cook County, Illinois, US

Chicago Medical Society logo

The Chicago Medical Society is the medical society for Cook County, Illinois, United States. It was founded in 1850.

== History ==
The society was founded in 1850 and is one of the oldest medical societies in the United States. The first president was Levi Boone who also served as the mayor of Chicago. It began to publish the Chicago Medical Recorder in 1891, its papers having previously been published in the journals of other medical societies. Among the notable papers published in the journal is Dr. James G. Kiernan's, "Responsibility in Sexual Perversion".

== See also ==
- History of public health in Chicago
