= James G. Kiernan =

American psychologist

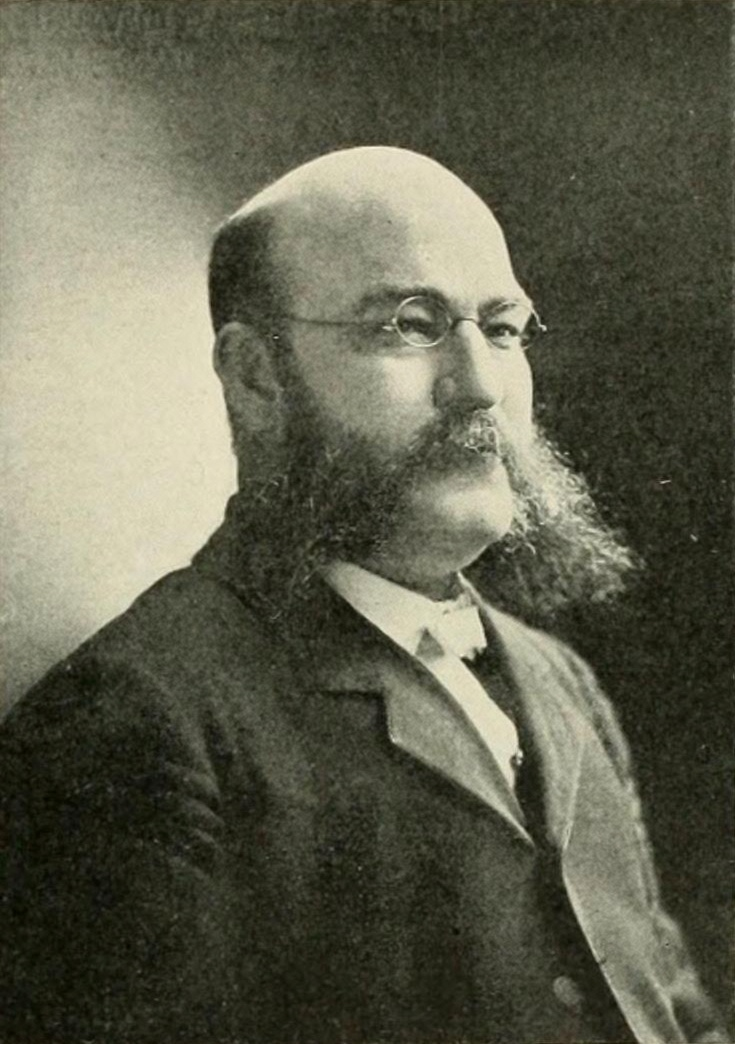
Kiernan, c. 1900

James George Kiernan (18 June 1852 – 1 July 1923) was an American psychiatrist, prominent in American gay history for the first recorded use of the terms "heterosexual" and "homosexual" in 1892.

Jonathan Ned Katz, historian of the American gay and lesbian experience, cites Kiernan's initial attribution of perversion to the term "heterosexual." Kiernan went on to write of a variety of topics, e.g. Mary MacLane's disciple Viola Larsen, who stole a horse and wrote romantic letters to other girls, as an example of child precocity and possible genius.

Kiernan also notably testified in support of the insanity defense at the trial of Charles J. Guiteau, who assassinated President Garfield in 1881.

Kiernan was born in New York and died at his home in Chicago.
