= The Black Stork =

1917 film

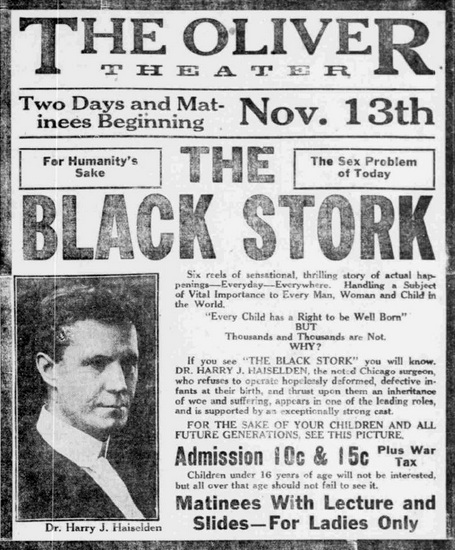
- Advertising for screenings at the Oliver Theater in Boston
- Directed by: Leopold Wharton; Theodore Wharton
- Written by: Harry J. Haiselden
- Starring: Jane Fearnley; Allan Murnane; Harry J. Haiselden
- Production company: The Whartons Studio
- Distributed by: Sheriott Pictures Corporation
- Release date: February 1917
- Running time: 5 reels
- Country: United States
- Language: Silent (English intertitles)

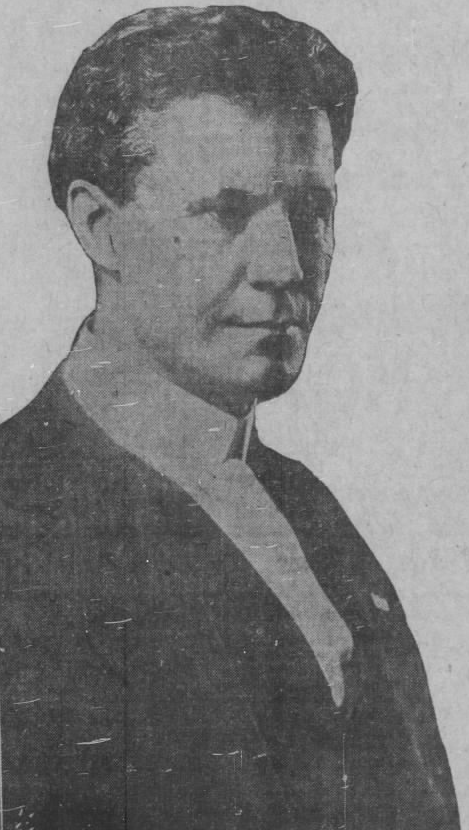
Dr. Harry J. Haiselden

The Black Stork, also known as Are You Fit To Marry?, is a 1916 American eugenic propaganda feature film promoting the star's real-life practice of eugenic infanticide and especially the controversy surrounding the death of Allan J. Bollinger. The film's title references the belief that black storks kill their unhealthy hatchlings.

The film opens with a warning that social problems such as crime and poverty are the result of careless management of human breeding, a core principle of eugenics. The main plot depicts a doctor who refuses life-saving care to a highly dysmorphic newborn baby having serious risks for very poor quality of life, telling the child's mother "God does not want this child to live." The medical profession is outraged, but the child's mother has a vision in which her child is visibly disabled, unhappy, and violent, and who has five disabled children of his own. As a result of this vision, she agrees to let the child die, and the film ends with Jesus receiving the infant's soul as the doctor looks on.

The film was extremely controversial at its initial release. Though Haiselden's actual infanticide had many supporters, the film itself was regarded as both poor quality and morally offensive. Despite the public backlash, The Black Stork was still shown nationwide as late as 1928. After 1918, the movie was renamed Are You Fit To Marry? and remained in theaters and traveling road shows as late as 1942.

== Dr. Harry J. Haiselden ==
Harry J. Haiselden was born on March 16, 1870, to George W. Haiselden and Elizabeth Dickey. Haiselden earned a medical degree from the University of Illinois College of Medicine in 1893. During the 1910s Haiselden worked at the Illinois State Institution for the Feebleminded in Lincoln, Illinois.

While working as surgeon-in-chief at the German-American Hospital in Chicago, Haiselden refused life-saving care to at least six disabled infants, resulting in their deaths. After the death of Baby Bollinger in 1915, Haiselden was exonerated by a coroner's jury. Haiselden spoke openly about the killings, encouraging parents and other physicians to follow his example.

Haiselden died in 1919 while on vacation in Havana.

== Allan J. Bollinger Case ==
On November 12, 1915, Anna Bollinger gave birth to Allan J. Bollinger, a baby with multiple congenital anomalies. Sources frequently use the pseudonym "John" or simply "Baby." He was born with an imperforate anus, kidney abnormalities, a missing external ear, a missing coccyx, pectus excavatum, partial paralysis, and a problem with the skin around the shoulder and neck. Haiselden refused to operate and encouraged the Bollingers to allow their baby to die rather than live "a life of idiocy." Anna Bollinger reportedly told the physician who delivered her baby, "This baby must not live. Please don't let my baby live to suffer." Allan J. Bollinger died at 10 o'clock at night on November 17, 1915, after five days of life.

John Dill Robertson, the Chicago Commissioner of Health, examined Allan Bollinger eight hours before his death. He wrote to the Journal of the American Medical Association, "I was startled to observe that this was not the defective baby I had expected to see." Robertson later testified that the baby's condition was treatable and that he would have operated if the baby had been his patient. While Robertson affirmed a physician's right to act according to his conscience and medical judgment, he worried about the precedent of accepting routine fatal neglect.

A coroner's jury of six physicians and surgeons determined that Haiselden was within his rights to refuse to operate and that Mr. and Mrs. Bollinger had been treated fairly. However, they rejected Haiselden's conclusion that the child would have grown up "mentally or morally defective" and affirmed that "the physician's highest duty is to relieve suffering and to save or prolong life." Haiselden and Robertson both testified that babies were frequently allowed to die by physicians but that this practice was largely secret; Haiselden estimated that this happened at a rate of at least one per day in Chicago. The jury asked Haiselden if he would let the baby die if he had another similar case in the future, and he affirmed that he would.

Haiselden spoke widely to the press regarding his role in the death. Newspapers ran a serialized account listing Haiselden as the author, though he later denied having written it. In it, Haiselden is quoted as saying, "this death came to me as the greatest victory of my career... I have never been able to regard Baby Bollinger as a human being. I was never able to believe that It could ever be more than a 'thing.'" The Chicago Medical Society objected to Haiselden's publicity of the case and charged him with unethical conduct. Noting that their decision was because of Haiselden's press and motion picture participation and not his medical decision, the Society voted to expel him.
