= Jonathan Ned Katz =

American author of human sexuality (born 1938)

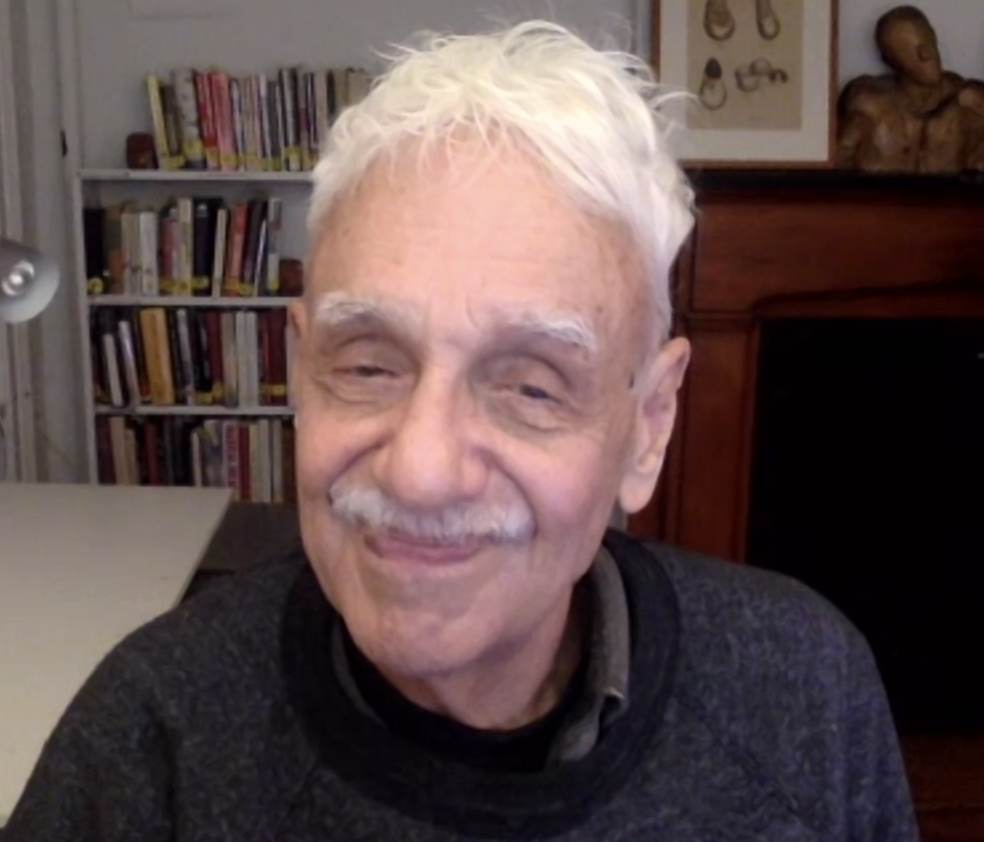
- Katz in 2021
- Born: 1938 (age 87–88); New York City, New York, U.S.
- Education: Antioch College; City College of New York; The New School; Hunter College
- Occupations: Author & US (LGBT) historian
- Employer: OutHistory
- Known for: OutHistory, writings and research on LGBT history
- Awards: Yale University's Brudner Prize (2003), National Gay and Lesbian Task Force's Community Service Award (1996), Publishing Triangle Whitehead Award (1995)

Jonathan Ned Katz (born 1938) is an American author of human sexuality who has focused on same-sex attraction and changes in the social organization of sexuality over time. His works focus on the idea, rooted in social constructionism, that the categories with which society describes and defines human sexuality are historically and culturally specific, along with the social organization of sexual activity, desire, relationships, and sexual identities.

== Early life and education ==
Katz graduated from the High School of Music & Art in New York City with a major in art in 1956. Since 2004, he has begun to emerge publicly as a visual artist. He went on to study at Antioch College, the City College of New York, The New School, and Hunter College. As a teenager, Katz was featured in Life magazine for his efforts to create a film version of Tom Sawyer.

== Career ==
Katz in PRIDE: Photographs After Stonewall by Fred W. McDarrah in a book display in New York City

Katz taught as an adjunct at Yale University, Eugene Lang College, and New York University, was the convener of a faculty seminar at Princeton University, and was a keynote speaker at Harvard University. He is a founding member of the Gay Academic Union in 1973 and the National Writers Union in 1980. He was the initiator and is the director of OutHistory.org, a site devoted to lesbian, gay, bisexual, transgender, queer, (LGBTQ) and heterosexual history, that went online in September 2008, and was produced in its first four years by the Center for Lesbian and Gay Studies, an institute at the City University of New York Graduate Center, under a grant from the Arcus Foundation. Since 2012, the site has been co-directed by Katz and others.

Katz received the Magnus Hirschfeld Medal for Outstanding Contributions to sex research from the German Society for Social-Scientific Sexuality Research in 1997. In 2003, he was given Yale University's Brudner Prize, an annual honor recognizing scholarly contributions in the field of lesbian and gay studies. His papers are collected by the manuscript division of The Research Libraries of The New York Public Library.

He received the Bill Whitehead Award for Lifetime Achievement from Publishing Triangle.

In 1975, the book series, Homosexuality: Lesbians and Gay Men in Society, History, and Literature: Documents of the Homosexual Rights Movement in Germany, 1836-1927 (Arno Press), which he edited received the American Library Association's Gay Book Award, a "grassroots acknowledgment honoring hallmark works in GLBT publishing".

Katz's historical work focuses on same-sex and different-sex relationships, and changes in the social construction of sexuality over time. His works stress that the social organization of human sexual activity, desire, relationships, and sexual identities are historically and culturally specific, along with the categories with which human sexuality are named, described, defined and understood.

== The Invention of Heterosexuality ==
The Invention of Heterosexuality was first published as an essay in 1990 and then expanded into a larger book. In it, Katz traces the development of heterosexual and homosexual as a historically specific ideology of sexuality and gender, looking at the gender expectations packed into it. He notes the radical change, in the late nineteenth century, from a sexual ethic of procreation to one based on erotic pleasure and sexual object choice. He notes that a procreation-based ethic condemns all non-procreative sex. A pleasure-based sexual ethic is concerned with procreative sex on a secondary level, if at all.

Katz follows the development of heterosexual as going through several stages. Coined in 1868 (in German, Heterosexualität) by Karl Heinrich Ulrichs, the term initially referred to a person with an overwhelming drive toward the opposite sex and was associated with a number of pathologized behaviors. In 1889, Richard Freiherr von Krafft-Ebing used the term in something like its modern-day sense. The first known use in America was in 1892, by James G. Kiernan. Here, it referred to some combination of bisexuality and a tendency to thwart the then-existing procreation ethic.

Krafft-Ebing's Psychopathia Sexualis, published in 1889, and then in English in 1892, marked the clear turning point from a procreation-based sexuality to a pleasure-based ethic which focused on a "different-sex"/"same-sex" distinction to define the normal and the abnormal. Krafft-Ebing did not, however, make a clean break from the old procreative standards. In much of the discourse of the time, the heterosexual was still a deviant figure, since it signified a person unconcerned with the old procreative sexual norm.

For a variety of economic and social reasons, Katz argues, during the end of the nineteenth and the beginning of the twentieth centuries, this new pleasure norm became more firmly established and naturalized, marking out new gender and sexual norms, new social and family arrangements, and new deviants and perverts. One of the important consequences of this line of thought which Katz notes in "Homosexual" and "Heterosexual": Questioning the Terms, is that projecting present sexual and gender categories on the past is with a limited degree of accuracy: "So profound is the historically specific character of sexual behavior that only with the loosest accuracy can we speak of sodomy in the early colonies and 'sodomy' in present-day New York as 'the same thing.' In another example, to speak of 'heterosexual behavior' as occurring universally is to apply one term to a great variety of activities produced within a great variety of sexual and gender systems."

== Bibliography ==
=== Books ===
- The Daring Life and Dangerous Times of Eve Adams. Chicago Review Press. 2021.
- Love Stories: Sex Between Men Before Homosexuality. University of Chicago Press, Dec. 2001. Co-winner John Boswell Prize, Committee on Lesbian and Gay History, 2003.
- The Invention of Heterosexuality. Dutton, 1995. Foreword by Gore Vidal. Afterword by Lisa Duggan. Translated and published in Brazil, Italy, France, Spain. Reprint: University of Chicago Press, June 2007. Cited by U.S. Supreme Court in majority opinion in Lawrence v. Texas, June 2003.
- Gay/Lesbian Almanac: A New Documentary. Harper & Row, 1983; reprint NY: Carroll & Graf, 1994. Number 21 on list of 100 Best Lesbian and Gay Nonfiction Books, a project of the Publishing Triangle, the association of lesbians and gay men in publishing.
- Gay American History: Lesbians and Gay Men in the U.S.A. T.Y. Crowell, 1976; reprints Avon, 1977; Harper & Row, 1985; New American Library 1992. Number 3 on list of 100 Best Lesbian and Gay Nonfiction Books, a project of the Publishing Triangle, the association of lesbians and gay men in publishing.
- Coming Out! A Documentary Play About Gay Life and Lesbian Life Liberation. Arno Press-NY Times, 1975.
- Resistance at Christiana: The Fugitive Slave Rebellion, Christiana, Pennsylvania, 1851. T.Y. Crowell, 1974.
- Black Woman: A Fictionalized Biography of Lucy Terry Prince. [Co-author Bernard Katz] Pantheon, 1973.

=== Articles ===
- "The Invention of Heterosexuality", published in Socialist Review 20, 1990. Expanded as book.
- "'Homosexual' and 'Heterosexual': Questioning the Terms", published in A Queer World, 1997

== See also ==
- OutHistory
- History of sex
- Queer studies
- Queer theory
- Jonathan David Katz (born 1958), professor of queer studies
