= African-American family structure =

Matter of national public policy interest

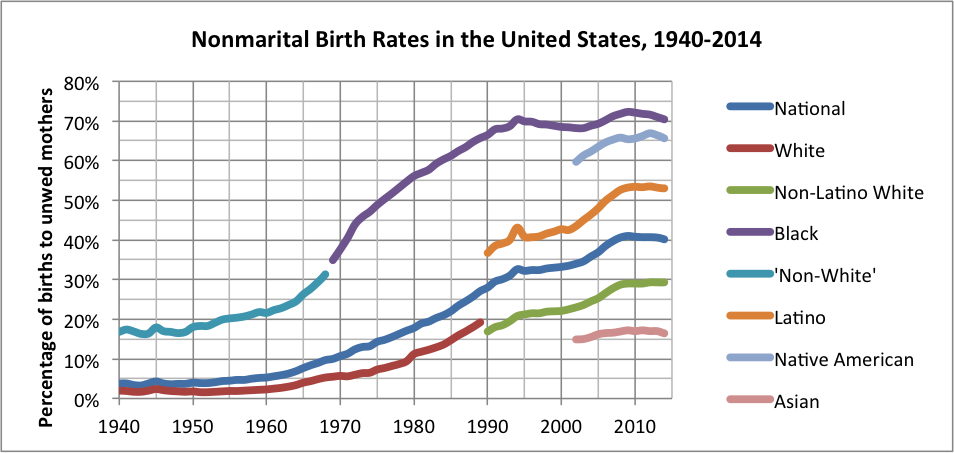
The out of wedlock birth rates by race in the United States from 1940 to 2014. The rate for African Americans is the purple line. Data is from the National Vital Statistics System Reports published by the CDC National Center for Health Statistics. Note: Prior to 1969, African American out of wedlock births were included along with other minority groups as "Non-White."

Family structure refers to the composition of a family, including present members and important figures from the past, as well as the quality of relationships among them. It can be visualized using a genogram to depict the family's structure, composition, and relationships. A nuclear family consists of a pair of adults and their sociologically recognized biological chlldren.

The initial involuntary migration of African Americans to the United States caused an ad hoc family structure, based on enslaved people who lived in proximity to one another, and changing as people were sold, died prematurely or disconnected in some other manner. This created more emphasis on the extended family and non-biological connectedness of people as opposed to formalized titles and relationships. The continued need for extended non-biological "family" continued throughout Reconstruction and Jim Crow because of the prevalence at which nuclear families were disrupted because of premature death, primarily of fathers, grandfathers and other male figureheads. There are exceptions to this, as evidenced by the detailed genealogical detail documented by the Blackwell Family of Virginia, an African-American family that traces its roots back to a woman who arrived in Virginia in 1735.

Many notable African American figures throughout history have grown up in single-parent homes due to their fathers being killed. Examples include Malcolm X, whose father Earl Little died while tied to rail tracks, and Emmett Till, whose father Louis Till was lynched while serving in the United States Army. This helped to normalize within the culture to not blame or ostracize the woman for being a single mother, which had a significant impact on the acceptability of out of wedlock childbirth.

The family structure of African Americans has long been a matter of national public policy interest. A 1965 report by Daniel Patrick Moynihan, known as The Moynihan Report, examined the link between black poverty and family structure. It hypothesized that the destruction of the black nuclear family structure would hinder further progress toward economic and political equality.

When Moynihan wrote in 1965 on the coming destruction of the black family, the out-of-wedlock birth rate was 25% among black people. In 1991, 68% of black children were born outside of marriage (where 'marriage' is defined with a government-issued license). According to the CDC/NCHS Vital statistic report 1970–2010, in 2011, 72% of black babies were born to unmarried mothers, while the 2018 National Vital Statistics Report provides a figure of 69.4 percent for this condition. The information was compiled using birth certificate information. The data reflects births for mothers 15–44 years of age and excludes older women. Changes in reporting procedures for marital status occurred in some states during the 1990s.and the report footnotes also make clear that the report refers to national numbers however there were states that did not report data.

Among all newlyweds, 18.0% of black Americans in 2015 married non-black spouses. 24% of all black male newlyweds in 2015 married outside their race, compared with 12% of black female newlyweds. 5.5% of black males married white women in 1990.

== History ==
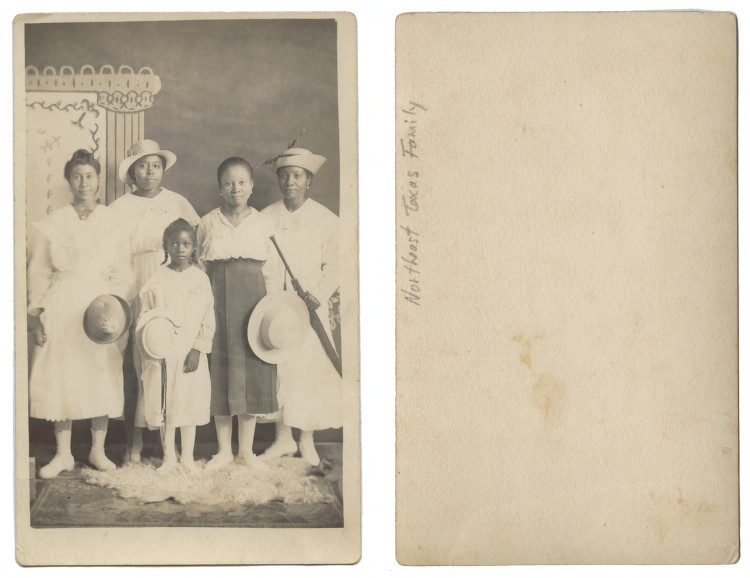
An African American family, photographed between 1918 and 1922. Courtesy of the DeGolyer Library, Southern Methodist University.

Due to the unique and devastating migratory method by which African Americans were introduced into the Americas—through the transatlantic slave trade—many people arrived not as intact families, but as individuals forcibly separated from their families.

Slaves were denied marriage.

This violent displacement disrupted traditional African family structures, creating a legacy of fragmented families and community ties that would shape the African American experience for centuries. As a result, the evolution of African American family structure must be understood in distinct periods, each reflecting the impact of slavery, emancipation, and systemic racial oppression.

White sugar planters opted to enhance their profits by consistently favoring a male labor force, a strategy that necessitated the systematic importation of male slaves. This approach resulted in significant demographic and social ramifications, including the prevalence of matrifocal family structures, enforced celibacy among men, early widowhood for women, and the absence of fathers in the lives of children. These effects are thought to have influenced family dynamics over the long term (Smith 1982). In North America, while the overall slave population experienced rapid growth, sugar plantations in the United States were an anomaly, mirroring the characteristics of those in the Caribbean and Latin America. The sugar plantations in the United States were predominantly located in a limited number of counties in southern Louisiana and adjacent states. The conditions of slavery and the enforced celibacy in the United States, where men struggled to find partners in predominantly male environments, have been associated with a rise in the prevalence of single-mother households. Additionally, the higher incidence of extended families among African Americans can be traced back to the vulnerabilities imposed on the nuclear family structure by slavery.

This historical context is essential for examining how African American families adapted, survived, and evolved over time in response to these external pressures.

- 1650–1700: African family structures were heavily fragmented by the transatlantic slave trade and early colonial slavery.
- 1700–1750: Codified laws institutionalized matrilineal slavery, further disrupting African American family bonds.
- 1750–1800: Enslaved communities developed extended kinship networks and fictive kin structures in response to family separations.
- 1800–1850: The domestic slave trade caused widespread family disintegration, but informal family bonds persisted.
- 1850–1900: After emancipation, African Americans worked to reunite families and formalize marriages, but the ongoing economic and social challenges persisted.

A study of 1880 family structures in Philadelphia, showed that three-quarters of black families were nuclear families, composed of two parents and children. Data from U.S. census reports reveal that between 1880 and 1960, married households consisting of two-parent homes were the most widespread form of African-American family structures. Although the most popular, married households decreased over this time period. Single-parent homes, on the other hand, remained relatively stable until 1960; when they rose dramatically.

According to data extracted from 1910 U.S. census manuscripts, compared to white women, black women were more likely to become teenage mothers, stay single and have marriage instability, and were thus much more likely to live in female-headed single-parent homes. This pattern has been known as black matriarchy because of the observance of many households headed by women.

In the Harlem neighborhood of New York City in 1925, 85% of kin-related black households had two parents.

The breakdown of the black family was first brought to national attention in 1965 by sociologist and later Democratic Senator Daniel Patrick Moynihan, in the groundbreaking Moynihan Report (also known as "The Negro Family: The Case For National Action"). Moynihan's report made the argument that the relative absence of nuclear families (those having both a married father and mother present) in black America would greatly hinder further black socio-economic progress.

When Moynihan warned in his 1965 report on the coming destruction of the black family, however, the out-of-wedlock birthrate had increased to 25% among the black population. This figure continued to rise over time and in 1991, 68% of black children were born outside of marriage.

U.S. census data from 2010 reveal that more African-American families consisted of single mothers than married households with both parents. In 2011, it was reported that 72% of black babies were born to unmarried mothers. As of 2015, at 77.3%, black Americans have the highest rate of non-marital births among native-born Americans.

In 2016, 29% of African Americans were married, while 48% of all Americans were. Also, 50% of African Americans have never been married in contrast to 33% of all Americans. In 2016 just under half (48%) of black women had never been married which is an increase from 44% in 2008 and 42.7% in 2005. 52% of black men had never been married. Also, 15% percent of black men were married to non-black women which is up from 11% in 2010. Black women were the least likely to marry non-black men at only 7% in 2017.

By 2019 marriage rates continued to differ quite a lot across racial and ethnic groups. About 57% of white adults and 63% of Asian adults are married, but for Hispanic adults it's 48%, and even lower for Black adults at 33%. Since '95, marriage has dropped for white, Black, and Hispanic adults, but it's stayed fairly steady for Asians. When you look at cohabiting, however, the numbers are more similar – around 8% for white and Hispanic adults, 7% for Black adults, and just 3% for Asians. Living together without being married has gone up for white, Black, and Hispanic adults in the last few decades, but less so for Asian adults.

Some African Americans have moved to Africa for cultural and economic reasons, they are marrying into traditional African customs and family units.

The African-American family structure has been divided into a twelve-part typology that is used to show the differences in the family structure based on "gender, marital status, and the presence or absence of children, other relatives or non-relatives."

In Climbing Jacob's Ladder: The Enduring Legacy of African-American Families, Andrew Billingsley presents a 12-part typology of African American family structures to capture the diversity and complexity of family forms. The typology includes the following categories:

1. Nuclear Families – Traditional two-parent households with biological children.
2. Extended Families – Families that include additional relatives beyond the immediate nuclear family, such as grandparents, aunts, uncles, or cousins.
3. Augmented Families – Households that include non-blood relatives or family friends who take on roles similar to biological family members.
4. Single-Parent Families – Families headed by a single parent, typically a mother, raising children on their own.
5. Remarried or Blended Families – Families formed through remarriage, where children from previous relationships are part of the household.
6. Foster Families – Families that temporarily or permanently care for children who are not their biological offspring.
7. Adoptive Families – Families that legally adopt children and integrate them as permanent members.
8. Separated Families – Families where one or more parents live apart from their children, either due to work, incarceration, or other reasons.
9. Child-Headed Families – Households where children take on the primary caregiving role due to the absence or incapacity of parents.
10. Elderly-Headed Families – Families where grandparents or elderly relatives are the primary caregivers for children.
11. Communal Families – Families formed within community or social groups where child-rearing and resources are shared collectively.
12. Same-Sex Families – Families headed by same-sex couples raising children.

Billingsley identifies several substrata within African American families that reflect the diversity and complexity of their structures. These substrata, or substructures, help explain how African American families adapt to various social, economic, and historical challenges, essentially what external factors encourage the creation of ad hoc "families" in the African American community. The key substrata identified by Billingsley include:

1. Economic Substructure – Refers to the financial and material foundation of families, including employment, income, and wealth. Billingsley highlights the economic disparities faced by African American families and how this impacts family stability and functioning.
2. Emotional Substructure – Focuses on the emotional bonds and relationships within families, such as love, trust, and caregiving. The emotional substructure is crucial for family cohesion and the well-being of individual members.
3. Cultural Substructure – Encompasses the values, traditions, and customs that are passed down through generations. This substructure includes the role of spirituality, religious practices, and cultural resilience, which have been central to African American family life.
4. Social Substructure – Refers to the social networks and community support systems that families rely on, including extended family, friends, neighbors, and churches. Billingsley emphasizes the importance of these networks in providing support, especially in times of crisis.
5. Legal and Political Substructure – Relates to how laws, policies, and political systems affect African American families. This includes the impact of slavery, segregation, discriminatory housing and employment policies, and the criminal justice system.

== African-American families at a glance ==
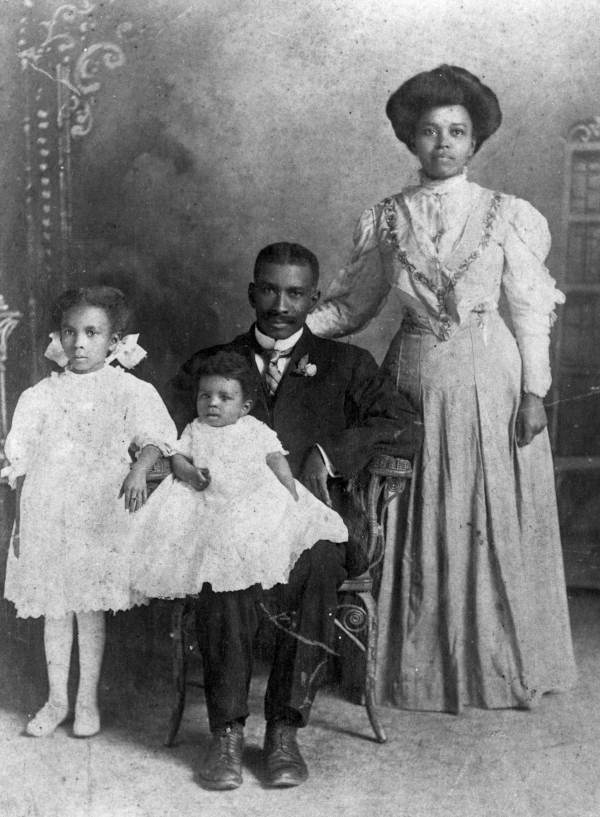
The family of teacher Hampton Cornell Williams, Emma Christie Williams, and children in Gainesville, Florida, circa 1900.

=== African-American nuclear families ===
Andrew Billingsley's research on the African-American nuclear family is organized into four groups: Incipient Nuclear, Simple Nuclear, Segmented Nuclear I, and Segmented Nuclear II. He defines a nuclear family as the traditional family recognized with two parents and their offspring, whereas the Segmented nuclear family is one where there is limited or no contact with extended family, possibly due to systemic issues within the society that place extraordinary pressures on the family unit, such as needing to move, smaller housing choices and incarceration. These pressures make staying in contact with extended family more difficult; therefore, the traditional support that extended family provides in helping relieve family pressure and keep families together is a missing element in many families in the African American community.

In 1992, Paul Glick supplied statistics showing the African-American nuclear family structure consisted of 80% of total African-American families in comparison to 90% of all US families. According to Billingsley, the African-American incipient nuclear family structure is defined as a married couple with no children.

In 1992, 47% of African-American families had a nuclear family in comparison to 54% of all US nuclear families. The African-American simple nuclear family structure has been defined as a married couple with children. This is the traditional norm for the composition of African-American families. In 1992 25% of African-American families were simple nuclear families in comparison to 36% of all US families.

The African-American segmented nuclear I and II family structures are defined as a parent +child(ren) household. In 1992, 94% of African-American segmented nuclear families were composed of an unmarried mother and child(ren). Glick's research found that single parent families are twice as prevalent in African-American families as they are in other races, and this gap continues to widen.

=== African-American extended families ===
Billingsley's research continued with the African-American extended family structure, which is composed of primary members plus other relatives. Extended families have the same sub-structures as nuclear families, incipient, simple, segmented I, and segmented II, with the addition of grandparents, aunts, uncles, cousins and additional family members. Billingsley's research found that the extended family structure is predominantly in the segmented I sub-structured families.

In 1992, 47% of all African-American extended families were segmented extended family structures, compared to 12% of all other races combined. Billingsley's research shows that in the African-American family the extended relative is often the grandparents.

=== African-American augmented families ===
Billingsley's research revealed another type of African-American family, called the augmented family structure, which is a family composed of the primary members, plus nonrelatives. Billingsley's case study found that this family structure accounted for 8% of black families in 1990. This family structure is different from the traditional norm family discussed earlier, it combines the nuclear and extended family units with nonrelatives. This structure also has the incipient, simple, segmented I, and segmented II sub-structures.

=== Non-family households ===
Billingsley introduced a new family structure that branches from the augmented family structure. The African-American population is starting to see a new structure known as a non-family household. This non-family household contains no relatives. According to Glick in 1992, 37% of all households in the United States were a nonfamily household, with more than half of this percentage being African-Americans.

=== African-American interracial marriages ===
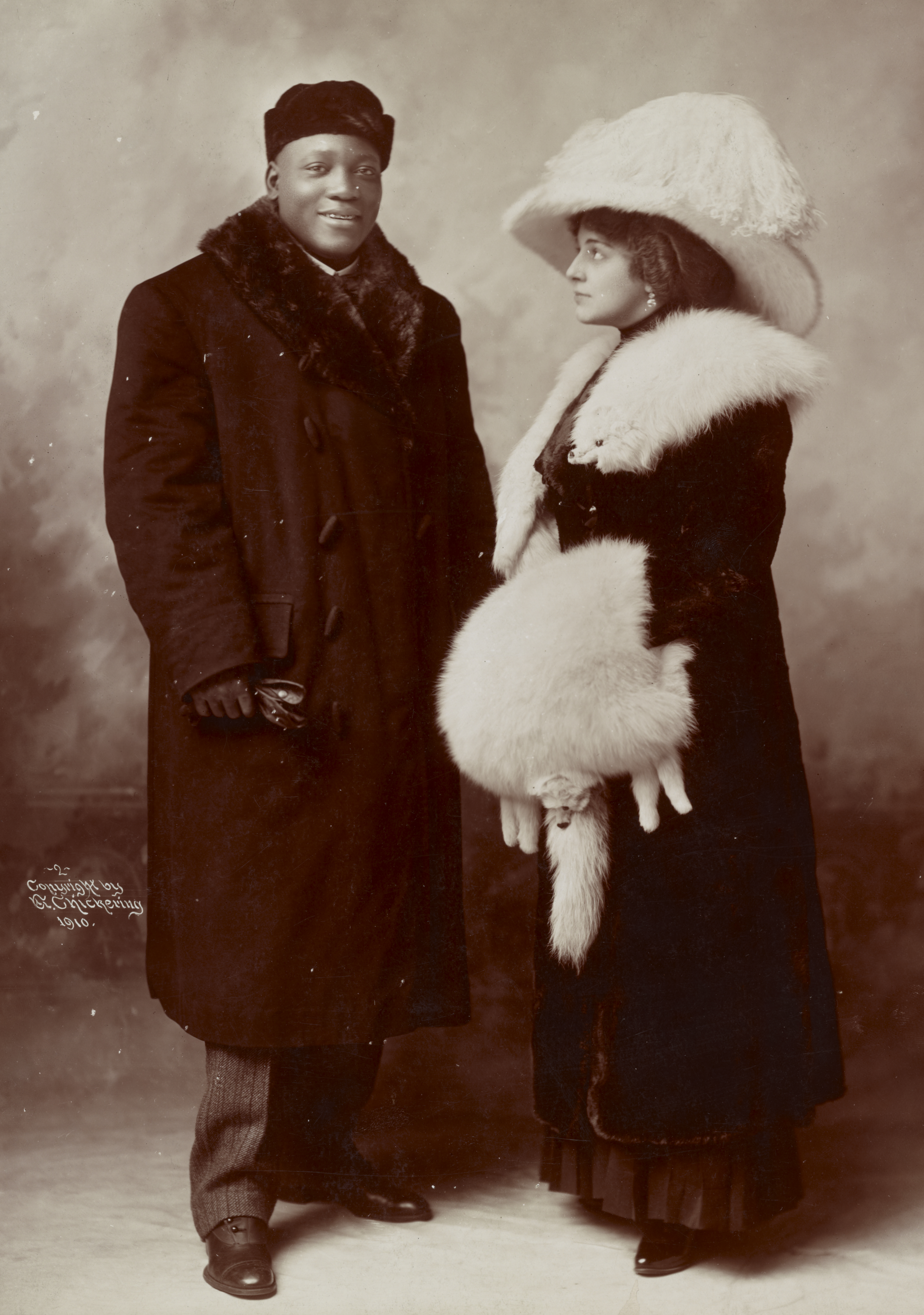
Champion boxer Jack Johnson with his wife Etta in 1910

Among all newlyweds, 18.0% of Black Americans in 2015 married someone whose race or ethnicity was different from their own. 24% of all Black male newlyweds in 2015 married outside their race, compared with 12% of Black female newlyweds.

In the United States there has been a historical disparity between Black female and Black male exogamy ratios. There were 354,000 White female/Black male and 196,000 Black female/White male marriages in March 2009, representing a ratio of 181:100.

This traditional disparity has seen a rapid decline over the last two decades, contrasted with its peak in 1981 when the ratio was still 371:100. In 2007, 4.6% of all married Black people in the United States were wed to a White partner, and 0.4% of all White people were married to a Black partner.

The overall rate of African-Americans marrying non-Black spouses has more than tripled between 1980 and 2015, from 5% to 18%.

== African-American family members at a glance ==
E. Franklin Frazier has described the current African-American family structure as having two models, one in which the father is viewed as a patriarch and the sole breadwinner, and one where the mother takes on a matriarchal role in the place of a fragmented household. In defining family, James Stewart describes it as "an institution that interacts with other institutions forming a social network."

Stewart's research concludes that the African-American family has traditionally used this definition to structure institutions that upholds values tied to other black institutions resulting in unique societal standards that deal with "economics, politics, education, health, welfare, law, culture, religion, and the media." Ruggles argues that the modern black U.S. family has seen a change in this tradition and is now viewed as predominantly single parent, specifically black matriarchy.

=== Father representative ===
In 1997, McAdoo stated that African-American families are "frequently regarded as poor, fatherless, dependent of governmental assistance, and involved in producing a multitude of children outside of wedlock." Thomas, Krampe and Newton show that in 2005 39% of African-American children did not live with their biological father and 28% of African-American children did not live with any father representative, compared to 15% of white children who were without a father representative. In the African-American culture, the father representative has historically acted as a role model for two out of every three African-American children.

Thomas, Krampe, and Newton relies on a 2002 survey that shows how the father's lack of presence has resulted in several negative effects on children ranging from education performance to teen pregnancy. Whereas the father presence tends to have an opposite effect on children, increasing their chances on having a greater life satisfaction. Thomas, Krampe, and Newton's research shows that 32% of African-American fathers rarely to never visit their children, compared to 11% of white fathers.

In 2001, Hamer showed that many African-American youth did not know how to approach their father when in his presence. This survey also concluded that the non resident fathers who did visit their child said that their role consisted of primarily spending time with their children, providing discipline and being a role model. John McAdoo also noted that the residential father role consists of being the provider and decision maker for the household. This concept of the father's role resembles the theory of hegemonic masculinity. Quaylan Allan suggests that the continuous comparison of white hegemonic masculinity to black manhood, can also add a negative effect on the presence of the father in the African-American family structure

=== Mother representative ===
Melvin Wilson suggests that in the African-American family structure a mother's role is determined by her relationship status (whether she is a single mother or a married mother). According to Wilson, in most African-American married families a mother's roles is dominated by her household responsibilities. Wilson research states that African-American married families, in contrast to White families, do not have gender specific roles for household services. The mother and wife is responsible for all household services around the house.

According to Wilson, the married mother's tasks around the house is described as a full-time job. This full-time job of household responsibilities is often the second job that an African-American woman takes on. The first job is her regular 8 hour work day that she spends outside of the home. Wilson also notes that this responsibility that the mother has in the married family determines the life satisfaction of the family as a whole.

Melvin Wilson states that the single mother role in the African-American family is played by 94% of African-American single parents. According to Brown, single parent motherhood in the African-American culture is becoming more a "proactive" choice. Melvin Wilson's research shows 62% of single African-American women said this choice is in response to divorce, adoption, or just non-marriage compared to 33% of single white women. In this position African-American single mothers see themselves playing the role of the mother and the father.

Though the role of a single mother is similar to the role of a married mother, to take care of household responsibilities and work a full-time job, the single mothers' responsibility is greater since she does not have a second party income that a partner would provide for her family members. According to Brown, this lack of a second party income has resulted in the majority of African-American children raised in single mother households having a poor upbringing.

=== Child ===
In Margaret Spencer's case study on children living in southern metropolitan areas, she shows that children can only grow through enculturation of a particular society. The child's development is dependent on three areas: child-rearing practices, individual heredity, and experienced cultural patterns. Spencer's research also concludes that African-American children have become subject to inconsistencies in society based on their skin color. These inconsistencies continue to place an increased amount of environmental stress on African-American families which result in the failure of most African-American children to reach their full potential.

Similar to most races, challenges that African-American families experience are usually dependent on the children's age groups. The African-American families experience a great deal of mortality within the infant and toddler age group. In particular the infant mortality rate is "twice as high for black children as for children in the nation as a whole." The mortality in this age group is accompanied by a significant number of illnesses in the pre- and post-natal care stages, along with the failure to place these children into a positive, progressive learning environment once they become toddlers. This foundation has led to African-American children facing teen pregnancy, juvenile detention, and other behavioral issues because they were not given the proper development to successfully face the world and social inconsistencies they will encounter.

=== Extended family members ===
Jones, Zalot, Foster, Sterrett, and Chester executed a study examining the childrearing assistance given to young adults and African-American single mothers. The majority of extended family members, including aunts, uncles, cousins, grandparents, and occasionally non-relatives, are put into this category. In Jones research she also notes that 97% of single mothers aged 28–40 admitted that they rely on at least one extended family member for assistance in raising their children.

Extended family members have an immense amount of responsibility in the majority of African-American families, especially single parent households. According to Jones, the reason these extended family members are included in having a necessary role in the family is because they play a key role in assuring the health and well-being of the children. The extended family members' responsibilities range from child rearing, financial assistance, offering a place to live, and meals.

== Theories ==
=== Economic theories ===
There are several hypotheses – both social and economic – explaining the persistence of the current African-American family structure. Some researchers theorize that the low economic statuses of the newly freed slaves in 1850 led to the current family structure for African Americans. These researchers suggest that extreme poverty has increased the destabilization of African American families while others point to high female labor participation, few job opportunities for black males, and small differences between wages for men and women that have decreased marriage stability for black families.

Another economic theory dates back to the late 1950s and early '60s, the creation of the "Man-in-the-House" rule; this restricted two parent households from receiving government benefits which made many black fathers move out to be able to receive help to support their families. These rules were later abolished when the Supreme Court ruled against these exclusions in the case of King vs Smith.

Economic status has proved to not always negatively affect single-parent homes, however. Rather, in an 1880 census, there was a positive relationship between the number of black single-parent homes and per-capita county wealth. Moreover, literate young mothers in the 1880s were less likely to reside in a home with a spouse than illiterate mothers. This suggests that economic factors following slavery alone cannot account for the family styles seen by African Americans since blacks who were illiterate and lived in the worst neighborhoods were the most likely to live in a two-parent home.

=== Traditional African influences ===
Other explanations incorporate social mechanisms for the specific patterns of the African American family structure. Some researchers point to differences in norms regarding the need to live with a spouse and with children for African-Americans. Patterns seen in traditional African cultures are also considered a source for the current trends in single-parent homes. As noted by Antonio McDaniel, the reliance of African-American families on kinship networks for financial, emotional, and social support can be traced back to African cultures, where the emphasis was on extended families, rather than the nuclear family.

Some researchers have hypothesized that these African traditions were modified by experiences during slavery, resulting in a current African-American family structure that relies more on extended kin networks. The author notes that slavery caused a unique situation for African slaves in that it alienated them from both true African and white culture so that slaves could not identify completely with either culture. As a result, slaves were culturally adaptive and formed family structures that best suit their environment and situation.

=== Post-1960s expansion of the U.S. welfare state ===
The American economists Walter E. Williams and Thomas Sowell argue that the significant expansion of federal welfare under the Great Society programs beginning in the 1960s contributed to the destruction of African American families. Sowell has argued: "The black family, which had survived centuries of slavery and discrimination, began rapidly disintegrating in the liberal welfare state that subsidized unwed pregnancy and changed welfare from an emergency rescue to a way of life."

There are several other factors which may have accelerated decline of the black family structure such as 1) The advancement of technology lessening the need for manual labor to more technical know-how labor; and 2) The women's rights movement in general opened up employment positions increasing competition, especially from white women, in many non-traditional areas which skilled blacks may have contributed to maintain their family structure in the midst of the rise of the cost of living.

=== Decline of black marriages ===
The rate of African American marriage is consistently lower than White Americans, and is declining. These trends are so pervasive that families who are married are considered a minority family structure for black people. In 1970, 64% of adult African Americans were married. This rate was cut in half by 2004, when it was 32%. In 2004, 45% of African Americans had never been married compared to only 25% of White Americans.

While research has shown that marriage rates have dropped for African Americans, the birth rate has not. Thus, the number of single-parent homes has risen dramatically for black women. One reason for the low rates of African American marriages is high age of first marriage for many African Americans. For African American women, the marriage rate increases with age compared to White Americans who follow the same trends but marry at younger ages than African Americans.

One study found that the average age of marriage for black women with a high school degree was 21.8 years compared to 20.8 years for white women. Fewer labor force opportunities and a decline in real earnings for black males since 1960 are also recognized as sources of increasing marital instability. As some researchers argue, these two trends have led to a pool of fewer desirable male partners and thus resulted in more divorces.

One type of marriage that has declined is the shotgun marriage. This drop in rate is documented by the number of out-of-wedlock births that now commonly occur. Between 1965 and 1989, three-quarters of white out-of-wedlock births and three-fifths of black out-of-wedlock births could be explained by situations where the parents would have married in the past. This is because, prior to the 1970s, the norm was such that, should a couple have a pregnancy out of wedlock, marriage was inevitable. Cultural norms have since changed, giving women and men more agency to decide whether or when they should get married.

=== Rise in divorce rates ===
For African Americans who do marry, the rate of divorce is higher than White Americans. While the trend is the same for both African Americans and White Americans, with at least half of marriages for the two groups ending in divorce, the rate of divorce tends to be consistently higher for African Americans. African Americans also tend to spend less time married than White Americans. Overall, African Americans are married at a later age, spend less time married and are more likely to be divorced than White Americans.

The decline and low success rate of black marriages is crucial for study because many African Americans achieve a middle-class status through marriage and the likelihood of children growing up in poverty is tripled for those in single-parent rather than two-parent homes. Some researchers suggest that the reason for the rise in divorce rates is the increasing acceptability of divorces. The decline in social stigma of divorce has led to a decrease in the number of legal barriers of getting a divorce, thus making it easier for couples to divorce. In addition to social sanction, expanded access to legal institutions by poor communities, mainly brought about by the Neighborhood Legal Services Program (LSP) as part of the War on Poverty (1965), is seen as contributing, directly and indirectly, to changes in family structure flowing from the 1960s, in which marriage rates began to significantly decreased while divorces and nonmarital births increased.

=== Black male incarceration and mortality ===
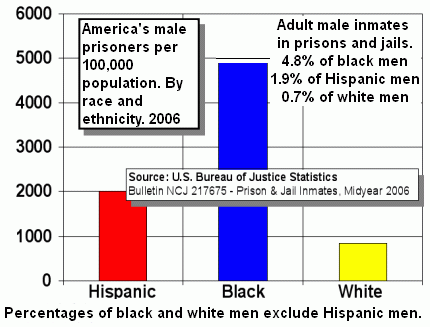
In 2006, an estimated 4.8% of Black non-Hispanic men were in prison or jail, compared to 1.9% of Hispanic men of any race and 0.7% of White non-Hispanic men. U.S. Bureau of Justice Statistics.

Structural barriers are often listed as the reason for the current trends in the African American family structure, specifically the decline in marriage rates. Imbalanced sex ratios have been cited as one of these barriers since the late nineteenth century, where census data shows that in 1984, there were 99 black males for every 100 black females within the population. 2003 census data shows there are 91 black males for every 100 females.

Black male incarceration and higher mortality rates are often pointed to for these imbalanced sex ratios. Although black males make up 6% of the population, they make up 50% of those who are incarcerated. This incarceration rate for black males increased by a rate of more than four between the years of 1980 and 2003. The incarceration rate for African American males is 3,045 out of 100,000 compared to 465 per 100,000 White American males. In many areas around the country, the chance that black males will be arrested and jailed at least once in their lifetime is extremely high. For Washington, DC, this probability was between 80 and 90% in 1999.

Because black males are incarcerated at six times the rate of white males, the skewed incarceration rates harm these black males as well as their families and communities. Incarceration can affect former inmates and their future in society long after they leave prison. Those that have been incarcerated lose masculinity, as incarceration can affect a man's confirmation of his identity as a father. After being released from prison, efforts to reestablish or sustain connections and be active within the family are often unsuccessful.

Incarceration can be damaging to familial ties and can have a negative effect on family relations and a man's sense of masculinity. In 34 states, those who are on parole or probation are not allowed to vote, and in 12 states a felony conviction means never voting again. A criminal record affects one's ability to secure federal benefits or get a job, as one Northwestern University study found that blacks with a criminal record were the least likely to be called back for a job interview in a comparison of black and white applicants.

Incarceration has been associated with a higher risk of disease, increased likelihood of smoking cigarettes, and premature death, impacting these former inmates and their ability to be normalized in society. This further impacts social structure, as studies show that paternal incarceration may contribute to children's behavioral problems and lower performance in school. Also, the female partners of male inmates are more likely to suffer from depression and struggle economically. These effects contribute to the barriers impacting the African American family structure.

The mortality rates for African American males are also typically higher than they are for African American females. Between 1980 and 2003, 4,744 to 27,141 more African American males died annually than African American females. This higher incarceration rate and mortality rate helps to explain the low marriage rates for many African American females who cannot find black partners.

== Implications ==
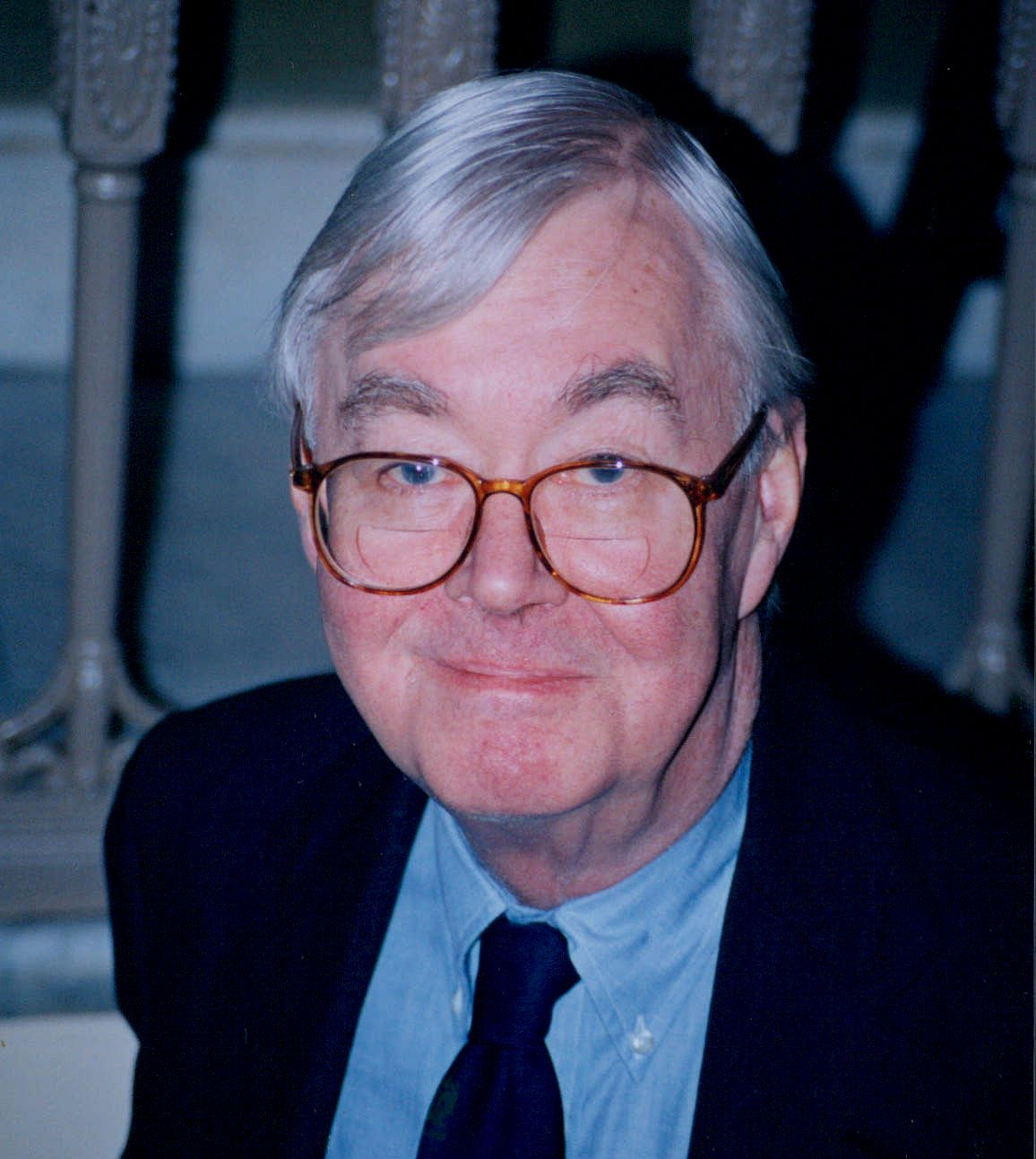
New York's late Senator Daniel Patrick Moynihan, photographed in 1998.

The Moynihan Report, written by Assistant Secretary of Labor, Daniel Patrick Moynihan, initiated the debate on whether the African-American family structure leads to negative outcomes, such as poverty, teenage pregnancy and gaps in education or whether the reverse is true and the African American family structure is a result of institutional discrimination, poverty and other segregation. Regardless of the causality, researchers have found a consistent relationship between the current African American family structure and poverty, education, and pregnancy. According to C. Eric Lincoln, the Negro family's "enduring sickness" is the absent father from the African-American family structure.

C. Eric Lincoln also suggests that the implied American idea that poverty, teen pregnancy, and poor education performance has been the struggle for the African-American community is due to the absent African-American father. According to the Moynihan Report, the failure of a male dominated subculture, which only exist in the African-American culture, and reliance on the matriarchal control has been greatly present in the African-American family structure for the past three centuries. This absence of the father, or "mistreatment", has resulted in the African-American crime rate being higher than the National average, African-American drug addiction being higher than whites, and rates of illegitimacy being at least 25% or higher than whites. A family needs the presence of both parents for the youth to "learn the values and expectations of society."

=== Poverty ===
Black single-parent homes headed by women still demonstrate how relevant the feminization of poverty is. Black women often work in low-paying and female-dominated occupations. Black women also make up a large percentage of poverty-afflicted people. Additionally, the racialization of poverty in combination with its feminization creates further hindrances for youth growing up black, in single-parent homes, and in poverty. For married couple families in 2007, there was a 5.8% poverty rate.

This number, however, varied when considering race so that 5.4% of all white people, 9.7% of black people, and 14.9% of all Hispanic people lived in poverty. These numbers increased for single-parent homes, with 26.6% of all single-parent families living in poverty, 22.5% of all white single-parent people, 44.0% of all single-parent black people, and 33.4% of all single-parent Hispanic people living in poverty.

While majority opinion tends to center on the increase in poverty as a result of single-parent homes, research has shown that this is not always the case. In one study examining the effects of single-parent homes on parental stress and practices, the researchers found that family structure and marital status were not as big a factor as poverty and the experiences the mothers had while growing up. Furthermore, the authors found little parental dysfunction in parenting styles and efficacy for single-mothers, suggesting that two-parent homes are not always the only type of successful family structures. The authors suggest that focus should also be placed on the poverty that African Americans face as a whole, rather than just those who live in single-parent homes and those who are of the typical African American family structure.

=== Educational performance ===
There is consensus in the literature about the negative consequences of growing up in single-parent homes on educational attainment and success. Children growing up in single-parent homes are more likely to not finish school and generally obtain fewer years of schooling than those in two-parent homes. Specifically, boys growing up in homes with only their mothers are more likely to receive poorer grades and display behavioral problems.

For black high school students, the African American family structure also affects their educational goals and expectations. Studies on the topic have indicated that children growing up in single-parent homes face disturbances in young childhood, adolescence and young adulthood as well. Although these effects are sometimes minimal and contradictory, it is generally agreed that the family structure a child grows up in is important for their success in the educational sphere. This is particularly important for African American children who have a 50% chance of being born outside of marriages and growing up in a home with a single-parent.

Some arguments for the reasoning behind this drop in attainment for single-parent homes point to the socioeconomic problems that arise from mother-headed homes. Particularly relevant for families centered on black matriarchy, one theory posits that the reason children of female-headed households do worse in education is because of the economic insecurity that results because of single motherhood. Single parent mothers often have lower incomes and thus may be removed from the home and forced to work more hours, and are sometimes forced to move into poorer neighborhoods with fewer educational resources.

Other theories point to the importance of male role models and fathers in particular, for the development of children emotionally and cognitively, especially boys. Even for fathers who may not be in the home, studies have shown that time spent with fathers has a positive relationship with psychological well-being including less depression and anxiety. Additionally, emotional support from fathers is related to fewer delinquency problems and lower drug and marijuana use.

=== Teen pregnancy ===
Teenage and unplanned pregnancies pose threats for those who are affected by them with these unplanned pregnancies leading to greater divorce rates for young individuals who marry after having a child. In one study, 60% of the young married parents had separated within the first five years of marriage. Additionally, as reported in one article, unplanned pregnancies are often cited as a reason for young parents dropping out, resulting in greater economic burdens and instabilities for these teenage parents later on.

Another study found that paternal attitudes towards sexuality and sexual expression at a young age were more likely to determine sexual behaviors by teens regardless of maternal opinions on the matter. For these youths, the opinions of the father affected their behaviors in positive ways, regardless of whether the parent lived in or out of the home and the age of the student. Another study looking at how mother–daughter relationships affect teenage pregnancy found that negative parental relationships led to teenage daughters dating later, getting pregnant earlier, and having more sex partners.

Teens who lived in a married family have been shown to have a lower risk for teenage pregnancy. Teenage girls in single-parent families were six times more likely to get pregnant and 2.8 times more likely to engage in sex at an earlier age than girls in married family homes.

== Criticism and support ==
=== Cosby and Poussaint's criticism of the single-parent family ===
Bill Cosby has criticized the current state of single-parenting dominating black family structure. In a speech to the NAACP in 2004, Cosby said, "In the neighborhood that most of us grew up in, parenting is not going on. You have the pile-up of these sweet beautiful things born by nature—raised by no one."

In Cosby's 2007 book Come On People: On the Path from Victims to Victors, co-authored with psychiatrist Alvin Poussaint, Cosby and Poussaint write that "A house without a father is a challenge," and that "A neighborhood without fathers is a catastrophe." Cosby and Poussaint write that mothers "have difficulty showing a son how to be a man," and that this presents a problem when there are no father figures around to show boys how to channel their natural aggressiveness in constructive ways. Cosby and Poussaint also write, "We wonder if much of these kids' rage was born when their fathers abandoned them."

Cosby and Poussaint state that verbal and emotional abuse of the children is prominent in the parenting style of some black single mothers, with serious developmental consequences for the children. "Words like 'You're stupid,' 'You're an idiot,' 'I'm sorry you were born,' or 'You'll never amount to anything' can stick a dagger in a child's heart." "Single mothers angry with men, whether their current boyfriends or their children's fathers, regularly transfer their rage to their sons, since they're afraid to take it out on the adult males" Cosby and Poussaint write that this formative parenting environment in the black single parent family leads to a "wounded anger—of children toward parents, women toward men, men toward their mothers and women in general".

== Policy proposals ==
Authors Angela Hattery and Earl Smith have proffered solutions to addressing the high rate of black children being born out of wedlock. Three of Hattery and Smith's solutions focus on parental support for children, equal access to education, and alternatives to incarceration for nonviolent offenders. According to Hattery and Smith, African-American families are within a system that is "pitted" against them and there are some institutional solutions and individual solutions that America and its citizens can do to reduce implications associated with the African-American family structure.

=== Parental support for children ===
According to Hattery and Smith, around 50% of African-American children are poor because they are dependent on a single mother. In states like Wisconsin, for a child to be the recipient of welfare or receive the "bride fare", their parents must be married. Hattery acknowledges one truth about this law, which is that it recognizes that a child is "entitled" to the financial and emotional support of both parents. One of Hattery and Smith's solutions is found around the idea that an African-American child is entitled to the financial and emotional support of both parents. The government does require the noncustodial parents to pay a percentage to their child every month, but according to Hattery the only way this will help eliminate child poverty is if these policies are actively enforced.

=== Education equality ===
For the past 400 years of America's life many African-Americans have been denied the proper education needed to provide for the traditional American family structure. Hattery suggests that the schools and education resources available to most African-Americans are under-equipped and unable provide their students with the knowledge needed to be college ready. In 2005 The Manhattan Institute for Policy Research report showed that even though integration has been a push more recently, over the past 15 years there has been a 13% decline in integration in public schools.

These same reports also show that in 2002, 56% of African-American students graduated from high school with a diploma, while 78% of white students graduated. If students do not feel they are learning, they will not continue to go to school. This conclusion is made from the Manhattan Institute for Policy Research report that stated only 23% of African-American students who graduated from public high school felt college-ready. Hatterly suggests that the government invest into the African-American family by investing in the African-American children's education. A solution is found in providing the same resources provided to schools that are predominantly white. According to Hatterly, through education equality the African-American family structure can increase opportunities to prosper with equality in employment, wages, and health insurance.

=== Alternatives to incarceration ===
According to Hattery and Smith 25–33% of African-American men are spending time in jail or prison and according to Thomas, Krampe, and Newton 28% of African-American children do not live with any father representative. According to Hatterly, the government can stop this situation that many African-American children experience due to the absence of their father. Hatterly suggests probation or treatment (for alcohol or drugs) as alternatives to incarceration. Incarceration not only continues the negative assumption of the African-American family structure, but perpetuates poverty, single parenthood, and the separation of family units.

== See also ==
Publications:

- Is Marriage for White People?: How the African American Marriage Decline Affects Everyone

General:

- African American culture
- Family structure in the United States
- Feminization of poverty
- African Americans and birth control
- Black genocide
- Japanese family structure
- Interracial marriage in the United States
- Single parents in the United States
- Baby mama
- Hispanic family structure
