= Jennifer Eberhardt =

American psychologist

Jennifer L. Eberhardt
- Born: 1965 (age 60–61); Cleveland, Ohio
- Occupations: Psychologist; professor
- Spouse: Ralph Richard Banks
- Awards: MacArthur Fellowship; Lewis Thomas Prize (2022)

Academic background
- Education: PhD 1993 (Harvard University); AM 1990 (Harvard University); BA 1987 (University of Cincinnati)
- Thesis: Where the invisible meets the obvious: The effects of stereotyping biases on the fundamental attribution error (1993)

Academic work
- Discipline: Psychology
- Sub-discipline: Social psychology
- Main interests: Racial bias in criminal justice
- Notable works: Biased: Uncovering the Hidden Prejudice That Shapes What We See, Think, and Do

Jennifer Lynn Eberhardt (born May 29, 1965) is an American social psychologist who is currently a professor in the Department of Psychology at Stanford University. Eberhardt has been responsible for major contributions on investigating the consequences of the psychological association between race and crime through methods such as field studies and laboratory studies. She has also contributed to research on unconscious bias, including demonstrating how racial imagery and judgment affect culture and society within the domain of social justice. The results from her work have contributed to training law enforcement officers and state agencies to better their judgments through implicit bias training. She has also provided directions for future research in this domain and brought attention to mistreatment in communities due to biases.

Eberhardt has authored Biased: Uncovering the Hidden Prejudice That Shapes What We See, Think, and Do, was a recipient of the 2014 MacArthur "Genius Grant" Fellowship, been named one of Foreign Policy's 100 Leading Global Thinkers, and has been elected to the National Academy of Sciences and the American Academy of Arts and Sciences.

In 2023, she was elected to the American Philosophical Society.

== Early life ==
Eberhardt was born in Cleveland, Ohio, and is the youngest of five children. She was raised in Lee–Harvard, a predominantly African-American middle-class neighborhood. When she was twelve, her family relocated to Beachwood, Ohio, where she graduated from Beachwood High School.

Eberhardt credits her interest in race and inequality on her family's move from the predominantly African-American working-class neighbourhood of Lee-Harvard to the white suburb of Beachwood. The two neighbourhoods differed in terms of resources and opportunities despite their close proximity. She noticed that she and her non African-American classmates experienced life differently, such as her father and brothers being pulled over more frequently than other residents. This further increased her interest in racial inequality and changed her approach to understanding the world.

== Education ==
After graduating from Beachwood High School, she received her BA from the University of Cincinnati in 1987. She then attended Harvard University where she received her MA in 1990 and PhD in 1993. She is married to Ralph Richard Banks, a law professor at Stanford University. Eberhardt and Banks were elementary schoolmates who reconnected at Harvard. They currently reside in the San Francisco Bay Area with their three sons.

== Career ==
From July 1993 to July 1994, Eberhardt was a postdoctoral research associate in the Social and Personality Psychology Division at the University of Massachusetts. Here, she conducted research on stereotyping and inter-group relations. She was a postdoctoral research associate in the Department of Psychology at Stanford University, from September 1994 to June 1995, where she researched the impact of stereotype threat on academic performance. From July 1995 to June 1998, Eberhardt worked as an assistant professor at Yale University in the Department of Psychology and the Department of African Studies and African-American Studies. In September 1998, she accepted a teaching position at Stanford University in the Department of Psychology as an assistant professor. In May 2005, she was appointed as an associate professor, and at some point she became a full professor. Eberhardt is also the co-director and faculty co-founder of Stanford's SPARQ (Social Psychological Answers to Real-World Questions) program. This center at Stanford brings together many industry leaders, researchers and well known faces in society to inspire cultural changes using insights from the behavioral sciences. Through SPARQ, Eberhardt demonstrates the consequences of racial associations in criminal justice, education and business.

== Research ==
=== Implicit bias ===
Eberhardt and her colleagues developed research that introduced alternative approaches to considering race and ethnicity. In 2008, she published a study that sought to examine how the variations in beliefs regarding the root of racial differences can impact social interactions. The study's findings revealed that those who believed racial differences arise due to biological differences differed from those who looked at race as a social construct. Those who view racial differences as biologically influenced are, according to this study, less likely to express interest in interracial relationships. These people were also at a higher risk of promoting race-based stereotypes, were less likely to set aside inequalities and defended these inequalities as a product of innate racial differences. When people perceive racial differences as biologically determined, they create strict barriers between themselves and racial out-groups. This impacts the well-being of members of historically disadvantaged racial groups.

Golby and Eberhardt's research focused on why humans are more likely to recognize people in their own race over those in another race. African-American and European-American subjects looked at images of unfamiliar African-American and European-American faces while getting fMRI scans. There was 1.5 times more activation in the right hemisphere of the brain, specifically the fusiform face areas (FFAs), when looking at same-race faces. Another finding was that memory recognition was greater for recognizing same-race faces in European-Americans which showed higher activation in the left fusiform cortex and the right hippocampal and parahippocampal regions. This demonstrates that own- and other-race faces stimulate differential activation in the FFAs, however it does not explain why activation for same-race faces takes place in right side of the brain and memory encoding takes place in the left side of the brain. This can be an area for future research.

=== Criminal justice ===
Eberhardt's research demonstrated how the automatic effect of implicit racial stereotypes impacts one's visual processing. A series of studies focusing on priming were conducted, specifically priming individuals with images related to crime. The intention was to see whether individuals would focus on White or Black faces when cued for crime. The study showed that people and officers specifically focused more on Black faces. The next study focused solely on officers who were separated into two groups, those who were primed for crime and those who weren't. They were presented with a picture of a Black or White suspect and were asked to complete a memory task where they had to identify the suspect in a lineup with other suspects of the same race. Some lineups had suspects with highly stereotypical features of each respective race, whereas others had less stereotypical facial features. Crime-primed officers who viewed a Black suspect misremembered the suspect with someone who had more stereotypical Black features; but crime primed officers who saw a White suspect were less likely to identify a less stereotypical White suspect and more likely to associate it with a more stereotypical Black face. Eberhardt's research shows how racial associations can impact the public's perception of Black people and crime and how this can influence how White people would misremember or neglect evidence that isn't accurate for a Black defendant. This also introduces future directions for research such as the cognitive accessibility of primed information.

In a 2006 study, Eberhardt and her colleagues examined databases in Philadelphia which examined whether the likelihood of being sentenced to death is related to the defendant looking stereotypically Black (thick lips, dark skin, dark hair, broad noses) when the victim was either Black or White. Those who were stereotypically Black were sentenced to death 57.5 percent of the time compared to 24.4 percent of the lighter African-Americans, especially if the victims were White. This research provides evidence that physical traits alone can influence sentencing decisions to quite an extent.

In a related 2008 study, Eberhardt and her colleagues conducted an analysis on printed newspaper articles regarding Caucasian and African-American convicts in line for the death penalty. This study was rooted in the notion that African-American males are frequently wrongly accused, misjudged and wrongfully remembered as aggressors. During the analysis of the newspaper articles, the researchers' main focus was on detecting "ape imagery" (this included characterizing a person as a beast, hairy, wild). They found this imagery was significantly more common for African-Americans than Caucasians. In the case of African-Americans, the ape imagery also predicted who would be sentenced to the death penalty. The research done by Eberhardt demonstrated not only the mistreatment of African-American detainees, but also the lack of civil rights available to members of other lower-status groups who are often misjudged as aggressors.

In 2012, Eberhardt and colleagues studied how racial stereotypes can affect a juror's perception of the legal distinction between a juvenile and adult criminal offender. Participants read non-homicide case studies depicting either a Black or White juvenile offender. They found White Americans were more likely to support severe sentences when they read case studies depicting a Black juvenile offender than when the offender's race was changed to White. This was because white offenders' behaviour was more likely to be attributed to youthful indiscretion while Black offenders were more likely to be perceived as having the maturity and criminal intentions of adults.

In another study in 2014, Eberhardt and Hetey (a Stanford University colleague) examined how just the mere exposure of racial disparities can impact an individual's support for harsh criminal justice policies. White participants were split into two groups, in group one they watched a video clip in which 25 percent of the images were of Black inmates and in group two, 45 percent of the images were of Black inmates. They were then informed of strict criminal laws abiding in the state of California, followed by a petition form to sign to amend the laws and make them less harsh. From group one, more than 50 percent of the participants signed the petition, whereas only 28 percent of group two agreed to sign it.

In 2015, the Oakland Police Department committed to participate in President Barack Obama's Police Data Initiative. Through SPARQ, Eberhardt worked with the Oakland Police Department to analyze police stop data for racial disparities. They used computational linguistics to assess interactions between officers and members of the Oakland community. Although they found no explicit bias, they found that when speaking to white drivers, officers were reassuring, used positive words, and expressed concern for safety. In contrast, when officers were speaking to Black drivers, they more often used negative terms, stuttered, used informal language, and used less explanatory terms. The researchers made fifty recommendations for critical changes within the Oakland Police Department, many of which have been implemented as of the report's 2017 release. The recommendations create a model that spans four categories: data analysis, policies and practices, training, and community engagement. As of 2017, Eberhardt and her team have since given bias training to ninety percent of the Oakland Police Department's officers.

=== Bias in the education system ===
Okonofua and Eberhardt (2015) examined teachers' responses to students' misbehaviors, and whether there were racial differences in how these responses were directed. The study discovered teachers' responses contributed to racial disparities in discipline in the sense that Black students are more likely to be labeled as "troublemakers" than White students. It was also found that when students of color and White students commit similar behaviors, the behaviors are viewed as being more serious for students of color. Black students' misbehaviors are more likely to be viewed as a pattern than White students. The study also found that responses given by teachers may potentially drive racial differences in students' behaviors.

In 2016, Okonofua, Walton, and Eberhardt ran a meta-analysis on past research literature examining how social-psychological factors play a role in the structure of racial disparities in teacher-student relationships. Findings in the research suggest pervasive negative stereotypes may give rise to mistrustful relationships between racially stigmatized students and teachers. For example, in instances where Black students are often given the label of 'troublemakers', students may feel stigmatized and have distrust for teachers, thus they are more likely to misbehave in the future. As a result, such teachers' interactions with students through frequent labelling can potentially produce a never-ending cycle of increased punishment and misbehaviors. Due to such issue, a discipline gap is produced, which results in Black students having less opportunity to learn. The meta-analysis also noted an approach that has been implemented in over 7000 schools in the U.S. called the Positive Behavior Interventions and Supports approach (PBIS), the authors argued although the approach aims to improve students' behavior, the subject of positive teacher-student relationship is neglected. Therefore, future interventions should aim to solve psychological barriers in order to reinforce positive teacher-student relationships rather than placing the majority of emphasis on teaching social skills, or prescriptive rules.

== Awards and recognition ==
Awards received by Eberhardt
Year	Award	Notes	Refs
1995	National Academy of Education Spencer Postdoctoral Fellowship	Awarded for active contributions and efforts in researching prejudice and discrimination faced by Black students in academic settings.	
September 1995 – June 1996	Irvine Postdoctoral Teaching Fellowship		
1997	Junior Faculty Fellowship at Yale University		
2002	Distinguished Alumnae Award at the University of Cincinnati		
2003–2004	Junior Faculty Professional Development Award at the Research Institute of Comparative Studies in Race and Ethnicity (RICSRE) of Stanford University		
2005–2006	Residential Fellow – Center for Advanced Study in the Behavioral Sciences at Stanford, CA		
2006–2007	Gordon and Pattie Faculty Fellow at Stanford University in the School of Humanities and Sciences		
2006–2007; 2010–2011	Dean's Award for Distinguished Achievements in Teaching at Stanford University		
2010–2011	Clayman Institute for Gender Research at the Faculty Research Fellow at Stanford University		
2012–2013	Institute for Research in the Social Sciences (IRiSS) Faculty Fellow at Stanford University		
2014	MacArthur Fellowship from the John D. and Catherine T. MacArthur Foundation		
2017	Cozzarelli Prize from the Proceedings of the National Academy of Sciences of the United States of America	Awarded to her 2017 research team for outstanding contribution to their field.	
2018	Robert B. Cialdini Prize from the Society for Personality and Social Psychology	Awarded to her 2017 research team for outstanding contribution to the field by showing social relevance using field methods.	
