= Ralph Richard Banks =

American lawyer

- Born: Ralph Richard Banks; December 11, 1964 (age 61); Cleveland, Ohio
- Occupations: Law professor Author
- Spouse: Jennifer Eberhardt

Academic background
- Education: Stanford University; Harvard Law School

Ralph Richard Banks (born December 11, 1964) is a professor at Stanford Law School, where he has taught since 1998. He also teaches at the Stanford Graduate School of Education. His scholarship focuses on race, inequality and the law. He published the book Is Marriage for White People?: How the African American Marriage Decline Affects Everyone in 2011.

== Early life and education ==
Ralph Richard Banks grew up in Cleveland, Ohio, and graduated from University School in 1983. He then enrolled at Stanford University, where he received both bachelor's and master's degrees in 1987. He received his J.D. degree, cum laude, from Harvard Law School in 1994.

After graduating from Stanford, Banks wrote regularly about race, culture, and inequality for a wide array of newspapers, including The New York Times, the Los Angeles Times, the Chicago Tribune, The Plain Dealer (Cleveland, Ohio), the Detroit Free Press, The Detroit News, The Atlanta Journal-Constitution, the St. Louis Post-Dispatch, The Denver Post, and the San Francisco Chronicle, among others.

After graduating from law school, Banks practiced law at the San Francisco office of O'Melveny & Myers. He is a member of the California Bar.

== Academic career ==
After leaving private practice, Banks served as the Reginald F. Lewis Fellow at Harvard Law School, where he wrote "The Color of Desire: Fulfilling Adoptive Parents' Racial Preferences Through Discriminatory State Action." The article subsequently appeared in the Yale Law Journal.

Following his fellowship, Banks clerked for the Honorable Barrington D. Parker Jr., of the Second Circuit Court of Appeals.

Banks' research addresses issues related to race and inequality across a variety of domains, from criminal justice, to employment, to the family. He has written and lectured widely in these areas. Professor Banks teaches family law, employment discrimination law, race and law, and the Fourteenth Amendment. He has been a visiting professor at Harvard Law School and the University of Virginia Law School. His scholarly writings have appeared in the Yale Law Journal, the Stanford Law Review, the Harvard Civil Rights-Civil Liberties Law Review, the Stanford Journal of Civil Rights and Civil Liberties, the Vanderbilt Law Review, the UCLA Law Review, the California Law Review, the Cornell Law Review, and many others. He is an editorial board member of the Law & Society Review.

== Courses taught ==
- Constitutional Law II: The Fourteenth Amendment
- Employment Discrimination
- Equal Protection and Antidiscrimination Law
- Family Law

== Personal life ==
Ralph Richard Banks lives with his wife, Jennifer Eberhardt, a prominent social psychologist, Stanford University faculty member and Macarthur Grant awardee, and their three children (Everett, Ebbie, and Harlan) in the San Francisco Bay Area.
