= Is Marriage for White People? =

2011 book by Ralph Richard Banks

- Author: Ralph Richard Banks
- Language: English
- Publisher: Dutton
- Publication date: 2011
- Publication place: United States
- Media type: Print
- ISBN: 978-0-525-95201-5
- OCLC: 635459419

Is Marriage for White People?: How the African American Marriage Decline Affects Everyone is a non-fiction book by Ralph Richard Banks, a writer and Stanford Law School professor. He concludes that "single is the new black", which poses serious problems for the African-American community. He recommends that black women open themselves up to be willing to enter serious relationships with men of other races and backgrounds, and he argues that it will improve black men and women alike.

== Contents ==
Banks states that for African-American women, it is considered the norm to go through life unmarried and to raise children as a single mother. Specially, he notes the statistics that nine in ten black women married in the 1950s while three in ten currently do so. He writes that this is largely because those women will not consider dating men of other races besides their own. He states that Asian and Latino women marry men of other races three times more than black women.

He writes about a variety of specific reasons that black women are so uninterested. He states that many women prefer the cultural "swagger" that they perceive only in black men, whereas other women idealize their fathers and can't imagine marrying a man who is particularly different. He recounts that some black women believe that non-black men are simply uninterested in them. He views this as important but partly dismisses it, citing a 2009 University of California–Irvine study of OkCupid that found that some men of other races respond to black women's profiles at higher rates than black men.

He views the aforementioned trend as a serious problem for African Americans in general since this prevents solid, nuclear families from forming that strengthen both the parents and the children. Banks criticizes feminists who believe that women forgoing marriage and raising children on their own is inherently good and represents a victory against retrograde patriarchy. He states that people's desire to find a life-time partner to be intimate with is innate across race and culture, and he recounts that the black women without romantic success feel depressed, not elated.

He writes, "If fears of interracial intimacy keep people separate now, it is because those fears embody the echo of the past. Many of us continue to act out the roles we first began to inhabit long ago. We scarcely stop to consider that we might change the script."

== Critical response ==
Is Marriage For White People? received mostly strong reviews upon publication. Wrote Imani Perry for The New York Times:

Banks doesn't offer a jeremiad about the decline of black family values in the way of so many others who do little more than regurgitate Daniel Patrick Moynihan's 1965 report, "The Negro Family: The Case for National Action," which described black family structure as "a tangle of pathology." Refreshingly, Banks offers a well-researched and probing discussion of why marriage rates are so low among black Americans ... And as a statement of values, Banks's position is laudable: people should be open to forming relationships across ethnic lines in a heterogeneous society; after all, romantic love is serendipitous — it doesn't neatly comport with expectations. But given that Banks identifies a devastating social reality for black men as the foremost explanation for low African-American marriage rates, you might expect a logical first-order solution to address that reality. Attention to the abundant research on the discrimination faced by black men in schools, in the workplace and in the realm of law enforcement would have been useful here. A solution to the marriage question rooted in dating preferences treats the problem as an individual one rather than as societal or structural, which seems odd in a book about such a fundamental social institution.

Alice Short of the Los Angeles Times wrote that "it's the first 180 pages of the book — the journey — that make "Marriage" a must-read for anyone who has an interest in understanding race relations in the United States."

== See also ==
- Waiting to Exhale, a film about romantic longing that Banks cites
- Moynihan Report
- African-American family structure
