= Hispanic family structure =

Hispanic Family Structure refers to the traditional and contemporary familial arrangements, cultural values, and social norms commonly found among Hispanic or Latino communities in the United States. While it has been noted that there is significant heterogeneity and variation among the Hispanic population across countries, regions, and socioeconomic backgrounds, many Hispanic families share common cultural themes including strong kinship bonds, respect for elders, intergenerational support, and traditional gender roles.

== Cultural foundations ==
Hispanic family life is deeply rooted in a collectivist culture that emphasizes family unity, loyalty, and interconnectedness. The concept of familismo—a cultural belief in the importance of family ties and obligations—is central. In many Hispanic cultures, family is considered a primary source of identity and support, extending beyond the nuclear family to include grandparents, aunts, uncles, cousins, and even close family friends. A similarly significant culturally traditional value in many latin-american cultures and families is respeto. This concept of respect, particularly for one's elders, influences both behaviors between generations and individuals, and also aids in the further establishment of individual roles. This also contributes to the long term care of the elderly by family caregivers and multigenerational homes.

While many Hispanic families in the United States remain connected to and influenced by their cultural beliefs and values, acculturation does appear to play an impact on family values and composition. Some studies have shown that acculturation can be connected to a decrease in family cohesion. Many families, especially families with second generation children born in the United States, are impacted by both acculturation and enculturation. Acculturation, the acquisition of dominant US culture, often promotes a deterioration in familism and cohesion. Contrarily, enculturation- or the acquisition and learning of one’s heritage, traditions, and cultural practices & values- leads to the strengthening of familism values and familial cohesion.

== Family roles ==
In traditional Hispanic family structure, family roles are often clearly defined and deeply rooted in cultural traditions, with strong emphasis on respect, unity, and hierarchy. These roles are influenced by social, religious, and historical factors, and while they vary across countries and generations, traditional expectations around gender and age often remain significant. Family members are typically expected to contribute to the collective wellbeing, with elders often playing an authoritative role and younger members expected to show deference and obedience.

=== Gender roles ===
==== Traditional gender roles ====
Traditional gender roles in Hispanic families often follow a patriarchal model, where men and women are expected to fulfill different duties within the household. Men are generally seen as the primary providers and protectors, while women are often expected to manage domestic responsibilities and nurture the family. These roles are reinforced by cultural ideals such as machismo and marianismo, however, these beliefs and roles have evolved in many households due to modernization, migration, and changing societal norms.

Traditionally, Machismo emphasizes traits such as strength, dominance, and authority in men, and it often encourages male leadership within the family. Marianismo, in contrast, is a cultural ideal based on the Virgin Mary, promoting values like purity, self-sacrifice, and devotion in women. While these ideals continue to shape expectations in some families, modern dynamics are increasingly flexible, especially among younger and U.S.-born Hispanics, who may adopt more egalitarian practices, influenced by cultural shifts influenced by movements including the Chicana Feminist Movement.

==== Evolving gender roles ====
Evolving gender roles within Hispanic families reflect broader social changes influenced by immigration, acculturation, education, and shifting economic demands. While traditional gender expectations such as male dominance and responsibility and female self-sacrifice and virtue still persist in some communities, these roles are increasingly being redefined—especially among younger generations and in more urban or U.S.-based contexts.

One notable shifts has been the increased participation of Hispanic women in higher education and the workforce. This has led to a growing number of dual-income households and a rebalancing of domestic responsibilities. Many Hispanic women are co-providers or primary breadwinners, prompting a renegotiation of traditional household dynamics. In turn, some Hispanic men are taking on more active roles in childrearing and domestic life, challenging the conventional ideals of male stoicism and authority associated with machismo. Additionally, studies have shown that the majority of Latino men do not identify with the stereotypical idea of rigid and controlling machismo.

Cultural shifts have also opened space for discussions around gender equality, mental health, and emotional expression—areas that were historically stigmatized or gendered. While resistance to changing roles still exists, especially in more conservative or rural settings, evolving norms have created more flexible family structures that better accommodate modern realities.

=== Children ===
Children are typically raised to show deference to parents and elders, to contribute to household responsibilities, and to maintain strong ties to immediate and extended family members. These expectations reflect the collectivist orientation common in many Hispanic cultures, where a child's behavior is seen as reflective of the family’s values and reputation. Even from a young age, children may take on roles that support the family—such as caring for siblings, translating for non-English-speaking parents (in immigrant households), or assisting in family businesses.

Parental involvement is often characterized by protective and authoritative parenting styles, emphasizing obedience, guidance, and close emotional bonds. As children mature, they may continue to live with parents longer than in many non-Hispanic white families, with multi-generational living arrangements being common, especially in economically constrained or newly immigrated households.

Despite the strong influence of tradition, shifts have occurred due to factors such as immigration, acculturation, and exposure to more individualistic societal norms. U.S.-born Hispanic children may experience tensions between familial expectations and mainstream cultural values, particularly regarding independence and decision-making. While many latino youth encounter acculturation and enculturation, there is an increased risk of depression for latino teenagers, particularly girls, associated with acculturation.

== Family composition ==
Family composition in Hispanic communities reflects a blend of traditional values and practical adaptations to social, economic, and migratory conditions. While the nuclear family remains a common unit, extended and multigenerational family structures are also widespread and culturally significant. These configurations emphasize interconnectedness, mutual support, and collective identity. Family composition may also shift depending on immigration patterns, socioeconomic status, and generational differences, resulting in a variety of household structures across Hispanic communities.

=== Multigenerational households ===
Multigenerational households— those consisting of three or more generations living under one roof— can be a common feature of Hispanic family life. These living arrangements are deeply rooted in cultural norms that emphasize familial responsibility, elder respect, and communal caregiving. In many Hispanic families, grandparents often serve as caretakers for children, contribute to household finances, or offer cultural and linguistic continuity, particularly in immigrant households. Additionally, older Hispanic individuals are more likely to have family caregivers instead of external help than non-Hispanic whites as they age.

This model not only reinforces intergenerational bonds but also provides practical benefits. Economic pressures, such as housing costs and the need for childcare or eldercare, have further encouraged multigenerational living. In immigrant families, co-residence with extended kin can ease the transition to a new country, providing social and emotional support. Multigenerational households are especially prevalent in Mexican-American and Central American communities in the U.S., though they are present across various Hispanic national-origin groups. The practice tends to persist more strongly among foreign-born Hispanics but is also present, to a lesser extent, among U.S.-born generations.

=== Extended and non-nuclear family structures ===
Beyond the traditional nuclear model, many Hispanic families maintain close relationships with a broader network of relatives. The extended family—including aunts, uncles, cousins, and even close family friends—often plays an active role in everyday life. This structure is supported by familismo, placing the needs of the family above those of the individual and fosters strong loyalty across generations and branches of the family tree. This broader family network supports both emotional and practical needs, functioning as a vital source of caregiving, financial assistance, and moral guidance, particularly in times of crisis or transition.

In some households, especially among immigrant families, extended relatives may live together or rotate between homes. Transnational families—where family members are spread across different countries—are also increasingly common due to immigration, with modern communication tools allowing for the continuation of close family bonds despite physical separation.

==== Compadrazgo ====
The practice of compadrazgo (godparenthood), found across Latin America and the Hispanic Caribbean, formalizes the involvement of non-biological caregivers in children's lives. Godparents play a symbolic and often functional role, contributing to children's religious, emotional, and social development. These ties create layered family networks that extend beyond bloodlines and remain significant in both immigrant and U.S.-born families.

== See also ==
- Hispanic Culture
- Latino
- Hispanic Americans
- Chicanismo
- Chicana Feminism
- Family in the United States
- African-American family structure
- Family values
