= Single parents in the United States =

Total number of single parents in the US over time from 1950 to 2020

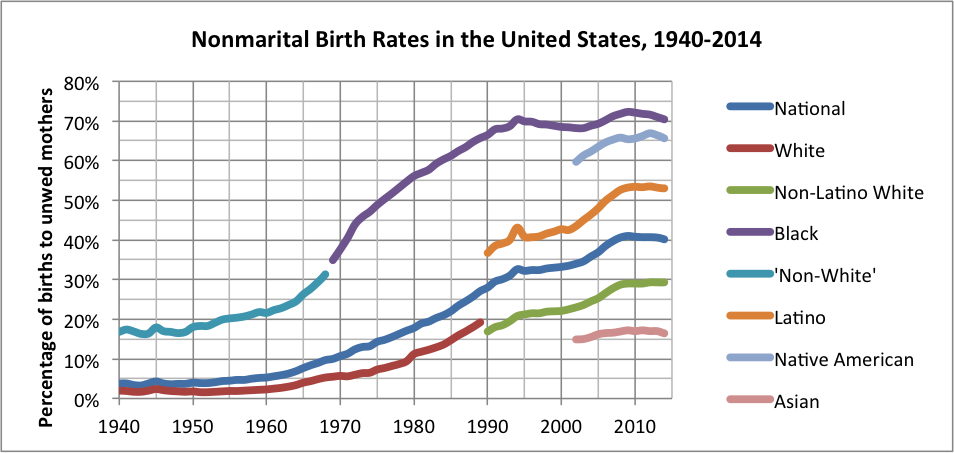
The out of wedlock birth rates by race in the United States from 1940 to 2014. The data is from the National Vital Statistics System Reports published by the CDC National Center for Health Statistics. Note: Prior to 1969, African Americans were included along with other minority groups as "Non-White."

Single parents in the United States have become more common since the second half of the 20th century.

In the United States, since the 1960s, there has been an increase in the number of children living with a single parent. The jump was caused by an increase in births to unmarried women and by the increasing prevalence of divorces among couples. In 2010, 40.7% of births in the US were to unmarried women. In 2000, 11% of children were living with parents who had never been married, 15.6% of children lived with a divorced parent, and 1.2% lived with a parent who was widowed.

The results of the 2010 United States census showed that 27% of children live with one parent, consistent with the emerging trend noted in 2000. The most recent data of December 2011 shows approximately 13.7 million single parents in the U.S. Mississippi leads the nation with the highest percent of births to unmarried mothers with 54% in 2014, followed by Louisiana, New Mexico, Florida and South Carolina.

In 2006, 12.9 million families in the US were headed by a single parent, 80% of which were headed by a female.

The newest census bureau reports that between 1960 and 2016, the percentage of children living in families with two parents decreased from 88 to 69. Of those 50.7 million children living in families with two parents, 47.7 million live with two married parents and 3.0 million live with two unmarried parents.

The percentage of children living with single parents increased substantially in the United States during the second half of the 20th century. According to a 2013 Child Trends study, only 9% of children lived with single parents in the 1960s—a figure that increased to 28% in 2012. The main cause of single parent families are high rates of divorce and non-marital childbearing.

According to a 2019 study from Pew Research Center, the United States has the world's highest rate of children living in single-parent households. According to a 2018 Pew Research study, 47% of Black children lived with a single mother, the highest of any racial group.

== Single mothers ==
In the United States, 80% of single parents are mothers. Among this percentage of single mothers: 45% of single mothers are currently divorced or separated, 1.7% are widowed, 34% of single mothers never have been married. This is in contrast to earlier decades, where having a child outside of marriage and/or being a single mother was not prominent. Census information from 1960 tells us that in that year, only nine percent of children lived in single parent families. Today four out of every ten children are born to an unwed mother.

The prevalence of single mothers as primary caregiver is a part of traditional parenting trends between mothers and fathers. Data supports these claims, showing that in comparison to men, women are doing more than two-thirds of all child caring and in some cases one hundred percent. Of approximately 11 million single-parent homes in 2020, more than 80 percent were headed by single mothers. This disproportionate statistic has been well-documented in multiple country contexts all around the world. The United States Census Bureau found that today, one in four children under the age of 18, a total of 17.4 million are being raised without a father at all. Women all around the world have been perpetually socialized to adhere to traditional gender roles that place the majority of responsibility for childcare upon them.

Income distribution among single parent households in the United States by gender compared to households with two married parents: Single parent households run by men Single parent households run by females Households run by married parents

The cultural definition of a mother's role contributes to the preference of mother as primary caregiver. The "motherhood mandate" describes the societal expectations that good mothers should be available to their children as much as possible. In addition to their traditional protective and nurturing role, single mothers may have to play the role of family provider as well; since men are the breadwinners of the traditional family, in the absence of the child support or social benefits the mother must fulfill this role whilst also providing adequate parentage.

Because of this dual role, in the United States, 80% of single mothers are employed, of which 50% are full-time workers and 30% are part-time. Many employed single mothers rely on childcare facilities to care for their children while they are away at work. Linked to the rising prevalence of single parenting is the increasing quality of health care, and there have been findings of positive developmental effects with modern childcare.

It is not uncommon that the mother will become actively involved with the childcare program as to compensate for leaving her children under the care of others. Working single mothers may also rely on the help from fictive kin, who provide for the children while the mother is at her job. All of these factors contribute to a well-documented heightened likelihood for single-parent, female-headed households to experience poverty.

Single mothers are one of the poorest populations, many of them vulnerable to homelessness. In the United States, nearly half (45%) of single mothers and their children live below the poverty line, also referred to as the poverty threshold. They lack the financial resources to support their children when the birth father is unresponsive. Many seek assistance through living with another adult, perhaps a relative, fictive kin, or significant other, and divorced mothers who remarry have fewer financial struggles than unmarried single mothers, who cannot work for longer periods of time without shirking their child-caring responsibilities. Unmarried mothers are thus more likely to cohabit with another adult. Many of the jobs worked by, or are available to women, are not sufficient and do not bring in enough income for the mother and her children; this is common in the United States and other countries all over the world.

According to a 2018 Pew Research study, 47% of Black children, 23% of Hispanic children, 13% of White children, and 7% of Asian children lived with a single mother. As a whole, 21% of children lived with a single mother, 4% with a single father, and 7% with cohabitating parents.

As of 2025, Black women have the highest labor force participation rate among women, with 61% in the labor force, compared to 58.7% among Hispanic women, 58.1% among Asian women, and 56.5% among White women. Black men had the lowest labor participation rate among men with 65.6% in the labor force, compared to 68.2% among White men, 72.8% among Asian men, and 75.1% among Hispanic men. The labor force participation gap between Black women and men was the smallest of any racial group.

== Single fathers ==
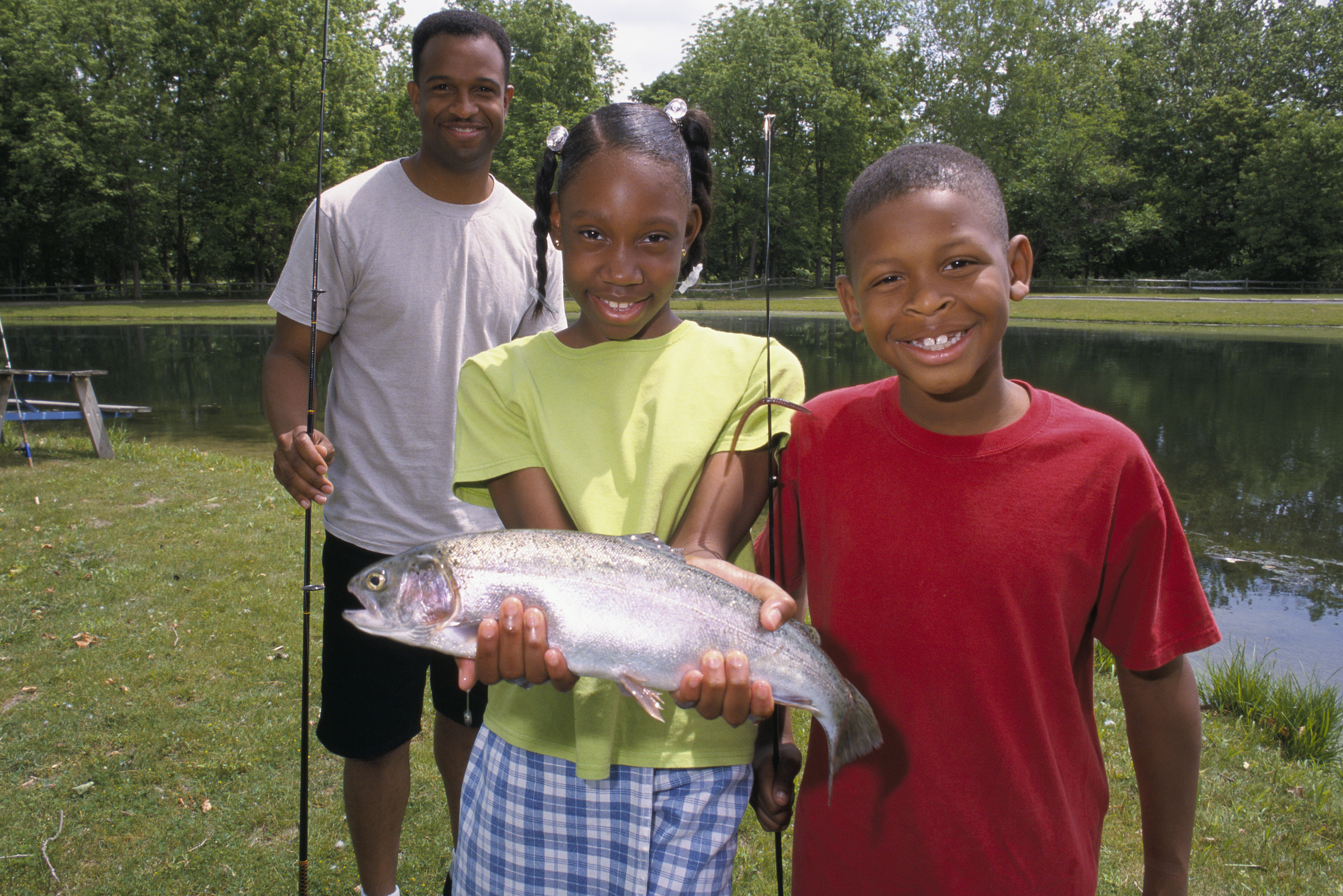
A father and his children showing a fish they caught at a local pond

In the United States today, there are nearly 13.6 million single parents raising over 21 million children. Single fathers are far less common than single mothers, constituting 16% of single-parent families. According to Single Parent Magazine, the number of single fathers has increased by 60% in the last ten years, and is one of the fastest growing family situations in the United States. 60% of single fathers are divorced, by far the most common cause of this family situation. In addition, there is an increasing trend of men having children through surrogate mothers and raising them alone. While fathers are not normally seen as primary caregivers, statistics show that 90% of single-fathers are employed, and 72% have a full-time job.

Little research has been done to suggest the hardships of the "single father as a caretaker" relationship; however, a great deal has been done on the hardships of a single-parent household. Single-parent households tend to find difficulty with the lack of help they receive. More often than not a single parent finds it difficult to find help because there is a lack of support, whether it be a second parent or other family members. This tends to put a strain on not only the parent but also the relationship between the parent and their child. Furthermore, dependency is a hardship that many parents find difficult to overcome.

As the single parent becomes closer to their child, the child grows more dependent upon that parent. This dependency, while common, may reach far past childhood, damaging the child due to their lack of independence from their parent. "Social isolation of single parents might be a stress factor that they transmit to children. Another explanation may be that the parents do not have the time needed to support and supervise their children. This can have a negative impact on the child."

Just as above, it has been found that little 'specific' research to the positives of the father as a single parent has been done; however, there are various proven pros that accompany single parenting. One proven statistic about single fathers states that a single father tends to use more positive parenting techniques than a married father. As far as non-specific pros, a strong bond tends to be formed between parent and child in single-parenting situations, allowing for an increase in maturity and closeness in the household. Gender roles are also less likely to be enforced in a single parent home because the work and chores are more likely to be shared among all individuals rather than specifically a male or female.

== Living arrangements for single parents ==
The newest census that the majority of America's 73.7 million children under age 18 live in families with two parents (69 percent), according to new statistics released from the U.S. Census Bureau. This is compared to other types of living arrangements, such as living with grandparents or having a single parent. The second most common family arrangement is children living with a single mother, at 23 percent. These statistics come from the Census Bureau's annual America's Families and Living Arrangements table package. Many single parents co-residence with their parents, more commonly single mothers do this. Studies show that in the US, single parents are more likely to live with their own parents, perhaps because of the additional financial burden of young children.

== Single parent adoption ==
Single parent adoption is legal in all 50 states, a relatively recent occurrence as California's State Department of Social Welfare was the first to permit it in the 1960s. Though, the process is arduous, and even next to impossible through some agencies. Adoption agencies have strict rules about what kinds of people they allow, and most are thorough in checking the adopter's background. An estimated 5–10% of all adoptions in the U.S. are by single persons.
