= Blackwell Family of Virginia =

African-American family from Virginia

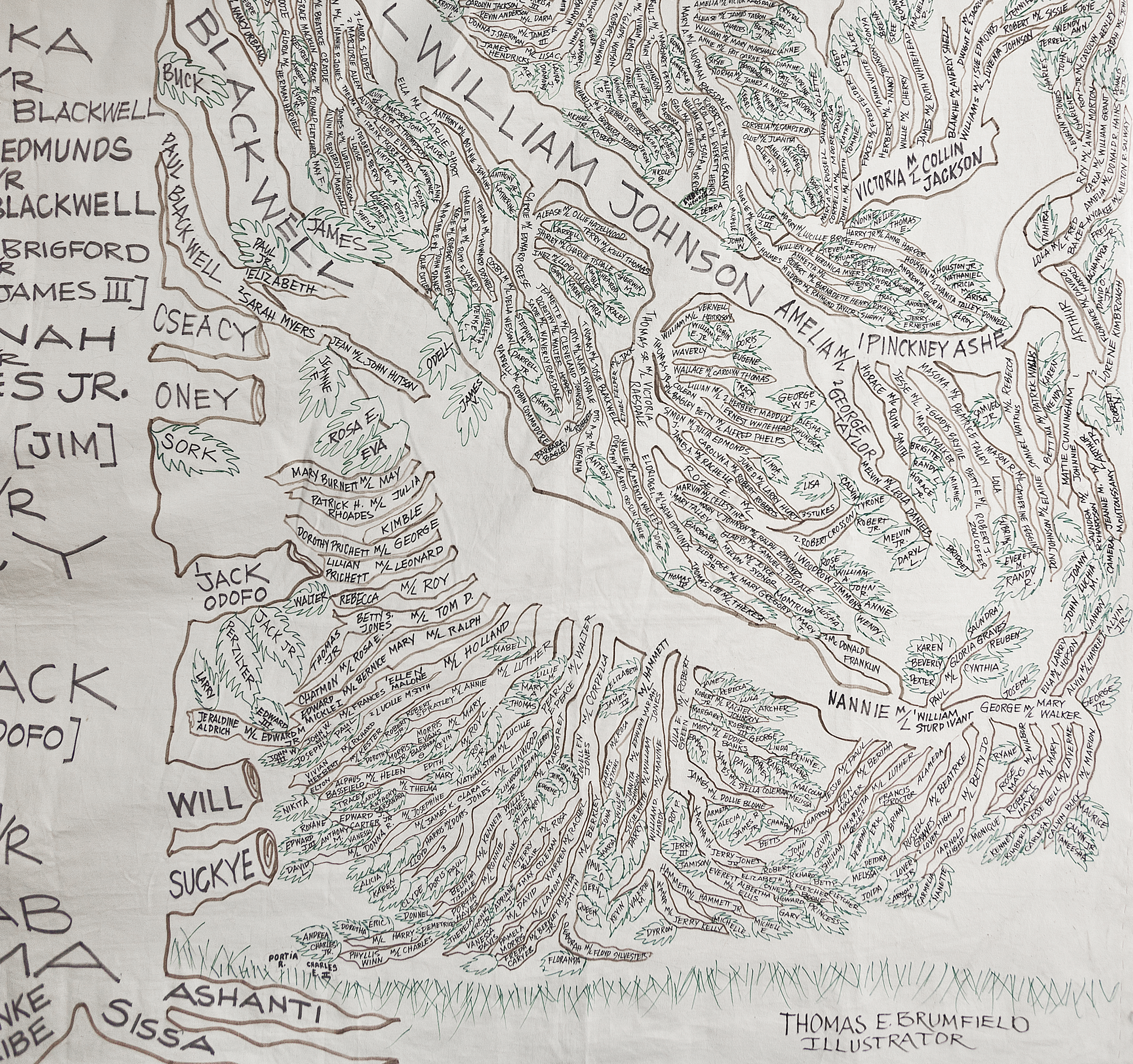
- Partial view of the Blackwell Family Tree on display
- Current region: Virginia, United States
- Founded: 1735 (earliest record)
- Website: blackwellfamilyreunion.com

The Blackwell Family of Virginia is an African-American family with documented roots dating back to the 18th century. Through genealogical research and museum exhibitions, the family’s documented history has been recognized by multiple historical institutions in Virginia and the United States.

== History ==
The Blackwell family's earliest documented ancestors trace to Ama (or Amar) and her daughter Tab, who arrived in Virginia from Africa in 1735 aboard the slave ship Doddington. Over subsequent generations, the Blackwells lived primarily in Lunenburg, Brunswick, and Nottoway counties in Virginia, working as preachers, farmers, and sharecroppers before transitioning into professional occupations during the 20th century.

The first Blackwell family reunion was held in 1953. In 1959, the first Blackwell Family Tree was unveiled, visually depicting multiple generations of family members.

== Genealogical research ==
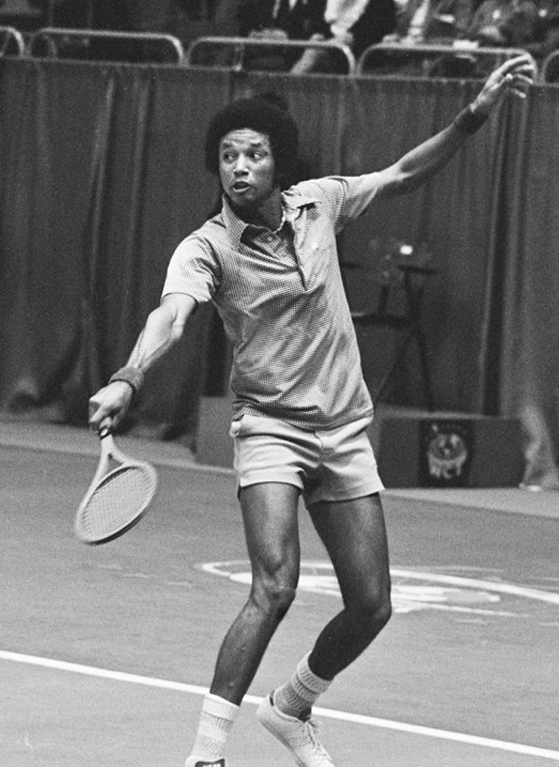
Arthur Ashe, a descendant connected to the Blackwell Family Tree

Family historian Thelma Short Doswell began documenting the family history after the first reunion in 1953. She compiled oral histories, church records, property documents, and archival materials over several decades. Her research culminated in the self-published family history book Re-United Missing Links That Bind Our Present with Our Past: A Genealogy-History Sketch of the Blackwell Kinsfolk 1735-1979.

In addition to archival records, modern genetic testing has been used to corroborate the family's African origins.

== Public exhibitions ==
Large-scale Blackwell Family Trees have been displayed in major cultural institutions. The family tree has been exhibited at the Library of Congress in Washington, D.C. A 1971 version of the family tree with 3,333 names is held by the Reginald F. Lewis Museum of Maryland African American History & Culture. The third version of the family tree was done in 1991 with 5,000 names. It is held by the Virginia Museum of History & Culture in Richmond.

The exhibits have been recognized for highlighting African-American family resilience and inter-generational continuity.

== Family reunions ==
The Blackwell Family continues to hold annual reunions, drawing descendants from across the United States. Reunion events often feature presentations of genealogical research, workshops, and viewings of the family tree exhibits.

== Legacy ==
The Blackwell family genealogy has been recognized by multiple museums and archives as one of the most extensive documented African-American family histories in the United States.
